= List of moths of Russia (Gelechioidea) =

This is a list of the Russian moth species of the superfamily Gelechioidea. It also acts as an index to the species articles and forms part of the full List of moths of Russia.

== Ethmiidae ==
- Ethmia angarensis Caradja, 1939
- Ethmia aurifluella (Hübner, 1810)
- Ethmia bipunctella (Fabricius, 1775)
- Ethmia candidella (Alphéraky, 1908)
- Ethmia chrysopyga (Zeller, 1844)
- Ethmia chrysopygella (Kolenati, 1846)
- Ethmia cirrhocnemia (Lederer, 1872)
- Ethmia comitella Caradja, 1927
- Ethmia discrepitella (Rebel, 1901)
- Ethmia dodecea (Haworth, 1828)
- Ethmia ermineella Walsingham, 1880
- Ethmia fumidella (Wocke, 1850)
- Ethmia haemorrhoidella (Eversmann, 1844)
- Ethmia maracandica (Rebel, 1901)
- Ethmia nigrimaculata Sattler, 1967
- Ethmia nigripedella Erschoff, 1877
- Ethmia pusiella (Linnaeus, 1758)
- Ethmia pyrausta (Pallas, 1771)
- Ethmia quadrillella (Goeze, 1783)
- Ethmia quadripunctella (Eversmann, 1844)
- Ethmia septempunctata (Christoph, 1882)
- Ethmia sibirica Danilevsky, 1975
- Ethmia soljanikovi Danilevsky & Zagulajev, 1975
- Ethmia turkmeniella Dubatolov & Ustjuzhanin, 1998
- Ethmia ubsensis Zagulajev, 1975
- Ethmia ultima Sattler, 1967
- Ethmia vidua (Staudinger, 1879)
- Ethmia vittalbella (Christoph, 1877)
- Ethmia xanthopleura Meyrick, 1931
- Ethmia zaguljaevi Kostjuk, 1980

== Depressariidae ==
- Agonopterix abditella Hannemann, 1959
- Agonopterix abjectella (Christoph, 1882)
- Agonopterix adspersella (Kollar, 1832)
- Agonopterix agyrella (Rebel, 1917)
- Agonopterix alstromeriana (Clerck, 1759)
- Agonopterix angelicella (Hübner, [1813])
- Agonopterix anticella (Erschoff, 1877)
- Agonopterix archangelicella (Caradja, 1920)
- Agonopterix arctica (Strand, 1902)
- Agonopterix arenella ([Denis & Schiffermüller], 1775)
- Agonopterix assimilella (Treitschke, 1832)
- Agonopterix astrantiae (Heinemann, 1870)
- Agonopterix atomella ([Denis & Schiffermüller], 1775)
- Agonopterix bipunctifera (Matsumura, 1931)
- Agonopterix broennoeensis (Strand, 1920)
- Agonopterix capreolella (Zeller, 1839)
- Agonopterix carduella (Hübner, [1817])
- Agonopterix caucasiella Karsholt, Lvovsky & Nielsen, 2006
- Agonopterix ciliella (Stainton, 1849)
- Agonopterix cnicella (Treitschke, 1832)
- Agonopterix conterminella (Zeller, 1839)
- Agonopterix costaemaculella (Christoph, 1882)
- Agonopterix curvipunctosa (Haworth, 1811)
- Agonopterix divergella (Caradja, 1920)
- Agonopterix doronicella (Wocke, 1849)
- Agonopterix dubatolovi Lvovsky, 1995
- Agonopterix encentra (Meyrick, 1914)
- Agonopterix erythrella (Snellen, 1884)
- Agonopterix exquisitella (Caradja, 1920)
- Agonopterix ferocella (Chrétien, 1910)
- Agonopterix furvella (Treitschke, 1832)
- Agonopterix galbella Hannemann, 1959
- Agonopterix heracliana (Linnaeus, 1758)
- Agonopterix hypericella (Hübner, [1817])
- Agonopterix intersecta (Filipjev, 1929)
- Agonopterix irrorata (Staudinger, 1870)
- Agonopterix kaekeritziana (Linnaeus, 1767)
- Agonopterix kuznetzovi Lvovsky, 1983
- Agonopterix lacteella (Caradja, 1920)
- Agonopterix laterella ([Denis & Schiffermüller], 1775)
- Agonopterix liturosa (Haworth, 1811)
- Agonopterix l-nigrum (Matsumura, 1931)
- Agonopterix melancholica (Rebel, 1917)
- Agonopterix multiplicella (Erschoff, 1877)
- Agonopterix mutuurai Saito, 1980
- Agonopterix nervosa (Haworth, 1811)
- Agonopterix ocellana (Fabricius, 1775)
- Agonopterix ochrocephala Saito, 1980
- Agonopterix omelkoi Lvovsky, 1985
- Agonopterix ordubadensis Hannemann, 1959
- Agonopterix pallidior (Stringer, 1930)
- Agonopterix pallorella (Zeller, 1839)
- Agonopterix parilella (Treitschke, 1835)
- Agonopterix probella Hannemann, 1953
- Agonopterix propinquella (Treitschke, 1835)
- Agonopterix purpurea (Haworth, 1811)
- Agonopterix quadripunctata (Wocke, 1858)
- Agonopterix rimantasi Lvovsky, 1985
- Agonopterix rimulella (Caradja, 1920)
- Agonopterix rubrovittella (Caradja, 1926)
- Agonopterix rutana (Fabricius, 1794)
- Agonopterix sapporensis (Matsumura, 1931)
- Agonopterix senecionis (Nickerl, 1864)
- Agonopterix septicella (Snellen, 1884)
- Agonopterix sinevi Lvovsky, 1984
- Agonopterix subpropinquella (Stainton, 1849)
- Agonopterix subtakamukui Lvovsky, 1998
- Agonopterix subumbellana Hannemann, 1959
- Agonopterix sumizome Fujisawa, 1985
- Agonopterix sutschanella (Caradja, 1926)
- Agonopterix takamukui (Matsumura, 1931)
- Agonopterix tarkiella Lvovsky, 2001
- Agonopterix tolli Hannemann, 1959
- Agonopterix yeatiana (Fabricius, 1781)
- Agonopterix yomogiella Saito, 1980
- Depressaria absynthiella Herrich-Schäffer, 1865
- Depressaria albipunctella ([Denis & Schiffermüller, 1775)
- Depressaria altaica Zeller, 1854
- Depressaria artemisiae Nickerl, 1864
- Depressaria atrostrigella Clarke, 1941
- Depressaria badiella (Hübner, 1796)
- Depressaria cervicella Herrich-Schäffer, 1854
- Depressaria chaerophylli Zeller, 1839
- Depressaria colossella Caradja, 1920
- Depressaria depressana (Fabricius, 1775)
- Depressaria dictamnella (Treitschke, 1835)
- Depressaria discipunctella Herrich-Schäffer, 1854
- Depressaria djakonovi Lvovsky, 1981
- Depressaria douglasella Stainton, 1849
- Depressaria emeritella Stainton, 1849
- Depressaria falkovitshi Lvovsky, 1990
- Depressaria filipjevi Lvovsky, 1981
- Depressaria fuscovirgatella Hannemann, 1967
- Depressaria golovushkini Lvovsky, 1995
- Depressaria hannemanniana Lvovsky, 1990
- Depressaria hofmanni Stainton, 1861
- Depressaria hystricella Moschler, 1860
- Depressaria indecorella Rebel, 1917
- Depressaria irregularis Matsumura, 1931
- Depressaria kostjuki Lvovsky, 1998
- Depressaria leucocephala Snellen, 1884
- Depressaria libanotidella Sch lager, 1849
- Depressaria marcella Rebel, 1901
- Depressaria olerella Zeller, 1854
- Depressaria pimpinellae Zeller, 1839
- Depressaria pulcherrimella Stainton, 1849
- Depressaria radiella (Goeze, 1783)
- Depressaria rubricella ([Denis & Schiffermüller], 1775)
- Depressaria sibirella Lvovsky, 1981
- Depressaria silesiaca Heinemann, 1870
- Depressaria sordidatella Tengstrom, 1848
- Depressaria subalbipunctella Lvovsky, 1981
- Depressaria taciturna Meyrick, 1910
- Depressaria ultimella Stainton, 1849
- Eutorna leonidi Lvovsky, 1979
- Exaeretia allisella Stainton, 1849
- Exaeretia amurella Lvovsky, 1990
- Exaeretia boreella Lvovsky, 1990
- Exaeretia ciniflonella (Lienig & Zeller, 1846)
- Exaeretia culcitella (Herrich-Schäffer, 1854)
- Exaeretia daurella Lvovsky, 1998
- Exaeretia fuscogriseella Hannemann, 1990
- Exaeretia indubitatella (Hannemann, 1971)
- Exaeretia lechriosema (Meyrick, 1928)
- Exaeretia lepidella (Christoph, 1872)
- Exaeretia mongolicella (Christoph, 1882)
- Exaeretia niviferella (Christoph, 1872)
- Exaeretia praeustella (Rebel, 1917)
- Exaeretia sutschanensis (Hannemann, 1953)
- Exaeretia ussuriella (Caradja, 1920)
- Lamprystica igneola Stringer, 1930
- Levipalpus hepatariella (Lienig & Zeller, 1846)
- Luquetia lobella ([Denis & Schiffermüller], 1775)
- Luquetia orientella (Rebel, 1893)
- Orophia denisella ([Denis & Schiffermüller], 1775)
- Orophia ferrugella ([Denis & Schiffermüller], 1775)
- Orophia sordidella (Hübner, 1796)
- Semioscopis avellanella (Hübner, 1793)
- Semioscopis japonicella Saito, 1989
- Semioscopis oculella (Thunberg, 1794)
- Semioscopis similis Saito, 1989
- Semioscopis steinkellneriana ([Denis & Schiffermüller], 1775)
- Semioscopis strigulana ([Denis & Schiffermüller], 1775)

== Peleopodidae ==
- Acria emarginella (Donovan, 1806)
- Letogenes festalis Meyrick, 1930

== Elachistidae ==
- Atrinia olgae Sinev, 1992
- Biselachista abiskoella (Bengtsson, 1977)
- Biselachista albidella (Nylander, 1848)
- Biselachista bipunctella Sinev & Sruoga, 1995
- Biselachista cinereopunctella (Haworth, 1828)
- Biselachista contaminatella (Zeller, 1847)
- Biselachista devexella (Kaila, 2003)
- Biselachista eleochariella (Stainton, 1851)
- Biselachista juliensis (Frey, 1870)
- Biselachista kebneella Traugott-Olsen & Nielsen, 1977
- Biselachista pusillella Sinev & Sruoga, 1995
- Biselachista scirpi (Stainton, 1887)
- Biselachista serricornis (Stainton, 1854)
- Biselachista tersella Sinev & Sruoga, 1995
- Biselachista trapeziella (Stainton, 1849)
- Biselachista utonella (Frey, 1856)
- Cosmiotes bifurcatella Sinev & Sruoga, 1995
- Cosmiotes cornutifera Sruoga, 1995
- Cosmiotes exactella (Herrich-Schäffer, 1855)
- Cosmiotes freyerella (Hübner, 11825])
- Cosmiotes pravella Sinev & Sruoga, 1995
- Cosmiotes stabilella (Stainton, 1858)
- Dibrachia kalki (Parenti, 1978)
- Elachista acutella Kaila, 2003
- Elachista adelpha Kaila & Jalava, 1994
- Elachista adscitella Stainton, 1851
- Elachista albifrontella (Hübner, [1817])
- Elachista alpinella Stainton, 1854
- Elachista anitella Traugott-Olsen, 1985
- Elachista anserinella Zeller, 1839
- Elachista apicipunctella Stainton, 1849
- Elachista arduella Kaila, 2003
- Elachista argentella (Clerck, 1759)
- Elachista atricomella Stainton, 1849
- Elachista baikalica Kaila, 1992
- Elachista bedellella (Sircom, 1848)
- Elachista biatomella (Stainton, 1848)
- Elachista bifasciella Treitschke, 1833
- Elachista bimaculata Parenti, 1981
- Elachista bisetella Sinev & Sruoga, 1995
- Elachista bisulcella (Duponchel, 1843)
- Elachista caliginosa Parenti, 1983
- Elachista canapennella (Hübner, [1813])
- Elachista canis Parenti, 1983
- Elachista chamaea Kaila, 2003
- Elachista chrysodesmella Zeller, 1850
- Elachista cingillella (Herrich-Schäffer, 1855)
- Elachista coloratella Sinev & Sruoga, 1995
- Elachista constitella Frey, 1859
- Elachista diederichsiella Hering, 1889
- Elachista dispilella Zeller, 1839
- Elachista dispunctella (Duponchel, 1843)
- Elachista dubitella Sinev & Sruoga, 1995
- Elachista elegans Frey, 1859
- Elachista ermolenkoi Sinev & Sruoga, 1995
- Elachista falaxella Sinev & Sruoga, 1995
- Elachista fasciola Parenti, 1983
- Elachista flavescens Parenti, 1981
- Elachista fumosella Sinev & Sruoga, 1995
- Elachista fuscofrontella Sruoga, 1990
- Elachista galactitella (Evcrsmann, 1844)
- Elachista gangabella Zeller, 1850
- Elachista gibbera Kaila, 2003
- Elachista gleichenella (Fabricius, 1781)
- Elachista gormella Nielsen & Traugott-Olsen, 1987
- Elachista griseella (Duponchel, 1842)
- Elachista habeleri Traugott-Olsen, 1990
- Elachista hedemanni Rebel, 1899
- Elachista heringi Rebel, 1899
- Elachista herrichii Frey, 1859
- Elachista humilis Zeller, 1850
- Elachista jaskai Kaila, 1998
- Elachista kilmunella Stainton, 1849
- Elachista lambeseella Nielsen & Traugott-Olsen, 1987
- Elachista latebrella Sinev & Sruoga, 1995
- Elachista leifi Kaila & Kerppola, 1992
- Elachista littoricola Le Marchand, 1938
- Elachista lugdunensis Frey, 1859
- Elachista luticomella Zeller, 1839
- Elachista maculicerusella Bruand, 1859
- Elachista manni Traugott-Olsen, 1990
- Elachista martinii Hofmann, 1898
- Elachista megagnathos Sruoga, 1990
- Elachista microdigitata Parenti, 1983
- Elachista multidentella Sinev &, Sruoga, 1995
- Elachista nielswolffi Svensson, 1976
- Elachista nigrothoracella Sinev & Sruoga, 1995
- Elachista nitensella Sinev & Sruoga, 1995
- Elachista nitidulella (Herrich-Schäffer, 1855)
- Elachista nobilella Zeller, 1839
- Elachista nolckeni Sulcs, 1992
- Elachista obliquella Stainton, 1854
- Elachista olschwangi Kaila, 2003
- Elachista opacella Sinev & Sruoga, 1995
- Elachista optatella Sinev & Sruoga, 1995
- Elachista orientella Sinev & Sruoga, 1995
- Elachista ornithopodella Frey, 1859
- Elachista orstadii Palm, 1943
- Elachista parasella Traugott-Olsen, 1974
- Elachista pigerella (Herrich-Schäffer, 1854)
- Elachista planicara Kaila, 1998
- Elachista poae Stainton, 1855
- Elachista pollinariella Zeller, 1839
- Elachista pollutella Duponchel, 1843
- Elachista pomerana Frey, 1870
- Elachista pullicomella Zeller, 1839
- Elachista quadripunctella (Hübner, [1825])
- Elachista regificella Sircom, 1849
- Elachista revinctella Zeller, 1850
- Elachista ripula Kaila, 1998
- Elachista rudectella Stainton, 1851
- Elachista rufella Sinev & Sruoga, 1995
- Elachista sagittiferella Sinev & Sruoga, 1995
- Elachista sasae Sinev & Sruoga, 1995
- Elachista simplimorphella Sinev & Sruoga, 1995
- Elachista spumella Caradja, 1920
- Elachista squamosella (Duponchel, 1843)
- Elachista subalbidella Schlager, 1847
- Elachista subnigrella Douglas, 1853
- Elachista subocellea (Stephens, 1834)
- Elachista szocsi Parenti, 1978
- Elachista tetragonella (Herrich-Schäffer, 1855)
- Elachista tinctella Sinev & Sruoga, 1995
- Elachista unifasciella (Haworth, 1828)
- Elachista vonschantzi Svensson, 1976
- Elachista zernyi Hartig, 1941
- Hemiprosopa altaica Sinev, 1998
- Hemiprosopa dasycara Kaila, 1998
- Mendesia farinella (Thunberg, 1794)
- Perittia andoi Kuroko, 1982
- Perittia herrichiella (Herrich-Schäffer, 1855)
- Perittia sibirica Sinev, 1992
- Perittia unicolorella Sinev, 1992
- Perittia unifasciella Sinev, 1992
- Perittoides ochrella Sinev, 1992
- Stephensia abbreviatella (Stainton, 1851)
- Stephensia jalmarella Kaila, 1992
- Stephensia ussuriella Sinev, 1992

== Agonoxenidae ==
- Blastodacna atra (Hawotth, 1828)
- Blastodacna hellerella (Duponchel, 1838)
- Blastodacna mandshurica Sinev, 1986
- Chrysoclista lathmella T. B. Fletcher, 1936
- Chrysoclista linneela (Clerck, 1759)
- Dystebenna stephensi (Stainton, 1849)
- Haplochrois coleophorella (Sinev, 1993)
- Haplochrois kuznetzovi (Sinev, 1986)
- Haplochrois monomorpha (Sinev, 1986)
- Haplochrois ochrella (Sinev, 1986)
- Haplochrois orientella (Sinev, 1979)
- Haplochrois theae (Kusnezov, 1916)
- Heinemannia festivella ([Denis & Schiffermüller], 1775)
- Heinemannia laspeyrella (Hübner, 1796)
- Microcolona aurantiella Sinev, 1988
- Spuleria auriscapella Sinev, 1988
- Spuleria flavicaput (Haworth, 1828)
- Spuleria fulvifrontella Sinev, 1986
- Trachydora ussuriella Sinev, 1981

== Scythrididae ==
- Eretmocera medinella (Staudinger, 1859)
- Parascythris muelleri (Mann, 1871)
- Scythris acipenserella Nupponen & Nupponen, 2000
- Scythris aegrella Nupponen & Junnilainen, 2000
- Scythris albisaxella Nupponen & Nupponen, 2000
- Scythris albosuffusella Nupponen, 2007
- Scythris ammobia Falkovitsh, 1972
- Scythris amphonycella ([Geyer], 1836)
- Scythris anomaloptera (Staudinger, 1880)
- Scythris apotomella Nupponen, 2007
- Scythris arenicola Nupponen, 2005
- Scythris arkaimensis Bengtsson, 2000
- Scythris bagdadiella Amse1, 1949
- Scythris barguzinensis Bengtsson & Liska, 1996
- Scythris bengtssoni Patocka & Liska, 1989
- Scythris bifissella (Hofmann, 1889)
- Scythris braschiella (Hofmann, 1898)
- Scythris brunneofasciella Nupponen & Junnilainen, 2000
- Scythris buraetica Nupponen, 2007
- Scythris cassiterella (Snellen, 1884)
- Scythris cervella Nupponen & Nupponen, 2001
- Scythris clavella (Zeller, 1855)
- Scythris complexa Sinev, 2001
- Scythris cretacella Nupponen & Nupponen, 2000
- Scythris cuspidella ([Denis & Sch1ffermuller], 1775)
- Scythris dahurica Sinev, 2001
- Scythris disparella (Tengstrom, 1848)
- Scythris eevae Nupponen, 2007
- Scythris elenae Nupponen, 2000
- Scythris emichi (Anker, 1870)
- Scythris ericetella (Heinemann, 1872)
- Scythris erinacella Nupponen, 2003
- Scythris eversmanni Nupponen & Nupponen, 2000
- Scythris fallacella (Sch1ager, 1847)
- Scythris felixi Bengtsson & Sutter, 1996
- Scythris fissurella Bengtsson, 1996
- Scythris flavilaterella (Fuchs, 1886)
- Scythris flaviventrella (Herrich-Schäffer, 1855)
- Scythris fuscoaurella Bengtsson & Liska, 1996
- Scythris fuscopterella Bengtsson, 1977
- Scythris gorbunovi Nupponen, 2003
- Scythris gozmanyi Passerin d'Entreves, 1986
- Scythris grandipennis (Haworth, 1828)
- Scythris gravatella (Ze11er, 1847)
- Scythris hamardabanica Nupponen, 2003
- Scythris hamatella Nupponen & T.Nupponen, 2001
- Scythris heikkii Nupponen, 2007
- Scythris hemicycliella Nupponen, 2005
- Scythris immaculatella (Chambers, 1875)
- Scythris inconspicuella Sinev, 2001
- Scythris inertella (Zeller, 1855)
- Scythris inspersella (Hübner, [1817])
- Scythris jakutica Sinev, 2001
- Scythris jalavai Sinev, 1993
- Scythris kasyi Hannemann, 1962
- Scythris knochella (Fabricius, 1794)
- Scythris kullbergi Bengtsson, 1997
- Scythris kyzylensis Bengtsson, 1997
- Scythris laminella ([Denis & Schiffermüller], 1775)
- Scythris lativalvella Sinev, 2001
- Scythris limbella (Fabricius, 1775)
- Scythris luxatiella Nupponen & Kaitila, 2000
- Scythris lvovskyi Sinev, 2001
- Scythris macrourella Sinev, 2001
- Scythris maculata Sinev, 2001
- Scythris malozemovi Nupponen, 2003
- Scythris maritimella Sinev, 2001
- Scythris mikkolai Sinev, 1993
- Scythris minorella Sinev, 2001
- Scythris nigridorsella Nupponen, 2007
- Scythris ninae Nupponen, 2003
- Scythris nitidella Bengtsson & Liska, 1996
- Scythris noricella (Zeller, 1843)
- Scythris obscurella (Scopoli, 1763)
- Scythris olschwangi Nupponen & Nupponen, 2000
- Scythris omelkoi Sinev, 2001
- Scythris orientella Sinev, 2001
- Scythris palustris (Zeller, 1855)
- Scythris pascuella (Zeller, 1855)
- Scythris paullella (Herrich-Schäffer, 1855)
- Scythris penicillata Chrétien, 1900
- Scythris perlucidella Nupponen & Nupponen, 2000
- Scythris picaepennis (Haworth, 1828)
- Scythris potatorella Nupponen, 2003
- Scythris productella (Zeller, 1839)
- Scythris pudorinella (Moschler, 1866)
- Scythris remexella Nupponen & Kaitila, 2000
- Scythris satyrella Staudinger, 1880
- Scythris seliniella (Zeller, 1839)
- Scythris setiella (Zeller, 1870)
- Scythris sibirella Sinev, 2001
- Scythris sinensis (R.Felder & Rogenhofer, 1875)
- Scythris sinnevi Nupponen, 2003
- Scythris spinella Nupponen & Nupponen, 2001
- Scythris subaerariella (Stainton, 1867)
- Scythris subcassiterella Bengtsson, 1997
- Scythris sublaminella Nupponen & Nupponen, 2000
- Scythris terekholensis Bengtsson, 1997
- Scythris tributella (Zeller, 1847)
- Scythris tumidella Nupponen &, Nupponen, 2001
- Scythris ustjuzhanini Sachkov & Sinev, 2001

== Xyloryctidae ==
- Epichostis abrupta (Omelko, 1995)
- Pantelamprus staudingeri Christoph, 1882

== Chimabachidae ==
- Dasystoma kurentzovi (Lvovsky, 1990)
- Dasystoma salicella (Hübner, 1796)
- Diurnea fagella (Denis & Schiffermüller, 1775)
- Diurnea lipsiella (Denis & Schiffermüller, 1775)
- Diurnea soljanikovi Lvovsky, 1986

== Oecophoridae ==
- Aplota palpella (Haworth, 1828)
- Bisigna procerella ([Denis & Schiffermüller], 1775)
- Borkhausenia fuscescens (Haworth, 1828)
- Borkhausenia luridicomella (Herrich-Schäffer, 1856)
- Borkhausenia minutella (Linnaeus, 1758)
- Buvatina iremella Junnilainen & Nupponen, 1999
- Callimodes heringii (Lederer, 1864)
- Callimodes zelleri (Christoph, 1882)
- Carcina luridella (Christoph, 1882)
- Carcina quercana (Fabricius, 1775)
- Crassa tinctella (Hübner, 1796)
- Crassa unitella (Hübner, 1796)
- Dasycera oliviella (Fabricius, 1794)
- Decantha borkhausenii (Zeller, 1839)
- Denisia augustella (Hübner, 1796)
- Denisia coeruleopicta (Christoph, 1888)
- Denisia luticiliella (Erschoff, 1877)
- Denisia obscurella (Brandt, 1937)
- Denisia similella (Hübner, 1796)
- Denisia stipella (Linnaeus, 1758)
- Denisia stroemella (Fabricius, 1779)
- Deuterogonia chionoxantha (Meyrick, 1931)
- Deuterogonia pudorina (Wocke, 1857)
- Endrosis sarcitrella (Linnaeus, 1758)
- Epicallima conchylidella (Snellen, 1884)
- Epicallima formosella ([Denis & Schiffermüller], 1775)
- Epicallima gerasimovi (Lvovsky, 1984)
- Epicallima nadezhdae (Lvovsky, 1985)
- Epicallima subsuzukiella (Lvovsky, 1985)
- Fabiola pokornyi (Nickerl, 1864)
- Harpella forticella (Scopoli, 1763)
- Hofmannophila pseudospretella (Stainton, 1849)
- Holoscolia huebneri Kodak, 1980
- Martyringa ussuriella Lvovsky, 1979
- Martyringa xeraula (Meyrick, 1910)
- Metalampra caucasica Lvovsky, [1994]
- Metalampra cinnamomea (Zeller, 1839)
- Minetia crinitus (Fabricius, 1798)
- Oecophora bractella (Linnaeus, 1758)
- Pleurota aorsella Christoph, 1872
- Pleurota aristella (Linnaeus, 1767)
- Pleurota bicostella (Clerck, 1759)
- Pleurota contignatella Christoph, 1872
- Pleurota cumaniella Rebel, 1907
- Pleurota kostjuki Lvovsky, 1990
- Pleurota malatya Back, 1973
- Pleurota monotonia Filipjev, 1924
- Pleurota neurograpta Filipjev, 1929
- Pleurota pungitiella Herrich-Schäffer, 1854
- Pleurota pyropella (Denis & Schiffermüller, 1775)
- Pleurota sibirica Rebel, 1901
- Pleurota tuvella Lvovsky, 1992
- Promalactis ermolenkoi Lvovsky, 1986
- Promalactis jezonica (Matsumura, 1931)
- Promalactis parki Lvovsky, 1986
- Promalactis sinevi Lvovsky, 1986
- Promalactis svetlanae Lvovsky, 1985
- Promalactis venustella (Christoph, 1882)
- Pseudocryptolechia sareptensis (Moschler, 1862)
- Schiffermuelleria schaefferella (Linnaeus, 1758)

== Lecithoceridae ==
- Lecithocera chersitis Meyrick, 1918
- Lecithocera nigrana (Duponchel, 1836)
- Odites kollarella (Costa, 1832)
- Odites notocapna Meyrick, 1925
- Rhizosthenes falciformis Meyrick, 1935
- Scythropiodes choricopa (Meyrick, 1931)
- Scythropiodes issikii (Takahashi, 1930)
- Scythropiodes ussuriella Lvovsky, 1996
- Scythropiodes xenophaea (Meyrick, 1931)

== Stathmopodidae ==
- Atkinsonia swetlanae Sinev, 1988
- Atrijuglans hetaohei Yang, 1977
- Calicotis griseella Sinev, 1988
- Calicotis luteella Sinev, 1988
- Cuprina flaviscapella Sinev, 1988
- Cuprina fuscella Sinev, 1988
- Hieromantis kurokoi Yasuda, 1988
- Stathmopoda flavescens Kuznetzov, 1984
- Stathmopoda hexatyla Meyrick, 1907
- Stathmopoda opticaspis Meyrick, 1931
- Stathmopoda pedella (Linnaeus, 1761)
- Thylacosceloides miniata Sinev, 1988

== Batrachedridae ==
- Batrachedra albicapitella Sinev, 1986
- Batrachedra arenosella Walker, 1864
- Batrachedra auricomella Sinev, 1993
- Batrachedra chasanella Sinev, 1993
- Batrachedra ochricomella Sinev, 1993
- Batrachedra pinicolella (Zeller, 1839)
- Batrachedra praeangusta (Haworth, 1828)

== Coleophoridae ==
- Agapalsa idaeella (Hofmann, 1869)
- Agapalsa lusciniaepennella (Treitschke, 1833)
- Agapalsa vacciniella (Herrich-Schäffer, 1861)
- Amselghia alhagii (Falkovitsh, 1972)
- Amselghia argyrella (Herrich-Schäffer, 1856)
- Amselghia azishtella Anikin, 1998
- Amselghia balkara Falkovitsh & Jalava, 1997
- Amselghia felixella (Baldizzone, 1994)
- Amselghia fringillella (Zeller, 1839)
- Amselghia rectilineella (Fischer von Röslerstamm, [1843])
- Amselghia subnivea (Fi1ipjev, 1925)
- Amseliphora niveicostella (Zeller, 1839)
- Apista adelpha Falkovitsh, 1979
- Apista albostraminata (Toll, 1960)
- Apista callipepla Falkovitsh, 1979
- Apista dignella (Toll, 1961)
- Apista gallipennella (Hübner, 1796)
- Apista impalella (Toll, 1961)
- Apista lacera Falkovitsh, 1993
- Apista rebeli (Gerasimov, 1930)
- Apocopta exlentii Anikin, 2005
- Aporiptura dissecta Falkovitsh, 1989
- Aporiptura eurasiatica (Baldizzone, 1989)
- Aporiptura hamata (Falkovitsh, 1972)
- Aporiptura hypoxantha Falkovitsh, 1982
- Aporiptura klimeschiella (Toll, 1952)
- Aporiptura lonchodes Falkovitsh, 1994
- Aporiptura macilenta (Falkovitsh, 1972)
- Aporiptura nigridorsella (Amsel, 1935)
- Aporiptura ochroflava (Toll, 1961)
- Aporiptura ofaistoni Anikin, 2005
- Aporiptura physophorae Falkovitsh, 1994
- Ardania albicostella (Duponchel, 1842)
- Ardania bilineatella (Zeller, 1849)
- Ardania colutella (Fabricius, 1794)
- Ardania discordella (Zeller, 1849)
- Ardania genistae (Stainton, 1857)
- Ardania onobrychiella (Zeller, 1849)
- Ardania saturatella (Stainton, 1850)
- Ardania sergiella Falkovitsh, 1979
- Ardania trifariella (Zeller, 1849)
- Ardania vulpecula (Zeller, 1849)
- Argyractinia kautzi (Rebel, 1933)
- Argyractinia necessaria (Staudinger, 1880)
- Argyractinia ochrea (Haworth, 1828)
- Ascleriducta lithargyrinella (Zeller, 1849)
- Atractula glycyrrhizae Falkovitsh, 1989
- Augasma aeratella (Zeller, 1839)
- Augasma atraphaxidellum Kuznetzov, 1957
- Bima arctostaphyli (Meder, 1933)
- Bourgogneja pennella ([Denis & Schiffermüller], 1775)
- Calcomarginia ballotella (Fischer von Röslerstamm, [1839])
- Carpochena aequalella (Christoph, 1872)
- Carpochena armeniae (Baldizzone & Patzak, 1991)
- Carpochena arta Falkovitsh, 1979
- Carpochena asperginella (Christoph, 1872)
- Carpochena atlanti Anikin, 2005
- Carpochena binotapennella (Duponchel, 1843)
- Carpochena carchara (Falkovitsh, 1972)
- Carpochena ceratoidis Falkovitsh, 1979
- Carpochena crassa Falkovitsh, 1989
- Carpochena crepidinella (Zeller, 1847)
- Carpochena diogenes (Falkovitsh, 1970)
- Carpochena echinacea (Falkovitsh, 1972)
- Carpochena lativittella (Erschoff, 1877)
- Carpochena macrura (Falkovitsh, 1972)
- Carpochena orotavensis (Rebel, 1896)
- Carpochena pellicornella (Zerny, 1930)
- Carpochena pilicornis (Rebel, 1914)
- Carpochena preisseckeri (Toll, 1942)
- Carpochena salicorniae (Heinemann & Wocke, 1876)
- Carpochena squalorella (Zeller, 1849)
- Carpochena teheranella (Baldizzone, 1994)
- Carpochena trientella (Christoph, 1872)
- Carpochena tsherkesi (Falkovitsh, 1970)
- Carpochena unipunctella (Zeller, 1849)
- Carpochena weymarni (Toll, 1942)
- Casas albella (Thunberg, 1788)
- Casas zernyi (Toll, 1944)
- Casignetella absinthii (Wocke, 1876)
- Casignetella adelogrammella (Zeller, 1849)
- Casignetella albicans (Zeller, 1849)
- Casignetella albilineella (Toll, 1960)
- Casignetella albulae (Frey, 1880)
- Casignetella amarchana (Falkovitsh, 1975)
- Casignetella amellivora (Baldizzone, 1979)
- Casignetella ammophora Falkovitsh, 1989
- Casignetella ancistron (Falkovitsh, 1976)
- Casignetella arenifera Falkovitsh, 1989
- Casignetella argentula (Stephens, 1834)
- Casignetella artemisicolella (Bruand, [1855])
- Casignetella burmanni (Toll, 1952)
- Casignetella ciconiella (Herrich-Schäffer, 1855)
- Casignetella clarissa Falkovitsh, 1977
- Casignetella corsicella (Walsingham, 1898)
- Casignetella darigangae Falkovitsh, 1976
- Casignetella dentatella (Toll & Amsel, 1967)
- Casignetella derasofasciella (Klimesch, 1952)
- Casignetella deviella (Zeller, 1847)
- Casignetella dianthi (Herrich-Schäffer, 1855)
- Casignetella diplodon Falkovitsh, 1993
- Casignetella directella (Zeller, 1849)
- Casignetella discifera (Falkovitsh, 1976)
- Casignetella eltonica Anikin, 2005
- Casignetella erratella (Toll & Amsel, 1967)
- Casignetella expressella (Klemensiewicz, 1883)
- Casignetella exul Falkovitsh, 1992
- Casignetella falkovitshella (Vives, 1984)
- Casignetella filaginella (Fuchs, 1881)
- Casignetella follicularis (Vallot, 1802)
- Casignetella galatellae (Hering, 1942)
- Casignetella galbulipennella (Zeller, 1838)
- Casignetella gardesanella (Toll, 1953)
- Casignetella genviki Anikin, 2002
- Casignetella gnaphalii (Zeller, 1839)
- Casignetella graminicolella (Heinemann, 1876)
- Casignetella granulatella (Zeller, 1849)
- Casignetella hackmani (Toll, 1953)
- Casignetella heihensis (Li & Zhang, 2000)
- Casignetella hsiaolingensis (Toll, 1942)
- Casignetella hyssopi (Toll, 1961)
- Casignetella inulae (Wocke, 1876)
- Casignetella koreana (Baldizzone, 1989)
- Casignetella kudrosella (Baldizzone & Oku, 1988)
- Casignetella kyffhusana (Petry, 1898)
- Casignetella lebedella Falkovitsh, 1982
- Casignetella linosyridella (Fuchs, 1880)
- Casignetella loxodon Falkovitsh, 1993
- Casignetella microdon Falkovitsh, 1993
- Casignetella millefolii (Zeller, 1849)
- Casignetella moronella (Falkovitsh, 1975)
- Casignetella morosa Falkovitsh, 1993
- Casignetella nanophyti (Falkovitsh, 1975)
- Casignetella napolovi (Baldizzone & Savenkov, 2002)
- Casignetella niveistrigella (Wocke, 1876)
- Casignetella nubivagella (Zeller, 1849)
- Casignetella nutantella (Muhlig & Frey, 1857)
- Casignetella occatella (Staudinger, 1880)
- Casignetella opulens Falkovitsh, 1977
- Casignetella palifera Falkovitsh, 1977
- Casignetella paripennella (Zeller, 1839)
- Casignetella parki (Baldizzone & Savenkov, 2002)
- Casignetella peisoniella (Kasy, 1965)
- Casignetella peribenanderi (Toll, 1943)
- Casignetella pilion Falkovitsh, 1992
- Casignetella pseudociconiella (Toll, 1952)
- Casignetella pseudodirectella (Toll, 1959)
- Casignetella pseudorepentis (Toll, 1960)
- Casignetella ramosella (Zeller, 1849)
- Casignetella raphidon (Baldizzone & Savenkov, 2002)
- Casignetella remizella (Baldizzone, 1983)
- Casignetella riffelensis (Rebel, 1913)
- Casignetella saponariella (Heeger, 1848)
- Casignetella saratovi Anikin, 2005
- Casignetella scabrida (Toll, 1959)
- Casignetella silenella (Herrich-Schäffer, 1855)
- Casignetella solitariella (Zeller, 1849)
- Casignetella spiralis (Falkovitsh, 1977)
- Casignetella stepposa (Falkovitsh, 1975)
- Casignetella striatipennella (Nylander, 1848)
- Casignetella strigiferella (Snellen, 1844)
- Casignetella subtremula Anikin, 2002
- Casignetella succursella (Herrich-Schäffer, 1855)
- Casignetella tamara (Baldizzone, 1994)
- Casignetella tanaceti (Muhlig, 1865)
- Casignetella tremula Falkovitsh, 1989
- Casignetella tringella (Baldizzone, 1988)
- Casignetella trochilella (Duponchel, 1843)
- Casignetella troglodytella (Duponchel, 1843)
- Casignetella yomogiella (Oku, 1974)
- Casignetella zygodon Falkovitsh, 1993
- Cepurga hemerobiella (Scopoli, 1763)
- Characia haloxyli Falkovitsh, 1972
- Chnoocera botaurella (Herrich-Schäffer, 1861)
- Chnoocera lasiocharis (Meyrick, 1931)
- Chnoocera magnatella (Toll, 1959)
- Coleophora albidella ([Denis & Schiffermiiller], 1775)
- Coleophora bernoulliella (Goeze, 1783)
- Coleophora betulella Heinemann, 1876
- Coleophora currucipennella Zeller, 1839
- Coleophora ibipennella Zeller, 1849
- Coleophora kononenkoi Baldizzone & Savenkov, 2002
- Coleophora kuehnella (Goeze, 1783)
- Coleophora melanograpta Meyrick, 1934
- Coleophora platyphyllae Oku, 1965
- Coleophora pyrrhulipennella Zeller, 1839
- Coleophora quercicola Baldizzone & Oku, 1990
- Coleophora ringoniella Oku, 1959
- Coleophora teregnathella Baldizzone & Savenkov, 2002
- Coleophora zelleriella Heinemann, 1854
- Cricotechna vitisella (Gregson, 1856)
- Damophila alcyonipennella (Kollar, 1832)
- Damophila deauratella (Lienig & Zeller, 1846)
- Damophila frischella (Linnaeus, 1758)
- Damophila mayrella (Hübner, [1813])
- Damophila pustulosa Falkovitsh, 1979
- Damophila trifolii Curtis, 1832
- Dumitrescumia cecidophorella (Oudejans, 1972)
- Dumitrescumia hydrolapathella (Hering, 1924)
- Ecebalia adspersella (Benander, 1939)
- Ecebalia anabaseos (Falkovitsh, 1975)
- Ecebalia apythana (Falkovitsh, 1989)
- Ecebalia asteris (Muhlig, 1864)
- Ecebalia atriplicis (Meyrick, 1928)
- Ecebalia attalicella (Zeller, 1871)
- Ecebalia bagorella (Falkovitsh, 1977)
- Ecebalia bajkalella (Falkovitsh, 1993)
- Ecebalia boreella (Benander, 1939)
- Ecebalia charadriella (Baldizzone, 1986)
- Ecebalia chenopodii (Oku, 1965)
- Ecebalia chumanensis Anikin, 2005
- Ecebalia cinclella (Baldizzone & Oku, 1990)
- Ecebalia cristata (Baldizzone, 1989)
- Ecebalia eichleri (Patzak, 1977)
- Ecebalia enkomiella (Baldizzone & Oku, 1988)
- Ecebalia gaviaepennella (Toll, 1952)
- Ecebalia halocnemi (Falkovitsh, 1994)
- Ecebalia halophilella (Zimmermann, 1926)
- Ecebalia halostachydis (Falkovitsh, 1994)
- Ecebalia helgada Anikin, 2005
- Ecebalia hungariae (Gozmány, 1955)
- Ecebalia immersa (Falkovitsh, 1989)
- Ecebalia irinae (Baldizzone & Savenkov, 2002)
- Ecebalia kamchatica (Anikin, 1999)
- Ecebalia kargani (Falkovhtsh, 1989)
- Ecebalia kolymella (Falkovitsh, 1992)
- Ecebalia koshmella (Falkovitsh, 1989)
- Ecebalia lassella (Staudinger, 1859)
- Ecebalia linosyris (Hering, 1937)
- Ecebalia lunensis (Falkovitsh, 1975)
- Ecebalia magyarica (Baldizzone, 1983)
- Ecebalia markisaakovitshi Budashkin, 1998
- Ecebalia monoceros (Falkovitsh, 1975)
- Ecebalia motacillella (Zeller, 1849)
- Ecebalia nomgona (Falkovitsh, 1975)
- Ecebalia obscenella (Herrich-Schäffer, 1855)
- Ecebalia pandionella (Baldizzone, 1988)
- Ecebalia pappiferella (Hofmann, 1869)
- Ecebalia parasymi Anikin, 2005
- Ecebalia pinii Anikin, 2005
- Ecebalia pratella (Zeller, 1871)
- Ecebalia pseudolinosyris (Kasy, 1979)
- Ecebalia pseudosquamosella (Baldizzone & Nel, 2003)
- Ecebalia punctulatella (Zeller, 1849)
- Ecebalia quadrifariella (Staudinger, 1880)
- Ecebalia saxicolella (Duponchel, 1843)
- Ecebalia sittella (Baldizzone, 1989)
- Ecebalia squamosella (Stainton, 1856)
- Ecebalia sternipennella (Zetterstedt, 1839)
- Ecebalia subula Falkovitsh, 1993
- Ecebalia superlonga (Falkovitsh, 1989)
- Ecebalia symmicta (Falkovitsh, 1982)
- Ecebalia tecta (Falkovitsh, 1989)
- Ecebalia therinella (Tengstrom, 1848)
- Ecebalia tornata (Falkovitsh, 1989)
- Ecebalia tyrrhaenica (Amsel, 1951)
- Ecebalia uniphalli Anikin, 2005
- Ecebalia versurella (Zeller, 1849)
- Ecebalia vestianella (Linnaeus, 1758)
- Ecebalia virgaureae (Stainton, 1857)
- Eupista caucasica (Stainton, 1867)
- Eupista lixella (Zeller, 1849)
- Eupista malatiella (Toll, 1962)
- Eupista ornatipennella (Hübner, 1796)
- Eupista samarensis Anikin, 2001
- Frederickoenigia flavipennella (Duponchel, 1843)
- Globulia cornutella (Herrich-Schäffer, 1861)
- Goniodoma auroguttella (Fischer von Röslerstamm, [1841])
- Goniodoma limoniella (Stainton, 1884)
- Haploptilia coracipennella (Hübner, 1796)
- Haploptilia drymophila Falkovitsh, 1991
- Haploptilia katunella Falkovitsh, 1991
- Haploptilia kroneella (Fuchs, 1899)
- Haploptilia nairica Falkovitsh, 1991
- Haploptilia neviusiella (Busck, 1904)
- Haploptilia prunifoliae (Doets, 1944)
- Haploptilia serratella (Linnaeus, 1761)
- Haploptilia spinella (Schrank, 1802)
- Helophorea ledi (Stainton, 1860)
- Helophorea plumbella (Kanerva, 1941)
- Helophorea thulea (Johansson, 1967)
- Helvalbia lineolea (Haworth, 1828)
- Ionescumia acerosa Falkovitsh, 1989
- Ionescumia clypeiferella (Hofmann, 1871)
- Ionescumia dilabens Falkovitsh, 1982
- Ionescumia isomoera Falkovitsh, 1982
- Ionescumia subgilva Falkovitsh, 1991
- Ischnophanes monocentra Meyrick, 1891
- Kasyfia binderella (Kollar, 1832)
- Kasyfia obscuripalpella (Kanerva, 1941)
- Kasyfia orbitella (Zeller, 1849)
- Kasyfia unigenella (Svensson, 1966)
- Klimeschja hospitiella (Chrétien, 1915)
- Klimeschja oriolella (Zeller, 1849)
- Klimeschja rudella (Toll, 1944)
- Klimeschja tundrosa Falkovitsh, 1991
- Klimeschja vulnerariae (Zeller, 1839)
- Klinzigedia implicitella (Fuchs, 1903)
- Klinzigedia onopordiella (Zeller, 1849)
- Klinzigedia phlomidella (Christoph, 1862)
- Klinzigedia phlomidis (Stainton, 1867)
- Klinzigedia wockeella (Zeller, 1849)
- Metapista stramentella (Zeller, 1849)
- Metriotes lutarea (Haworth, 1828)
- Multicoloria astragalella (Zeller, 1849)
- Multicoloria astragalorum Falkovitsh, 1973
- Multicoloria berlandella (Toll, 1956)
- Multicoloria bulganella Reznik, 1974
- Multicoloria caelebipennella (Zel1er, 1839)
- Multicoloria caraganae (Falkovitsh, 1974)
- Multicoloria cartilaginella (Christoph, 1872)
- Multicoloria cavillosa Reznik, 1975
- Multicoloria centralis Reznik, 1975
- Multicoloria changaica Reznik, 1975
- Multicoloria conspicuella (Zeller, 1849)
- Multicoloria cracella (Vallot, 1835)
- Multicoloria ditella (Zeller, 1849)
- Multicoloria dubiella (Baker, 1888)
- Multicoloria eremosparti Falkovitsh, 1974
- Multicoloria flavicornis (Reznik, 1975)
- Multicoloria fuscociliella (Zeller, 1849)
- Multicoloria gazella (Toll, 1952)
- Multicoloria halimodendri Reznik, 1989
- Multicoloria honshuella (Baldizzone & Oku, 1988)
- Multicoloria ignobilis Reznik, 1975
- Multicoloria inconstans Reznik, 1975
- Multicoloria ortrina Reznik, 1976
- Multicoloria pallidata (Toll, 1959)
- Multicoloria paraononidella (Amsel, 1968)
- Multicoloria paraspumosella (Toll, 1957)
- Multicoloria partitella (Zeller, 1849)
- Multicoloria polonicella (Zeller, 1865)
- Multicoloria pseudoditella (Baldizzone & Patzak, 1983)
- Multicoloria remotella Reznik, 1976
- Multicoloria singreni (Falkovitsh, 1973)
- Multicoloria solenella (Staudinger, 1859)
- Multicoloria spargospinella Reznik, 1974
- Multicoloria spumosella (Staudinger, 1859)
- Multicoloria stachi (Toll, 1957)
- Multicoloria talynella Reznik, 1975
- Multicoloria tshiligella Reznik, 1976
- Multicoloria tuvensis Reznik, 1977
- Multicoloria vibicella (Hübner, [1813])
- Multicoloria vibicigerella (Zeller, 1839)
- Multicoloria vicinella (Zeller, 1849)
- Nemesia chalcogrammella (Zeller, 1839)
- Oedicaula serinipennella (Christoph, 1872)
- Orghidania gryphipennella (Hübner, 1796)
- Orthographis albipennella (Staudinger, 1880)
- Orthographis brevipalpella (Wocke, 1874)
- Orthographis chamaedriella (Bruand, 1852)
- Orthographis flavovena (Matsumura, 1931)
- Orthographis paradoxella (Toll, 1961)
- Orthographis ptarmicia (Walsingham, 1910)
- Orthographis pulmonariella (Ragonot, 1874)
- Orthographis serratulella (Herrich-Schäffer, 1855)
- Orthographis sibirica (Filipjev, 1924)
- Orthographis uralensis (Toll, 1961)
- Papyrosipha ichthyura (Falkovitsh, 1976)
- Papyrosipha zhusguni (Falkovitsh, 1972)
- Paravalvulia spiraeella (Rebel, 1916)
- Perygra adjunctella (Hodgkinson, 1882)
- Perygra alticolella (Zeller, 1849)
- Perygra antennariella (Herrich-Schäffer, 1861)
- Perygra caespititiella (Zeller, 1839)
- Perygra citrarga (Meyrick, 1934)
- Perygra elodella (Baldizzone & Oku, 1988)
- Perygra glaucicolella (Wood, 1892)
- Perygra irinella Anikin, 1999
- Perygra numeniella (Baldizzone, 1988)
- Perygra okuella (Baldizzone & Savenkov, 2002)
- Perygra otidipennella (Hübner, [1817])
- Perygra taeniipennella (Herrich-Schäffer, 1855)
- Perygra tamesis (Waters, 1929)
- Phagolamia auricella (Fabricius, 1794)
- Phagolamia chalepa Falkovitsh, 1993
- Phagolamia serpylletorum (Hering, 1889)
- Phagolamia virgatella (Zeller, 1849)
- Phylloscheme glitzella (Hofmann, 1869)
- Phylloscheme murinella (Tengstrom, 1847)
- Plegmidia juncicolella (Stainton, 1857)
- Polystrophia calligoni (Falkovitsh, 1972)
- Postvinculia lutipennella (Zeller, 1838)
- Protocryptis laricella (Hübner, [1817])
- Protocryptis maturella (Pleshanov, 1982)
- Protocryptis obducta Meyrick, 1931
- Protocryptis sibiricella (Falkovitsh, 1965)
- Quadratia fuscocuprella (Herrich-Schäffer, 1855)
- Razowskia coronillae (Zeller, 1849)
- Razowskia flaviella (Mann, 1857)
- Rhamnia ahenella (Heinemann, 1876)
- Scleriductia ochripennella (Zeller, 1849)
- Sorbicola trigeminella (Fuchs, 1881)
- Sorbicola uniformis (Oku, 1965)
- Suireia adjectella (Herrich-Schäffer, 1861)
- Suireia alnifoliae (Barasch, 1934)
- Suireia badiipennella (Duponchel, 1843)
- Suireia japonicella (Oku, 1965)
- Suireia limosipennella (Duponchel, 1843)
- Suireia milvipennis (Zeller, 1839)
- Symphypoda parthenica (Meyrick, 1891)
- Systrophoeca siccifolia (Stainton, 1856)
- Systrophoeca uliginosella (Glitz, 1872)
- Tolleophora asthenella (Constant, 1893)
- Tollsia potentillae (Elisha, 1885)
- Tollsia violacea (Strom, 1783)
- Tritemachia captiosa (Falkovitsh, 1972)
- Tritemachia teredo Falkovitsh, 1994
- Tuberculia albitarsella (Zeller, 1849)
- Valvulongia falcigerella (Christoph, 1872)
- Zagulajevia gerasimovi (Toll, 1962)
- Zagulajevia hemerobiola (Filipjev, 1926)
- Zagulajevia tadzhikiella (Danilevsky, 1955)

== Momphidae ==
- Anybia langiella (Hübner, 1796)
- Anybia nigrella Sinev, 1986
- Cyphophora idaei (Zeller, 1839)
- Cyphophora minorella Sinev, 1993
- Cyphophora polaris Sinev, 1986
- Lophoptilus miscella ([Denis & Schiffermüller], 1775)
- Mompha bradleyi Riedl, 1965
- Mompha confusella Koster & Sinev, 1996
- Mompha conturbatella (Hübner, [1819])
- Mompha divisella Herrich-Schäffer, 1854
- Mompha epilobiella ([Denis & Schiffermüller], 1775)
- Mompha glaucella Sinev, 1986
- Mompha lacteella (Stephens, 1834)
- Mompha meridionella Koster & Sinev, 2003
- Mompha ochraceella (Curtis, 1839)
- Mompha propinquella (Stainton, 1851)
- Mompha sturnipennella (Treitschke, 1833)
- Mompha subbistrigella (Haworth, 1828)
- Psacaphora locupletella ([Denis & Schiffermüller], 1775)
- Psacaphora ludwigiae Bradley, 1973
- Psacaphora raschkiella (Zeller, 1838)
- Psacaphora sexstrigella (Braun, 1921)
- Psacaphora terminella (Humphreys & Westwood, 1845)

== Blastobasidae ==
- Blastobasis centralasiae Sinev, 2007
- Blastobasis inouei Moriuti, 1987
- Blastobasis parki Sinev, 1986
- Blastobasis phycidella (Zeller, 1839)
- Blastobasis ponticella Sinev, 2007
- Blastobasis sprotundalis Park, 1984
- Hypatopa binotella (Thunberg, 1794)
- Hypatopa inunctella (Zeller, 1839)
- Hypatopa moriutiella Sinev, 1986
- Hypatopa segnella (Zeller, 1873)
- Hypatopa silvestrella Kuznetzov, 1984
- Neoblastobasis biceratala (Park, 1984)
- Neoblastobasis spiniharpella Kuznetzov & Sinev, 1985
- Pseudohypatopa beljaevi Sinev, 2007
- Tecmerium scythrella (Sinev, 1986)

== Autostichidae ==
- Apiletria murcidella (Christoph, 1877)
- Aprominta designatella (Herrich-Schäffer, 1855)
- Autosticha modicella (Christoph, 1882)
- Deroxena venosulella (Moschler, 1862)
- Donaspastus pannonicus Gozmány, 1952
- Eremicamima cedestiella (Zeller, 1868)
- Euteles flavimaculata Christoph, 1882
- Holcopogon bubulcellus (Staudinger, 1859)
- Oegoconia deauratella (Herrich-Schäffer, 1854)
- Oegoconia quadripuncta (Haworth, 1828)
- Symmoca signatella Herrich-Schäffer, 1854

== Amphisbatidae ==
- Amphisbatis incongruella (Stainton, 1849)
- Anchinia cristalis (Scopoli, 1763)
- Anchinia daphnella ([Denis & Schiffermüller], 1775)
- Anchinia grandis Stainton, 1867
- Hypercallia citrinalis (Scopoli, 1763)
- Periacma delegata Meyrick, 1914
- Pseudatemelia elsae Svensson, 1982
- Pseudatemelia flavifrontella (Denis & Schiffermüller, 1775)
- Pseudatemelia josephinae (Toll, 1956)
- Pseudatemelia kurentzovi Lvovsky, 2001
- Pseudatemelia subochreella (Doubleday, 1859)
- Telechrysis tripuncta (Haworth, 1828)

== Cosmopterigidae ==
- Alloclita mongolica Sinev, [1993]
- Anatrachyntis biorrhizae Sinev, 1985
- Ashibusa jezoensis Matsumura, 1931
- Coccidiphila gerasimovi Danilevsky, 1950
- Cosmopterix argentitegulella Sinev, 1985
- Cosmopterix asignella Sinev, 1988
- Cosmopterix asymmetrella Sinev, 1993
- Cosmopterix chasanica Sinev, 1985
- Cosmopterix ermolaevi Sinev, 1985
- Cosmopterix feminella Sinev, 1988
- Cosmopterix geminella Sinev, 1985
- Cosmopterix gracilis Sinev, 1985
- Cosmopterix infundibulella Sinev, 1988
- Cosmopterix kurokoi Sinev, 1985
- Cosmopterix laetificoides Sinev, 1993
- Cosmopterix lienigiella Zeller, 1846
- Cosmopterix maritimella Sinev, 1985
- Cosmopterix omelkoi Sinev, 1993
- Cosmopterix orichalcea Stainton, 1861
- Cosmopterix phyladelphella Sinev, 1985
- Cosmopterix rhynchognathosella Sinev, 1985
- Cosmopterix sapporensis (Matsumura, 1931)
- Cosmopterix schmidiella Frey, 1856
- Cosmopterix scribaiella Zeller, 1850
- Cosmopterix setariella Sinev, 1985
- Cosmopterix sibirica Sinev, 1985
- Cosmopterix splendens Sinev, 1985
- Cosmopterix sublaetifica Kuroko, 1982
- Cosmopterix subsplendens Sinev, 1988
- Cosmopterix zieglerella (Hübner, 1810)
- Diversivalva minutella Sinev, 1991
- Eteobalea albiapicella (Duponchel, 1843)
- Eteobalea anonymella (Riedl, 1965)
- Eteobalea eurinella Sinev, 1986
- Eteobalea intermediella (Riedl, 1966)
- Eteobalea serratella (Treitschke, 1833)
- Eteobalea tririvella (Staudinger, 1871)
- Labdia citracma Meyrick, 1915
- Labdia fasciella Sinev, 1993
- Labdia stagmatophorella Sinev, 1993
- Limnaecia phragmitella Stainton, 1851
- Macrobathra nomaea Meyrick, 1914
- Pancalia gaedikei Sinev, 1985
- Pancalia hexachrysa (Meyrick, 1935)
- Pancalia isshikii Matsumura, 1931
- Pancalia leuwenhoekella (Linnaeus, 1761)
- Pancalia nodosella (Bruand, 1851)
- Pancalia schwarzella (Fabricius, 1798)
- Pancalia sichotella Christoph, 1882
- Pancalia swetlanae Sinev, 1985
- Pyroderces argyrogrammos (Zeller, 1847)
- Pyroderces caesaris Gozmány, 1957
- Pyroderces orientella Sinev, 1993
- Pyroderces sarcogypsa (Meyrick, 1932)
- Ressia quercidentella Sinev, 1988
- Stagmatophora heydeniella (Fischer von Röslerstamm, [1841])
- Vulcaniella extremella (Wocke, 1871)
- Vulcaniella grandiferella Sinev, 1986
- Vulcaniella pomposella (Zeller, 1839)

== Chrysopeleiidae ==
- Ascalenia decolorella Sinev, 1984
- Ascalenia vanella (Frey, 1860)
- Ascalenia viviparella Kasy, 1969
- Calycobathra calligoni Sinev, 1979
- Calycobathra variapenella Sinev, 1984
- Perimede citeriella Sinev, 1986
- Perimede decimanella Sinev, 1986
- Periploca palaearcticella Sinev, 1986
- Sorhagenia dahurica Sinev, 1986
- Sorhagenia griseella Sinev, 1993
- Sorhagenia janiszewskae Riedl, 1962
- Sorhagenia lophyrella (Douglas, 1846)
- Sorhagenia maurella Sinev, 1993
- Sorhagenia rhamniella (Zeller, 1839)
- Sorhagenia riedli Sinev, 1986
- Sorhagenia vicariella Sinev, 1993

== Gelechiidae ==
- Acompsia bidzilyai Huemer & Karsholt, 2002
- Acompsia caucasella Huemer & Karsholt, 2002
- Acompsia cinerella (Clerck, 1759)
- Acompsia maculosella (Stainton, 1851)
- Acompsia schmidtiellus (Heyden, 1848)
- Acompsia subpunctella Svensson, 1966
- Acompsia tripunctella ([Denis & Schiffermüller], 1775)
- Agnippe albidorsella (Snellen, 1884)
- Agnippe echinuloides Bidzilya & H.H. Li, 2010
- Agnippe novisyrictis (Li, 1993)
- Agnippe pseudolella (Christoph, 1888)
- Agnippe syrictis (Meyrick, 1936)
- Agnippe zhouzhiensis (Li, 1993)
- Agonochaetia impunctella (Caradja, 1920)
- Agonochaetia intermedia Sattler, 1968
- Agonochaetia lvovskyi Bidzilya, 2001
- Agonochaetia tuvella Bidzilya, 2000
- Altenia inscriptella (Christoph, 1882)
- Altenia perspersella (Wocke, 1862)
- Altenia scriptella (Hilbner, 1796)
- Anacampsis anisogramma (Meyrick, 1927)
- Anacampsis blattariella (Hübner, 1796)
- Anacampsis cincticulella (Herrich-Schäffer, 1854)
- Anacampsis fuscella (Eversmann, 1844)
- Anacampsis homoplasta (Meyrick, 1932)
- Anacampsis lignaria (Meyrick, 1926)
- Anacampsis mongolicae Park, 1988
- Anacampsis obscurella ([Denis & Schiffermüller], 1775)
- Anacampsis okui Park, 1988
- Anacampsis populella (Clerck, 1759)
- Anacampsis scintillella (Fischer von Röslerstamm, [1841])
- Anacampsis solemnella (Christoph, 1882)
- Anacampsis temerella (Lienig & Zeller, 1846)
- Anacampsis timidella (Wocke, 1887)
- Ananarsia bipinnata (Meyrick, 1932)
- Ananarsia eleagnella (Kuznetzov, 1957)
- Ananarsia lineatella (Zeller, 1839)
- Anarsia bimaculata Ponomarenko, 1989
- Anarsia sibirica Park & Ponomarenko, 1996
- Anarsia spartiella (Schrank, 1802)
- Anarsia stepposella Ponomarenko, 2002
- Anasphaltis renigerella (Zeller, 1839)
- Angustialata gemmellaformis Omelko, 1988
- Apodia bifractella (Duponchel, 1843)
- Aproaerema anthyllidella (Hübner, [1813])
- Aproaerema longihamata Li, 1993
- Argolamprotes micella ([Denis & Schiffermüller], 1775)
- Aristotelia baltica A. Šulcs & I. Šulcs, 1983
- Aristotelia brizella (Treitschke, 1833)
- Aristotelia calastomella (Christoph, 1872)
- Aristotelia coeruleopictella (Caradja, 1920)
- Aristotelia decoratella (Staudinger, 1879)
- Aristotelia decurtella (Hübner, [1813])
- Aristotelia drosocrypta Meyrick, 1926
- Aristotelia ericinella (Zeller, 1839)
- Aristotelia mirabilis (Christoph, 1888)
- Aristotelia pancaliella (Staudinger, 1871)
- Aristotelia subdecurtella (Stainton, 1859)
- Aristotelia subericinella (Duponchel, 1843)
- Aristotelia varia Omelko, 1999
- Aroga aristotelis (Millière, 1876)
- Aroga flavicomella (Zeller, 1839)
- Aroga genuina Omelko, 1999
- Aroga gozmanyi Park, 1991
- Aroga mesostrepta (Meyrick, 1932)
- Aroga pascuicola (Staudinger, 1871)
- Aroga trilineella (Chambers, 1877)
- Aroga velocella (Zeller, 1839)
- Athrips adumbratella Snellen, 1884
- Athrips amoenella (Frey, 1882)
- Athrips aquila Junnilainen, 2010
- Athrips bidzilyai Junnilainen, 2010
- Athrips kerzhneri Piskunov, 1990
- Athrips kostjuki Bidzilya, 2005
- Athrips mouffetella (Linnaeus, 1758)
- Athrips nigricostella (Duponchel, 1842)
- Athrips nigrogrisea (Kolmakova, 1958)
- Athrips patockai (Povolny, 1979)
- Athrips polymaculella Park, 1991
- Athrips pruinosella (Lienig & Zeller, 1846)
- Athrips rancidella (Hemch-Schaffer, 1854)
- Athrips sibirica Bidzilya, 2005
- Athrips spiraeae (Staudinger, 1871)
- Athrips stepposa Bidzilya, 2005
- Athrips tetrapunctella (Thunberg, 1794)
- Atremaea exstans (Meyrick, 1926)
- Atremaea lonchoptera Staudinger, 1871
- Aulidiotis bicolor Moriuti, 1977
- Bagdadia claviformis (Park, 1993)
- Bagdadia gnomia (Ponomarenko, 1995)
- Battaristis majuscula Omelko, 1993
- Battaristis minuscula Omelko, 1993
- Brachmia blandella (Fabricius, 1798)
- Brachmia dimidiella ([Denis & Schiffermüller], 1775)
- Brachmia inornatella (Douglas, 1850)
- Brachmia procursella Rebel, 1903
- Brachmia vialis Omelko, 1999
- Bryotropha affinis (Haworth, 1828)
- Bryotropha basaltinella (Zeller, 1839)
- Bryotropha boreella (Douglas, 1851)
- Bryotropha desertella (Douglas, 1850)
- Bryotropha galbanella (Zeller, 1839)
- Bryotropha nupponeni Karsholt & Rutten, 2005
- Bryotropha parapurpurella Bidzilya, 1998
- Bryotropha plantariella (Tengstrom, 1848)
- Bryotropha purpurella (Zetterstedt, 1839)
- Bryotropha rossica Anikin & Piskunov, 1996
- Bryotropha senectella (Zeller, 1839)
- Bryotropha similis (Stainton, 1854)
- Bryotropha svenssoni Park, 1984
- Bryotropha terrella ([Denis & Schiffermüller], 1775)
- Bryotropha umbrosella (Zeller, 1839)
- Carpatolechia aenigma (Sattler, 1983)
- Carpatolechia alburnella (Zeller, 1839)
- Carpatolechia daehania (Park, 1993)
- Carpatolechia decorella (Haworth, 1812)
- Carpatolechia epomidella (Tengstrom, 1869)
- Carpatolechia filipjevi (Lvovsky & Piskunov, 1993)
- Carpatolechia fugacella (Zeller, 1839)
- Carpatolechia fugitivella (Zeller, 1839)
- Carpatolechia fuscoalata (Omelko, 1993)
- Carpatolechia nigricantis (Omelko, 1993)
- Carpatolechia notatella (Hübner, [1813])
- Carpatolechia proximella (Hübner, 1796)
- Caryocolum alsinella (Zeller, 1868)
- Caryocolum amaurella (M. Hering, 1924)
- Caryocolum blandella (Douglas, 1852)
- Caryocolum blandelloides Karsholt, 1981
- Caryocolum cassella (Walker, 1864)
- Caryocolum fischerella (Treitschke, 1833)
- Caryocolum huebneri (Haworth, 1828)
- Caryocolum junctella (Douglas, 1851)
- Caryocolum kroesmanniella (Herrich-Schäffer, 1854)
- Caryocolum leucomelanella (Zeller, 1839)
- Caryocolum mongolense Povolny, 1969
- Caryocolum oculatella (Thomann, 1930)
- Caryocolum petrophila (Preissecker, 1914)
- Caryocolum petryi (Hofmann, 1899)
- Caryocolum proxima (Haworth, 1828)
- Caryocolum pullatella (Tengstrom, 1848)
- Caryocolum repentis Huemer & Luquet, 1992
- Caryocolum schleichi (Christoph, 1872)
- Caryocolum tischeriella (Zeller, 1839)
- Caryocolum trauniellum (Zeller, 1868)
- Caryocolum tricolorella (Haworth, 1812)
- Caryocolum vicinella (Douglas, 1851)
- Caryocolum viscariella (Stainton, 1855)
- Catatinagma kraterella Junnilainen & Nuppoen, 2010
- Catatinagma trivittellum Rebel, 1903
- Caulastrocecis furfurella (Staudinger, 1871)
- Caulastrocecis interstratella (Christoph, 1872)
- Caulastrocecis perexigella Junnilainen, 2010
- Chionodes aprilella Huemer & Sattler, 1995
- Chionodes borzella Bidzilya, 2000
- Chionodes caucasicella Huemer & Sattler, 1995
- Chionodes continuella (Zeller, 1839)
- Chionodes distinctella (Zeller, 1839)
- Chionodes electella (Zeller, 1839)
- Chionodes flavipalpella Huemer & Sattler, 1995
- Chionodes fumatella (Douglas, 1850)
- Chionodes holosericella (Herrich-Schäffer, 1854)
- Chionodes ignorantella (Herrich-Schäffer, 1854)
- Chionodes luctuella (Hübner, 1793)
- Chionodes lugubrella (Fabricius, 1794)
- Chionodes mongolica Piskunov, 1979
- Chionodes nubilella (Zetterstedt, 1839)
- Chionodes praeclarella (Herrich-Schäffer, 1854)
- Chionodes sagayica (Kodak, 1986)
- Chionodes soella Huemer & Sattler, 1995
- Chionodes tannuolella (Rebel, 1917)
- Chionodes tantella Huemer & Sattler, 1995
- Chionodes tragicella (Heyden, 1865)
- Chionodes ukokensis Bidzilya, 2005
- Chionodes viduella (Fabricius, 1794)
- Chionodes violacea (Tengstrom, 1848)
- Chorivalva bisaccula Omelko, 1988
- Chorivalva grandialata Omelko, 1988
- Chorivalva unisaccula Omelko, 1988
- Chrysoesthia drurella (Fabricius, 1775)
- Chrysoesthia eppelsheimi (Staudinger, 1885)
- Chrysoesthia falkovitshi Lvovsky & Piskunov, 1989
- Chrysoesthia sexguttella (Thunberg, 1794)
- Chrysoesthia tuvella Bidzilya, 2005
- Cnaphostola angustella Omelko, 1984
- Cnaphostola biformis Omelko, 1984
- Cnaphostola venustalis Omelko, 1984
- Coloptilia conchylidella (Hofmann, 1898)
- Concubina euryzeucta (Meyrick, 1922)
- Cosmardia moritzella (Treitschke, 1835)
- Crossobela trinotella (Herrich-Schäffer, 1856)
- Dactylotula kinkerella (Snellen, 1876)
- Daltopora felixi Povolny, 1979
- Daltopora sinanensis Sakamaki, 1995
- Deltophora korbi (Caradja, 1920)
- Dendrophilia albidella (Snellen, 1884)
- Dendrophilia caraganella Ponomarenko, 1993
- Dendrophilia leguminella Ponomarenko, 1993
- Dendrophilia mediofasciana (Park, 1991)
- Dendrophilia neotaphronoma Ponomarenko, 1993
- Dendrophilia petrinopsis (Meyrick, 1935)
- Dendrophilia solitaria Ponomarenko, 1993
- Dendrophilia unicolorella Ponomarenko, 1993
- Dichomeris alacella (Zeller, 1839)
- Dichomeris barbella ([Denis & Schiffermüller], 1775)
- Dichomeris beljaevi Ponomarenko, 1998
- Dichomeris bulawskii Ponomarenko & Park, 1996
- Dichomeris chinganella (Christoph, 1882)
- Dichomeris christophi Ponomarenko & Mey, 2002
- Dichomeris consertella (Christoph, 1882)
- Dichomeris cuspis Park, 1994
- Dichomeris derasella ([Denis & Schiffermüller], 1775)
- Dichomeris harmonias Meyrick, 1922
- Dichomeris heriguronis (Matsumura, 1931)
- Dichomeris imperviella Ponomarenko & Omelko, 2003
- Dichomeris juniperella (Linnaeus, 1761)
- Dichomeris kuznetzovi Ponomarenko, 1998
- Dichomeris latipennella (Rebel, 1937)
- Dichomeris lespedezae Park, 1994
- Dichomeris limosellus (Schlager, 1849)
- Dichomeris litoxyla Meyrick, 1937
- Dichomeris liui (Li & Zheng, 1996)
- Dichomeris lucistrialella Ponomarenko & Omelko, 2003
- Dichomeris magnimaculata Ponomarenko & Omelko, 2003
- Dichomeris marginella (Fabricius, 1781)
- Dichomeris minutia Park, 1994
- Dichomeris oceanis Meyrick, 1920
- Dichomeris okadai (Moriuti, 1982)
- Dichomeris polypunctata Park, 1994
- Dichomeris praevacua Meyrick, 1922
- Dichomeris pusilella Ponomarenko & Omelko, 2003
- Dichomeris qinlingensis (Li & Zheng, 1996)
- Dichomeris rasilella (Herrich-Schäffer, 1854)
- Dichomeris silvania Ponomarenko & Omelko, 2003
- Dichomeris silvestrella Ponomarenko, 1998
- Dichomeris sparsella (Christoph, 1882)
- Dichomeris syndyas Meyrick, 1926
- Dichomeris ustalella (Fabricius, 1794)
- Dichomeris vernariella Bidzilya, 1998
- Dichomeris vixidistinctella Ponomarenko & Omelko, 2003
- Dirhinosia cervinella (Eversmann, 1844)
- Encolapta catarina (Ponomarenko, 1994)
- Encolapta subtegulifera (Ponomarenko, 1994)
- Encolapta tegulifera (Meyrick, 1932)
- Ephysteris deserticolella (Staudinger, 1870)
- Ephysteris insulella (Heinemann, 1870)
- Ephysteris inustella (Zeller, 1847)
- Ephysteris promptella (Staudinger, 1859)
- Ephysteris subovatus (Povolny, 2001)
- Ephysteris tenuisaccus Nupponen, 2010
- Epidola stigma Staudinger, 1859
- Eulamprotes atrella ([Denis & Schiffermüller], 1775)
- Eulamprotes libertinella (Zeller, 1872)
- Eulamprotes plumbella (Heinemann, 1870)
- Eulamprotes superbella (Zeller, 1839)
- Eulamprotes unicolorella (Duponchel, 1843)
- Eulamprotes wilkella (Linnaeus, 1758)
- Exoteleia dodecella (Linnaeus, 1758)
- Faristenia acerella Ponomarenko, 1991
- Faristenia furtumella Ponomarenko, 1991
- Faristenia geminisignella Ponomarenko, 1991
- Faristenia maritimella Ponomarenko, 1991
- Faristenia nemoriella Ponomarenko, 1998
- Faristenia omelkoi Ponomarenko, 1991
- Faristenia quercivora Ponomarenko, 1991
- Faristenia ussuriella Ponomarenko, 1991
- Filatima angustipennis Sattler, 1961
- Filatima autocrossa (Meyrick, 1936)
- Filatima bidentella Bidzilya, 1998
- Filatima djakovica Anikin & Piskunov, 1996
- Filatima fontisella Lvovsky & Piskunov, 1989
- Filatima incomptella (Herrich-Schäffer, 1854)
- Filatima nigrimediella Bidzilya, 1998
- Filatima pallipalpella (Snellen, 1884)
- Filatima sciocrypta (Meyrick, 1926)
- Filatima spurcella (Duponchel, 1843)
- Filatima tephriditella (Duponchel, 1844)
- Filatima transsilvanella Z. Kovács & S. Kovács, 2001
- Filatima zagulajevi Anikin & Piskunov, 1996
- Gelechia albomaculata Omelko, 1986
- Gelechia anomorcta Meyrick, 1926
- Gelechia atlanticella (Amsel, 1955)
- Gelechia atrofusca Omelko, 1986
- Gelechia basipunctella Herrich-Schäffer, 1854
- Gelechia clandestina Omelko, 1986
- Gelechia cuneatella Douglas, 1852
- Gelechia fuscooculata Omelko, 1986
- Gelechia hippophaella (Schrank, 1802)
- Gelechia inconspicua Omelko, 1986
- Gelechia jakovlevi Krulikowsky, 1905
- Gelechia muscosella Zeller, 1839
- Gelechia nigra (Haworth, 1828)
- Gelechia notabilis Omelko, 1986
- Gelechia rhombella ([Denis & Schiffermüller], 1775)
- Gelechia rhombelliformis Staudinger, 1871
- Gelechia sabinellus (Zeller, 1839)
- Gelechia scotinella Herrich-Schäffer, 1854
- Gelechia senticetella (Staudinger, 1859)
- Gelechia sestertiella Herrich-Schäffer, 1854
- Gelechia sirotina Omelko, 1986
- Gelechia sororculella (Hübner, [1817])
- Gelechia teleiodella Omelko, 1986
- Gelechia turpella ([Denis & Schiffermüller], 1775)
- Gladiovalva badidorsella (Rebel, 1935)
- Gnorimoschema bodillum Karsholt & Nielsen, 1974
- Gnorimoschema epithymellum (Staudinger, 1859)
- Gnorimoschema herbichii (Nowicki, 1864)
- Gnorimoschema jalavai Povolny, 1994
- Gnorimoschema mikkolai Povolny, 1994
- Gnorimoschema nordlandicolella (Strand, 1902)
- Gnorimoschema robustella (Staudinger, 1871)
- Gnorimoschema steueri Povolny, 1975
- Gnorimoschema streliciella (Herrich-Schäffer, 1854)
- Gnorimoschema valesiella (Staudinger, 1877)
- Harpagidia magnetella (Staudinger, 1870)
- Hedma karsholti Nupponen, 2010
- Helcystogramma albinervis (Gerasimov, 1929)
- Helcystogramma arulensis (Rebe1, 1929)
- Helcystogramma claripunctella Ponomarenko, 1998
- Helcystogramma compositaepictum (N.Omelko & Omelko, 1993)
- Helcystogramma flavescens Junnilainen, 2010
- Helcystogramma flavilineolella Ponomarenko, 1998
- Helcystogramma ineruditum (Meyrick, 1926)
- Helcystogramma lineolella (Zeller, 1839)
- Helcystogramma lutatella Herrich-Schäffer, 1854)
- Helcystogramma perelegans (N.Omelko & Omelko, 1993)
- Helcystogramma rufescens (Haworth, 1828)
- Helcystogramma triannulella (Herrich-Schäffer, 1854)
- Holcophora statices Staudinger, 1871
- Hypatima excellentella Ponomarenko, 1991
- Hypatima rhomboidella (Linnaeus, 1758)
- Hypatima venefica Ponomarenko, 1991
- Iridesna rutilella (Snellen, 1884)
- Isophrictis anthemidella (Wocke, 1871)
- Isophrictis striatella (Denis & Schiffermüller, 1775)
- Istrianis brucinella (Mann, 1872)
- Ivanauskiella psamathias (Meyrick, 1891)
- Iwaruna biguttella (Duponchel, 1843)
- Kiwaia kostjuki Povolny, 2001
- Kiwaia palaearctica Povolny, 1968
- Klimeschiopsis discontinuella (Rebel, 1899)
- Klimeschiopsis kiningerella (Duponchel, 1843)
- Lutilabria kaszabi Povolny, 1978
- Lutilabria lutilabrella (Mann, 1857)
- Lutilabria prolata Junnilainen & Nupponen, 2010
- Lutilabria volgensis Anikin & Piskunov, 1996
- Megacraspedus albovenata Junnilainen, 2010
- Megacraspedus argyroneurellus Staudinger, 1876
- Megacraspedus attritellus Staudinger, 1871
- Megacraspedus balneariellus (Chrétien, 1907)
- Megacraspedus binotellus (Duponchel, 1843)
- Megacraspedus dolosellus (Zeller, 1839)
- Megacraspedus fallax (Mann, 1867)
- Megacraspedus lagopellus Herrich-Schäffer, 1860
- Megacraspedus leuca (Filipjev, 1929)
- Megacraspedus litovalvellus Junnilainen, 2010
- Megacraspedus longipalpella Junnilainen, 2010
- Megacraspedus multispinella Junnilainen & Nupponen, 2010
- Megacraspedus niphorrhoa (Meyrick, 1926)
- Megacraspedus orenburgensis Junnilainen & Nupponen, 2010
- Megacraspedus separatellus (Fischer von Röslerstamm, [1843])
- Mesophleps oxycedrella (Milliere, 1871)
- Mesophleps silacella (Hübner, 1796)
- Metanarsia dahurica Bidzilya, 2005
- Metanarsia guberlica Nupponen, 2010
- Metanarsia incertella (Herrich-Schäffer, 1861)
- Metanarsia modesta Staudinger, 1871
- Metanarsia onzella Christoph, 1887
- Metanarsia scythiella Ponomarenko, 2000
- Metzneria aestivella (Zeller, 1839)
- Metzneria aprilella (Herrich-Schäffer, 1854)
- Metzneria artificella (Herrich-Schäffer, 1861)
- Metzneria diffusella Englert, 1974
- Metzneria ehikeella Gozmány, 1954
- Metzneria filia Piskunov, 1979
- Metzneria inflammatella (Christoph, 1882)
- Metzneria kerzhneri Piskunov, 1979
- Metzneria lappella (Linnaeus, 1758)
- Metzneria littorella (Douglas, 1850)
- Metzneria metzneriella (Stainton, 1851)
- Metzneria neuropterella (Zeller, 1839)
- Metzneria paucipunctella (Zeller, 1839)
- Metzneria santolinella (Amsel, 1936)
- Metzneria subflavella Englert, 1974
- Mirificarma cytisella (Treitschke, 1833)
- Mirificarma eburnella ([Denis & Schiffermüller], 1775)
- Mirificarma lentiginosella (Zeller, 1839)
- Mirificarma maculatella (Hilbner, 1796)
- Mirificarma mulinella (Zeller, 1839)
- Monochroa conspersella (Herrich-Schäffer, 1854)
- Monochroa cytisella (Curtis, 1837)
- Monochroa divisella (Douglas, 1850)
- Monochroa elongella (Heinemann, 1870)
- Monochroa ferrea (Frey, 1870)
- Monochroa hornigi (Staudinger, 1883)
- Monochroa inflexella Svensson, 1992
- Monochroa lucidella (Stephens, 1834)
- Monochroa lutulentella (Zeller, 1839)
- Monochroa moyses Uffen, 1991
- Monochroa nomadella (Zeller, 1868)
- Monochroa palustrella (Douglas, 1850)
- Monochroa parvulata Gozmány, 1957
- Monochroa pessocrossa (Meyrick, 1926)
- Monochroa rufulella (Snellen, 1884)
- Monochroa rumicetella (Hofmann, 1868)
- Monochroa saltenella (Benander, 1928)
- Monochroa sepicolella (Herrich-Schäffer, 1854)
- Monochroa servella (Zeller, 1839)
- Monochroa simplicella (Lienig & Zeller, 1846)
- Monochroa suffusella (Douglas, 1850)
- Monochroa tenebrella (Hübner, [1817])
- Monochroa tetragonella (Stainton, 1885)
- Monochroa uralensis Junnilainen, 2010
- Neofaculta ericetella (Geyer, 1832)
- Neofaculta infernella (Herrich-Schäffer, 1854)
- Neofaculta taigana Ponomarenko, 1998
- Neofriseria caucasicella Sattler, 1960
- Neofriseria kuznetzovae Bidzilya, 2002
- Neofriseria mongolinella Piskunov, 1987
- Neofriseria peliella (Treitschke, 1835)
- Neofriseria sceptrophora (Meyrick, 1926)
- Neofriseria singula (Staudinger, 1876)
- Nothris lemniscella (Zeller, 1839)
- Nothris verbascella ([Denis & Schiffermüller], 1775)
- Nuntia incognitella (Caradja, 1920)
- Ornativalva heluanensis (Debski, 1913)
- Ornativalva mixolitha (Meyrick, 1918)
- Ornativalva ornatella Sattler, 1967
- Ornativalva plutelliformis (Staudinger, 1859)
- Ornativalva sieversi (Staudinger, 1871)
- Parachronistis albiceps (Zeller, 1839)
- Parachronistis conjunctionis Omelko, 1986
- Parachronistis fumea Omelko, 1986
- Parachronistis incerta Omelko, 1986
- Parachronistis jiriensis Park, 1985
- Parachronistis juglandeti Omelko, 1986
- Parachronistis maritima Omelko, 1986
- Parachronistis sellaris Park, 1985
- Paranarsia joannisiella Ragonot, 1895
- Parapodia sinaica (Frauenfeld, 1859)
- Parastenolechia argobathra (Meyrick, 1935)
- Parastenolechia collucata (Omelko, 1988)
- Parastenolechia nigrinotella (Zeller, 1847)
- Parastenolechia superba (Omeiko, 1988)
- Pexicopia malvella (Hübner, [1805])
- Photodotis adornata Omelko, 1993
- Photodotis palens Omelko, 1993
- Phthorimaea operculella (Zeller, 1873)
- Phthorimaea practicolella (Christoph, 1872)
- Piskunovia reductionis Omelko, 1988
- Platyedra subcinerea (Haworth, 1828)
- Pogochaetia dmitrii Bidzilya, 2005
- Polyhymno attenuata (Omelko, 1993)
- Polyhymno celata (Omelko, 1993)
- Polyhymno corylella (Omelko, 1993)
- Polyhymno fusca (Omelko, 1993)
- Polyhymno fuscobasis (Omelko, 1993)
- Polyhymno indistincta (Omelko, 1993)
- Polyhymno obliquata (Matsumura, 1931)
- Polyhymno pontifera (Meyrick, 1934)
- Polyhymno subocellea (Stephens, 1834)
- Polyhymno trapezoidella (Caradja, 1920)
- Polyhymno trichoma (Caradja, 1920)
- Prolita sexpunctella (Fabricius, 1794)
- Prolita solutella (Zeller, 1839)
- Protoparachronistis concolor Omelko, 1986
- Protoparachronistis discedens Omelko, 1986
- Protoparachronistis initialis Omelko, 1986
- Protoparachronistis policapitis Omelko, 1993
- Psamathocrita osseella (Stainton, 1861)
- Pseudotelphusa acrobrunella (Park, 1992)
- Pseudotelphusa paripunctella (Thunberg, 1794)
- Pseudotelphusa scalella (Scopoli, 1763)
- Psoricoptera arenicolor Omelko, 1999
- Psoricoptera gibbosella (Zeller, 1839)
- Psoricoptera speciosella Teich, 1892
- Ptocheuusa abnormella (Herrich-Schäffer, 1854)
- Ptocheuusa inopella (Zeller, 1839)
- Ptocheuusa paupella (Zeller, 1847)
- Ptocheuusa sublutella Christoph, 1872
- Pyncostola bohemiella (Nickerl, 1864)
- Recurvaria comprobata (Meyrick, 1935)
- Recurvaria leucatella (Clerck, 1759)
- Recurvaria nanella ([Denis & Schiffermüller], 1775)
- Recurvaria toxicodendri Kuznetzov, 1979
- Scrobipalpa acuminatella (Sircom, 1850)
- Scrobipalpa adaptata (Povolný, 2001)
- Scrobipalpa arenbergeri Povolny, 1973
- Scrobipalpa artemisiella (Treitschke, 1833)
- Scrobipalpa atriplicella (Fischer von Röslerstamm, [1841])
- Scrobipalpa bezengensis (Povolny, 2001)
- Scrobipalpa bidzilyai (Povolry, 2001)
- Scrobipalpa brahmiella (Heyden, 1862)
- Scrobipalpa brandti Povolny, 1972
- Scrobipalpa bryophiloides Povolny, 1966
- Scrobipalpa chitensis (Povolny, 2001)
- Scrobipalpa chrysanthemella (Hofmann, 1867)
- Scrobipalpa clintoni Povolny, 1968
- Scrobipalpa costella (Humphreys & Westwood, 1845)
- Scrobipalpa disjectella (Staudinger, 1859)
- Scrobipalpa dorsoflava (Povolný, 1996)
- Scrobipalpa erichi Povolny, 1964
- Scrobipalpa ferruginosa (Povolny, 2001)
- Scrobipalpa filia Povolny, 1969
- Scrobipalpa fraterna Povolny, 1969
- Scrobipalpa frugifera Povolny, 1969
- Scrobipalpa gallicella (Constant, 1885)
- Scrobipalpa gregori Povolny, 1967
- Scrobipalpa grisea Povolny, 1969
- Scrobipalpa halonella (Herrich-Schäffer, 1854)
- Scrobipalpa hannemanni Povolny, 1966
- Scrobipalpa heretica Povolny, 1973
- Scrobipalpa hyoscyamella (Stainton, 1869)
- Scrobipalpa hypothetica Povolny, 1973
- Scrobipalpa indignella (Staudinger, 1879)
- Scrobipalpa intima (Povolny, 2001)
- Scrobipalpa klimeschi Povolny, 1967
- Scrobipalpa kyrana (Povolny, 2001)
- Scrobipalpa lagodes (Meyrick, 1926)
- Scrobipalpa lutea Povolný, 1977
- Scrobipalpa magnificella Povolný, 1967
- Scrobipalpa maniaca Povolny, 1969
- Scrobipalpa murinella (Duponchel, 1843)
- Scrobipalpa nitentella (Fuchs, 1902)
- Scrobipalpa notata (Povolný, 2001)
- Scrobipalpa obsoletella (Fischer von Röslerstamm, [1841])
- Scrobipalpa ocellatella (Boyd, 1858)
- Scrobipalpa optima (Povolny, 2001)
- Scrobipalpa phagnalella (Constant, 1895)
- Scrobipalpa pinosa (Povolny, 2001)
- Scrobipalpa plesiopicta Povolný, 1969
- Scrobipalpa proclivella (Fuchs, 1886)
- Scrobipalpa pseudobsoletella (Povolny & Gregor, 1955)
- Scrobipalpa pulchra Povolný, 1967
- Scrobipalpa punctata (Povolný, 1996)
- Scrobipalpa rebeli (Preissecker, 1914)
- Scrobipalpa rjabovi Piskunov, 1990
- Scrobipalpa salinella (Zeller, 1847)
- Scrobipalpa samadensis (Pfaffenzeller, 1870)
- Scrobipalpa similis Povolny, 1973
- Scrobipalpa spumata (Povolny, 2001)
- Scrobipalpa subnitens Povolny, 1969
- Scrobipalpa tenebrata (Povolny, 2001)
- Scrobipalpa usingeri Povolny, 1969
- Scrobipalpa ustulatella (Staudinger, 1871)
- Scrobipalpa vasconiella (Rossler, 1877)
- Scrobipalpula diffluella (Frey, 1870)
- Scrobipalpula psilella (Herrich-Schäffer, 1854)
- Scrobipalpula ramosella (Muller-Rutz, 1934)
- Scrobipalpula tussilaginis (Stainton, 1867)
- Sergeya temulenta (Omelko, 1998)
- Sitotroga cerealella (Olivier, 1789)
- Sophronia cassignatella Herrich-Schäffer, 1854
- Sophronia chilonella (Treitschke, 1833)
- Sophronia consanguinella (Herrich-Schäffer, 1855)
- Sophronia gelidella Nordman, 1941
- Sophronia humerella ([Denis & Schiffermüller], 1775)
- Sophronia iciculata Omelko, 1999
- Sophronia marginella Toll, 1936
- Sophronia semicostella (Hübner, [1813])
- Sophronia sicariellus (Zeller, 1839)
- Spiniphallellus desertus Bidzilya & Karsholt, 2008
- Stegasta abdita Park & Omelko, 1994
- Stenoalata macra Omelko, 1998
- Stenolechia gemmella (Linnaeus, 1758)
- Stenolechia notomochla Meyrick, 1935
- Stomopteryx bolschewikiella (Caradja, 1920)
- Stomopteryx detersella (Zeller, 1847)
- Stomopteryx lineolella (Eversmann, 1844)
- Stomopteryx mongolica Povolny, 1975
- Stomopteryx orthogonella (Staudinger, 1871)
- Stomopteryx remissella (Zeller, 1847)
- Streyella anguinella (Herrich-Schäffer, 1861)
- Syncopacma albifrontella (Heinemann, 1870)
- Syncopacma altaica Bidzilya, 2005
- Syncopacma azosterella (Herrich-Schäffer, 1855)
- Syncopacma captivella (Herrich-Schäffer, 1854)
- Syncopacma centralis Piskunov, 1979
- Syncopacma cinctella (Clerck, 1759)
- Syncopacma cincticulella (Bruand, 1850)
- Syncopacma coronillella (Treitschke, 1833)
- Syncopacma incognitana Gozmány, 1957
- Syncopacma karvoneni (Hackman, 1950)
- Syncopacma kutsherenkoi Bidzylya, 1998
- Syncopacma larseniella Gozmány, 1957
- Syncopacma linella (Chrétien, 1904)
- Syncopacma montanata Gozmány, 1957
- Syncopacma ochrofasciella (Toll, 1936)
- Syncopacma polychromella (Rebel, 1902)
- Syncopacma sangiella (Stainton, 1863)
- Syncopacma semicostella (Staudinger, 1870)
- Syncopacma steppicolella Junnilainen, 2010
- Syncopacma suecicella (Wolff, 1958)
- Syncopacma taeniolella (Zeller, 1839)
- Syncopacma vinella (Bankes, 1898)
- Syncopacma wormiella (Wolff, 1958)
- Teleiodes bradleyi Park, 1992
- Teleiodes flavimaculella (Herrich-Schäffer, 1854)
- Teleiodes kaitilai Junnilainen, 2010
- Teleiodes linearivalvata (Moriuti, 1977)
- Teleiodes luculella (Hübner, [1813])
- Teleiodes murina (Omelko, 1998)
- Teleiodes orientalis Park, 1992
- Teleiodes paraluculella Park, 1992
- Teleiodes saltuum (Zeller, 1878)
- Teleiodes simplificata Omelko, 1995
- Teleiodes vulgella ([Denis & Schiffermüller], 1775)
- Teleiodes wagae (Nowicki, 1860)
- Teleiopsis diffinis (Haworth, 1828)
- Tenera vittata Omelko, 1998
- Trichembola unimaculata Omelko, 1993
- Xenolechia aethiops (Humphreys & Westwood, 1845)
- Xystophora carchariella (Zeller, 1839)
- Xystophora kostjuki Bidzilya, 2000
- Xystophora mongolica Emelyanov & Piskunov, 1982
- Xystophora orthogonella (Staudinger, 1870)
- Xystophora psammitella (Snellen, 1884)
- Xystophora pulveratella (Herrich-Schäffer, 1854)
