= Coleophora ceratoidis =

Scientific classification
- Kingdom: Animalia
- Phylum: Arthropoda
- Class: Insecta
- Order: Lepidoptera
- Family: Coleophoridae
- Genus: Coleophora
- Species: C. ceratoidis

Binomial name
- Coleophora ceratoidis (Falkovitsh, 1979)

Synonyms
- Stollia ceratoidis Falkovitsh, 1979

Species of moth

Coleophora ceratoidis is a moth of the family Coleophoridae. It is found in Mongolia, Turkestan, southern Russia and China.

The larvae feed on Ceratoides eversmanniana. They feed on the generative organs of their host plant.
