= Coleophora azishtella =

Scientific classification
- Kingdom: Animalia
- Phylum: Arthropoda
- Class: Insecta
- Order: Lepidoptera
- Family: Coleophoridae
- Genus: Coleophora
- Species: C. azishtella

Binomial name
- Coleophora azishtella Anikin, 1998

Species of moth

Coleophora azishtella is a moth in the family Coleophoridae. It is found in Russia.
