= Coleophora koshmella =

Scientific classification
- Kingdom: Animalia
- Phylum: Arthropoda
- Class: Insecta
- Order: Lepidoptera
- Family: Coleophoridae
- Genus: Coleophora
- Species: C. koshmella

Binomial name
- Coleophora koshmella (Falkovitsh, 1989)

Synonyms
- Aureliania koshmella Falkovitsh, 1989

Species of moth

Coleophora koshmella is a moth of the family Coleophoridae.
