= Ethmia comitella =

Scientific classification
- Domain: Eukaryota
- Kingdom: Animalia
- Phylum: Arthropoda
- Class: Insecta
- Order: Lepidoptera
- Family: Depressariidae
- Genus: Ethmia
- Species: E. comitella

Binomial name
- Ethmia comitella Caradja, 1927

Synonyms
- Ethmia xanthopleura Meyrick, 1931

Species of moth

Ethmia comitella is a moth in the family Depressariidae. It is found in Korea, China and Russia.

Adults have been recorded in early and mid-June.

== Subspecies ==
- Ethmia comitella comitella (China: Central Tien Shan)
- Ethmia comitella steppella Dubatolov et Ustjuzhanin, 1997 (East Siberia)
