= Coleophora echinacea =

Scientific classification
- Kingdom: Animalia
- Phylum: Arthropoda
- Class: Insecta
- Order: Lepidoptera
- Family: Coleophoridae
- Genus: Coleophora
- Species: C. echinacea

Binomial name
- Coleophora echinacea Falkovitsh, 1972

Species of moth

Coleophora echinacea is a moth of the family Coleophoridae. It is found in Mongolia.

The larvae feed on Krascheniunnikovia eversmanniana. They feed on the generative organs of their host plant.
