= Coleophora strigiferella =

Scientific classification
- Kingdom: Animalia
- Phylum: Arthropoda
- Class: Insecta
- Order: Lepidoptera
- Family: Coleophoridae
- Genus: Coleophora
- Species: C. strigiferella

Binomial name
- Coleophora strigiferella Snellen, 1884

Species of moth

Coleophora pauperculella is a moth of the family Coleophoridae that can be found in Irkutsk, eastern Siberia, Russia.
