= Dichomeris vernariella =

Scientific classification
- Domain: Eukaryota
- Kingdom: Animalia
- Phylum: Arthropoda
- Class: Insecta
- Order: Lepidoptera
- Family: Gelechiidae
- Genus: Dichomeris
- Species: D. vernariella

Binomial name
- Dichomeris vernariella Bidzilya, 1998

Species of moth

Dichomeris vernariella is a moth in the family Gelechiidae. It was described by Oleksiy V. Bidzilya in 1998. It is found in the Russian Far East.
