= Coleophora tundrosa =

Scientific classification
- Kingdom: Animalia
- Phylum: Arthropoda
- Class: Insecta
- Order: Lepidoptera
- Family: Coleophoridae
- Genus: Coleophora
- Species: C. tundrosa

Binomial name
- Coleophora tundrosa (Falkovitsh, 1991)

Synonyms
- Klimeschja tundrosa Falkovitsh, 1991

Species of moth

Coleophora tundrosa is a moth of the family Coleophoridae. It is found in southern Russia.
