= Ethmia nigrimaculata =

Scientific classification
- Kingdom: Animalia
- Phylum: Arthropoda
- Class: Insecta
- Order: Lepidoptera
- Family: Depressariidae
- Genus: Ethmia
- Species: E. nigrimaculata

Binomial name
- Ethmia nigrimaculata Sattler, 1967

Species of moth

Ethmia nigrimaculata is a moth in the family Depressariidae. It is found in China (Shansi), Ukraine, Russia (Central Tuva and the southern Chita Province) and probably Mongolia.
