= Coleophora markisaakovitshi =

Scientific classification
- Kingdom: Animalia
- Phylum: Arthropoda
- Class: Insecta
- Order: Lepidoptera
- Family: Coleophoridae
- Genus: Coleophora
- Species: C. markisaakovitshi

Binomial name
- Coleophora markisaakovitshi (Budashkin, 1998)

Synonyms
- Ecebalia markisaakovitshi Budashkin, 1998; Coleophora angustiptera Li & Zheng, 1998

Species of moth

Coleophora markisaakovitshi is a moth of the family Coleophoridae.
