= Coleophora dilabens =

Scientific classification
- Kingdom: Animalia
- Phylum: Arthropoda
- Class: Insecta
- Order: Lepidoptera
- Family: Coleophoridae
- Genus: Coleophora
- Species: C. dilabens

Binomial name
- Coleophora dilabens (Falkovitsh, 1982)

Synonyms
- Ionescumia dilabens Falkovitsh, 1982

Species of moth

Coleophora dilabens is a moth of the family Coleophoridae. It is found in southern Russia, central Asia and Afghanistan. It occurs in semi-desert biotopes.

Adults are on wing in June and July.

The larvae feed on Salsola orientalis. The first instar larvae live in the carpels of their host plant.
