= Coleophora raphidon =

Scientific classification
- Kingdom: Animalia
- Phylum: Arthropoda
- Clade: Pancrustacea
- Class: Insecta
- Order: Lepidoptera
- Family: Coleophoridae
- Genus: Coleophora
- Species: C. raphidon

Binomial name
- Coleophora raphidon Baldizzone & Savenkov, 2002

Species of moth

Coleophora raphidon is a moth of the family Coleophoridae. It is found in Russian Far East.

The wingspan is about 10 mm (0.39 in).
