= Coleophora nairica =

Scientific classification
- Kingdom: Animalia
- Phylum: Arthropoda
- Class: Insecta
- Order: Lepidoptera
- Family: Coleophoridae
- Genus: Coleophora
- Species: C. nairica

Binomial name
- Coleophora nairica (Falkovitsh, 1991)

Synonyms
- Haploptilia nairica Falkovitsh, 1991

Species of moth

Coleophora nairica is a moth of the family Coleophoridae. It is found in Armenia.

The larvae feed on Malus, Pyrus and Prunus species. They feed on the leaves of their host plant.
