= Coleophora subnivea =

Scientific classification
- Kingdom: Animalia
- Phylum: Arthropoda
- Class: Insecta
- Order: Lepidoptera
- Family: Coleophoridae
- Genus: Coleophora
- Species: C. subnivea

Binomial name
- Coleophora subnivea Filipjev, 1926

Species of moth

Coleophora subnivea is a moth of the family Coleophoridae. It is found in the Caucasus of Russia.
