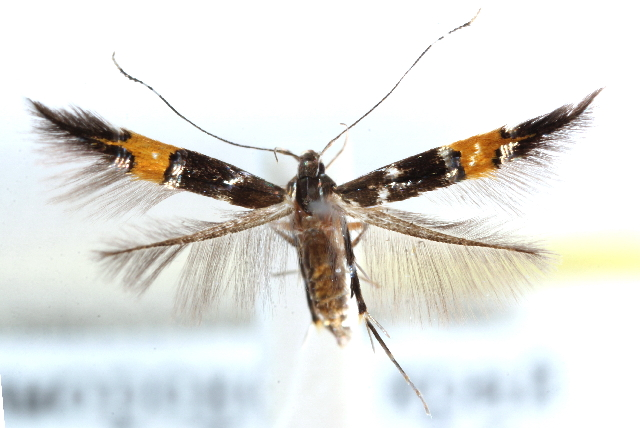

Scientific classification
- Kingdom: Animalia
- Phylum: Arthropoda
- Clade: Pancrustacea
- Class: Insecta
- Order: Lepidoptera
- Family: Cosmopterigidae
- Genus: Cosmopterix
- Species: C. phyladelphella

Binomial name
- Cosmopterix phyladelphella Sinev, 1985

= Cosmopterix phyladelphella =

Species of moth

Cosmopterix phyladelphella is a moth of the family Cosmopterigidae. It is known from Russia.
