= Coleophora macilenta =

Scientific classification
- Kingdom: Animalia
- Phylum: Arthropoda
- Class: Insecta
- Order: Lepidoptera
- Family: Coleophoridae
- Genus: Coleophora
- Species: C. macilenta

Binomial name
- Coleophora macilenta Falkovitsh, 1972

Species of moth

Coleophora macilenta is a moth of the family Coleophoridae. It is found in southern Russia and Mongolia.

The larvae feed on the leaves of Ceratoides eversmanniana and Ceratoides papposa.
