= Coleophora amarchana =

Scientific classification
- Kingdom: Animalia
- Phylum: Arthropoda
- Class: Insecta
- Order: Lepidoptera
- Family: Coleophoridae
- Genus: Coleophora
- Species: C. amarchana

Binomial name
- Coleophora amarchana Falkovitsh, 1975

Synonyms
- Casignetella amarchana

Species of moth

Coleophora amarchana is a moth of the family Coleophoridae. It is found in southern Russia and Mongolia.

Adults are on wing in August.
