= Coleophora irinae =

Scientific classification
- Kingdom: Animalia
- Phylum: Arthropoda
- Clade: Pancrustacea
- Class: Insecta
- Order: Lepidoptera
- Family: Coleophoridae
- Genus: Coleophora
- Species: C. irinae

Binomial name
- Coleophora irinae Baldizzone & Savenkov, 2002

Species of moth

Coleophora irinae is a moth of the family Coleophoridae. It is found in Russian Far East.

The wingspan is about 9 mm (0.35 in).
