= Coleophora genviki =

Scientific classification
- Kingdom: Animalia
- Phylum: Arthropoda
- Class: Insecta
- Order: Lepidoptera
- Family: Coleophoridae
- Genus: Coleophora
- Species: C. genviki

Binomial name
- Coleophora genviki (Anikin, 2002)

Synonyms
- Casignetella genviki Anikin, 2002

Species of moth

Coleophora genviki is a moth of the family Coleophoridae. It is found in southern Russia.
