= Coleophora implicitella =

Scientific classification
- Kingdom: Animalia
- Phylum: Arthropoda
- Class: Insecta
- Order: Lepidoptera
- Family: Coleophoridae
- Genus: Coleophora
- Species: C. implicitella

Binomial name
- Coleophora implicitella Fuchs, 1903

Species of moth

Coleophora implicitella is a moth of the family Coleophoridae. It is found in Armenia.
