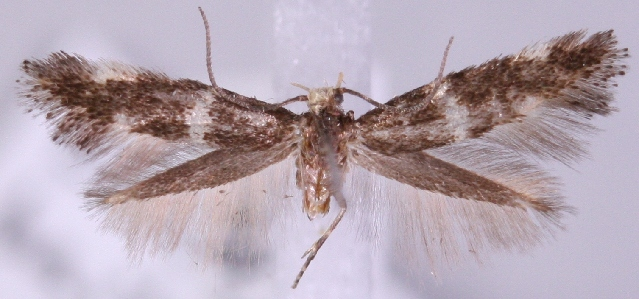
- Elachista baikalica

Scientific classification
- Kingdom: Animalia
- Phylum: Arthropoda
- Class: Insecta
- Order: Lepidoptera
- Family: Elachistidae
- Genus: Elachista
- Species: E. baikalica

Binomial name
- Elachista baikalica Kaila, 1992

= Elachista baikalica =

Species of moth

Elachista baikalica is a moth of the family Elachistidae that is found in Russia (Irkutsk, Altai and the southern Ural Mountains).
