= Coleophora anabaseos =

Scientific classification
- Kingdom: Animalia
- Phylum: Arthropoda
- Class: Insecta
- Order: Lepidoptera
- Family: Coleophoridae
- Genus: Coleophora
- Species: C. anabaseos

Binomial name
- Coleophora anabaseos Falkovitsh, 1978

Synonyms
- Ecebalia anabaseos

Species of moth

Coleophora anabaseos is a moth of the family Coleophoridae. It is found in southern Russia and central Asia. It occurs in desert-steppe and desert biotopes.

Adults are on the wing from end of May to June.

The larvae feed on Anabasis cretaceae, Anabasis elatior and Anabasis aphylla. They feed on the generative organs of their host plant.
