= Coleophora tremula =

Scientific classification
- Kingdom: Animalia
- Phylum: Arthropoda
- Class: Insecta
- Order: Lepidoptera
- Family: Coleophoridae
- Genus: Coleophora
- Species: C. tremula

Binomial name
- Coleophora tremula (Falkovitsh, 1989)

Synonyms
- Casignetella tremula Falkovitsh, 1989

Species of moth

Coleophora tremula is a moth of the family Coleophoridae. It is found in southern Russia and in the deserts of Kazakhstan and central Asia. It occurs in steppe biotopes.

There are two to three generations per year.

The larvae feed on Arthrophytum iliense. They feed on the leaves, flower buds and fruits of their host plant.
