= Coleophora eremosparti =

Scientific classification
- Kingdom: Animalia
- Phylum: Arthropoda
- Class: Insecta
- Order: Lepidoptera
- Family: Coleophoridae
- Genus: Coleophora
- Species: C. eremosparti

Binomial name
- Coleophora eremosparti (Falkovitsh, 1974)

Synonyms
- Multicoloria eremosparti Falkovitsh, 1974

Species of moth

Coleophora eremosparti is a moth of the family Coleophoridae. It is found in Turkmenistan and southern Russia.

The larvae feed on Eremosparton flaccidum.
