= Coleophora necessaria =

Scientific classification
- Kingdom: Animalia
- Phylum: Arthropoda
- Class: Insecta
- Order: Lepidoptera
- Family: Coleophoridae
- Genus: Coleophora
- Species: C. necessaria

Binomial name
- Coleophora necessaria Staudinger, 1880

Synonyms
- Argyractinia indiges Falkovitsh, 1992

Species of moth

Coleophora necessaria is a moth of the family Coleophoridae. It is found in southern Russia and Turkey.

The larvae feed on Alyssum turkestanicum. They feed on the leaves and later the fruits of their host plant.
