= Coleophora talynella =

Scientific classification
- Kingdom: Animalia
- Phylum: Arthropoda
- Class: Insecta
- Order: Lepidoptera
- Family: Coleophoridae
- Genus: Coleophora
- Species: C. talynella

Binomial name
- Coleophora talynella Reznik, 1975

Species of moth

Coleophora talynella is a moth of the family Coleophoridae that occurs in Mongolia.
