= Coleophora lunensis =

Scientific classification
- Kingdom: Animalia
- Phylum: Arthropoda
- Class: Insecta
- Order: Lepidoptera
- Family: Coleophoridae
- Genus: Coleophora
- Species: C. lunensis

Binomial name
- Coleophora lunensis Falkovitsh, 1975

Synonyms
- Ecebalia lunensis

Species of moth

Coleophora lunensis is a moth of the family Coleophoridae. It is found in Mongolia and the Lower Volga region of southern Russia.

Adults are on wing in August.
