= Dichomeris bulawskii =

Scientific classification
- Kingdom: Animalia
- Phylum: Arthropoda
- Class: Insecta
- Order: Lepidoptera
- Family: Gelechiidae
- Genus: Dichomeris
- Species: D. bulawskii

Binomial name
- Dichomeris bulawskii Ponomarenko & Park, 1996

Species of moth

Dichomeris bulawskii is a moth in the family Gelechiidae. It was described by Ponomarenko and Park in 1996. It is found in south-eastern Siberia.

The wingspan is 19–20 mm (0.75–0.79 in).

== Etymology ==
The species is named for Alexander Bulawsky.
