= Coleophora physophorae =

Scientific classification
- Kingdom: Animalia
- Phylum: Arthropoda
- Class: Insecta
- Order: Lepidoptera
- Family: Coleophoridae
- Genus: Coleophora
- Species: C. physophorae

Binomial name
- Coleophora physophorae (Falkovitsh, 1994)

Synonyms
- Aporiptura physophorae Falkovitsh, 1994; Aporiptura physophora

Species of moth

Coleophora physophorae is a moth of the family Coleophoridae. It is found in southern Russia and central Asia. It occurs in desert-steppe biotopes.

Adults are on wing from late April to May.

The larvae feed on the carpels of Suaeda physophora.
