= Coleophora hypoxantha =

Scientific classification
- Kingdom: Animalia
- Phylum: Arthropoda
- Class: Insecta
- Order: Lepidoptera
- Family: Coleophoridae
- Genus: Coleophora
- Species: C. hypoxantha

Binomial name
- Coleophora hypoxantha (Falkovitsh, 1982)

Synonyms
- Aporiptura hypoxantha Falkovitsh, 1982

Species of moth

Coleophora hypoxantha is a moth of the family Coleophoridae. It is found in southern Russia.

The larvae feed on the leaves of Kalidium foliatum.
