= Coleophora tuvensis =

Scientific classification
- Kingdom: Animalia
- Phylum: Arthropoda
- Class: Insecta
- Order: Lepidoptera
- Family: Coleophoridae
- Genus: Coleophora
- Species: C. tuvensis

Binomial name
- Coleophora tuvensis (Reznik, 1977)

Synonyms
- Multicoloria tuvensis Reznik, 1977

Species of moth

Coleophora tuvensis is a moth of the family Coleophoridae. It is found in the Tuva Republic in Russia.
