= Coleophora samarensis =

Scientific classification
- Kingdom: Animalia
- Phylum: Arthropoda
- Class: Insecta
- Order: Lepidoptera
- Family: Coleophoridae
- Genus: Coleophora
- Species: C. samarensis

Binomial name
- Coleophora samarensis (Anikin, 2001)

Synonyms
- Eupista samarensis Anikin, 2001

Species of moth

Coleophora samarensis is a moth of the family Coleophoridae. It is found in southern Russia.
