= Ethmia ultima =

Scientific classification
- Kingdom: Animalia
- Phylum: Arthropoda
- Class: Insecta
- Order: Lepidoptera
- Family: Depressariidae
- Genus: Ethmia
- Species: E. ultima

Binomial name
- Ethmia ultima Sattler, 1967

Species of moth

Ethmia ultima is a moth in the family Depressariidae. It is found in China, Mongolia and Russia (Tuva, Transbaikal).

In Mongolia, adults have been recorded in mid- and late June and in Tuva in mid-May.
