= Coleophora lativittella =

Scientific classification
- Kingdom: Animalia
- Phylum: Arthropoda
- Class: Insecta
- Order: Lepidoptera
- Family: Coleophoridae
- Genus: Coleophora
- Species: C. lativittella

Binomial name
- Coleophora lativittella Erschoff, 1877

Species of moth

Coleophora lativittella is a moth of the family Coleophoridae. It is found in Irkutsk, Russia.
