= Coleophora kargani =

Scientific classification
- Kingdom: Animalia
- Phylum: Arthropoda
- Class: Insecta
- Order: Lepidoptera
- Family: Coleophoridae
- Genus: Coleophora
- Species: C. kargani

Binomial name
- Coleophora kargani (Falkovitsh, 1989)

Synonyms
- Aureliania kargani Falkovitsh, 1989; Ecebalia kargani

Species of moth

Coleophora kargani is a moth of the family Coleophoridae. It is found in southern Russia and central Asia. It occurs in semi-desert biotopes.

Adults are on wing from June to July.

The larvae feed on Caroxylon dendroides and possibly Kochia prostrata. They feed on the generative organs of their host plant.
