= Coleophora lacera =

Scientific classification
- Kingdom: Animalia
- Phylum: Arthropoda
- Class: Insecta
- Order: Lepidoptera
- Family: Coleophoridae
- Genus: Coleophora
- Species: C. lacera

Binomial name
- Coleophora lacera (Falkovitsh, 1993)

Synonyms
- Apista lacera Falkovitsh, 1993

Species of moth

Coleophora lacera is a moth of the family Coleophoridae. It is found in southern Russia.
