= Coleophora bagorella =

Scientific classification
- Kingdom: Animalia
- Phylum: Arthropoda
- Class: Insecta
- Order: Lepidoptera
- Family: Coleophoridae
- Genus: Coleophora
- Species: C. bagorella

Binomial name
- Coleophora bagorella Falkovitsh, 1977

Synonyms
- Hamuliella capusiella Nemes, 2003

Species of moth

Coleophora bagorella is a moth of the family Coleophoridae. It is found in Romania, Russia (Volga region), Turkey, Mongolia and China.
