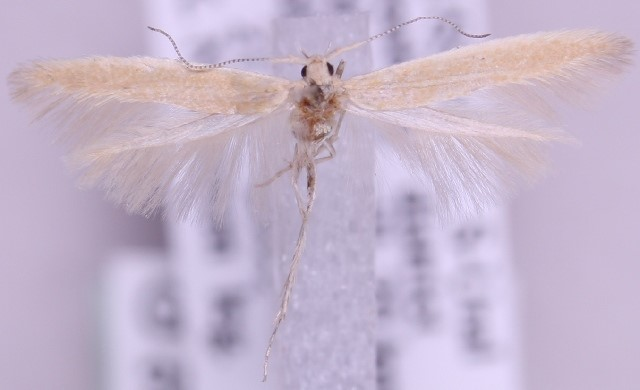

Scientific classification
- Kingdom: Animalia
- Phylum: Arthropoda
- Class: Insecta
- Order: Lepidoptera
- Family: Coleophoridae
- Genus: Coleophora
- Species: C. acerosa

Binomial name
- Coleophora acerosa (Falkovitsh, 1989)

Synonyms
- Ionescumia acerosa Falkovitsh, 1989

= Coleophora acerosa =

Species of moth

Coleophora acerosa is a moth of the family Coleophoridae. It is found in southern Russia, Astrakhan, Kazakhstan and Uzbekistan.

The larvae feed on Horaninovia ulicina.
