= Cosmopterix geminella =

Scientific classification
- Kingdom: Animalia
- Phylum: Arthropoda
- Clade: Pancrustacea
- Class: Insecta
- Order: Lepidoptera
- Family: Cosmopterigidae
- Genus: Cosmopterix
- Species: C. geminella

Binomial name
- Cosmopterix geminella Sinev, 1985

Species of moth

Cosmopterix geminella is a moth of the family Cosmopterigidae. It is known from Russia (Amur and Primorye regions).
