= Coleophora asperginella =

Scientific classification
- Kingdom: Animalia
- Phylum: Arthropoda
- Class: Insecta
- Order: Lepidoptera
- Family: Coleophoridae
- Genus: Coleophora
- Species: C. asperginella

Binomial name
- Coleophora asperginella Christoph, 1872

Species of moth

Coleophora asperginella is a moth of the family Coleophoridae. It is found in Turkestan and southern Russia. It occurs in desert biotopes.

Adults are on wing in August.

The larvae feed on Climacopiera species and Corispermum aralo-caspicum. Larvae can be found from May to June.
