= Ethmia zaguljaevi =

Scientific classification
- Domain: Eukaryota
- Kingdom: Animalia
- Phylum: Arthropoda
- Class: Insecta
- Order: Lepidoptera
- Family: Depressariidae
- Genus: Ethmia
- Species: E. zaguljaevi

Binomial name
- Ethmia zaguljaevi Kostjuk, 1980

Species of moth

Ethmia zaguljaevi is a moth in the family Depressariidae. It is found Altai in the Russian Far East.
