= Odites notocapna =

Scientific classification
- Kingdom: Animalia
- Phylum: Arthropoda
- Class: Insecta
- Order: Lepidoptera
- Family: Depressariidae
- Genus: Odites
- Species: O. notocapna

Binomial name
- Odites notocapna Meyrick, 1925

Synonyms
- Depressaria ussuriella Caradja, 1920; Exaeretia ussuriella

Species of moth

Odites notocapna is a moth in the family Depressariidae. It was described by Edward Meyrick in 1925. It is found in China and Russia (south-eastern Siberia).
