= Scrobipalpa frugifera =

Scientific classification
- Kingdom: Animalia
- Phylum: Arthropoda
- Clade: Pancrustacea
- Class: Insecta
- Order: Lepidoptera
- Family: Gelechiidae
- Genus: Scrobipalpa
- Species: S. frugifera

Binomial name
- Scrobipalpa frugifera Povolný, 1969

Synonyms
- Scrobipalpa hypothetica Povolný, 1973

Species of moth

Scrobipalpa frugifera is a moth in the family Gelechiidae. It was described by Povolný in 1969. It is found in Mongolia and southern Siberia.
