= Dichomeris litoxyla =

Scientific classification
- Kingdom: Animalia
- Phylum: Arthropoda
- Class: Insecta
- Order: Lepidoptera
- Family: Gelechiidae
- Genus: Dichomeris
- Species: D. litoxyla

Binomial name
- Dichomeris litoxyla Meyrick, 1937

Species of moth

Dichomeris litoxyla is a moth in the family Gelechiidae. It was described by Edward Meyrick in 1937. It is found in Transbaikalia, south-eastern Siberia and Korea.

The length of the forewings is 11.5–12.5 mm (0.45–0.49 in).
