= Coleophora moronella =

Scientific classification
- Kingdom: Animalia
- Phylum: Arthropoda
- Clade: Pancrustacea
- Class: Insecta
- Order: Lepidoptera
- Family: Coleophoridae
- Genus: Coleophora
- Species: C. moronella

Binomial name
- Coleophora moronella Falkovitsh, 1975

Species of moth

Coleophora moronella is a species of moth in the family Coleophoridae, which is found in Mongolia.
