= Dichomeris cuspis =

Scientific classification
- Kingdom: Animalia
- Phylum: Arthropoda
- Clade: Pancrustacea
- Class: Insecta
- Order: Lepidoptera
- Family: Gelechiidae
- Genus: Dichomeris
- Species: D. cuspis

Binomial name
- Dichomeris cuspis Park, 1994

Species of moth

Dichomeris cuspis is a moth in the family Gelechiidae. It was described by Kyu-Tek Park in 1994. It is found in south-eastern Siberia, Korea and Shaanxi, China.

The length of the forewings is 7.2-7.7 mm.

The larvae feed on Quercus acuteserrata.
