= Coleophora arta =

Scientific classification
- Kingdom: Animalia
- Phylum: Arthropoda
- Class: Insecta
- Order: Lepidoptera
- Family: Coleophoridae
- Genus: Coleophora
- Species: C. arta

Binomial name
- Coleophora arta Falkovitsh, 1979

Species of moth

Coleophora arta is a moth of the family Coleophoridae that can be found in China and Mongolia.
