= Dichomeris polypunctata =

Scientific classification
- Kingdom: Animalia
- Phylum: Arthropoda
- Clade: Pancrustacea
- Class: Insecta
- Order: Lepidoptera
- Family: Gelechiidae
- Genus: Dichomeris
- Species: D. polypunctata

Binomial name
- Dichomeris polypunctata Park, 1994

Synonyms
- Dichomeris polystigma Park, 1994

Species of moth

Dichomeris polypunctata is a moth in the family Gelechiidae. It was described by Kyu-Tek Park in 1994. It is found in south-eastern Siberia, Korea and Mongolia.

The length of the forewings is about 10.5 mm.
