= Ethmia turkmeniella =

Scientific classification
- Kingdom: Animalia
- Phylum: Arthropoda
- Clade: Pancrustacea
- Class: Insecta
- Order: Lepidoptera
- Family: Depressariidae
- Genus: Ethmia
- Species: E. turkmeniella

Binomial name
- Ethmia turkmeniella Dubatolov & Ustjuzhanin, 1998

Species of moth

Ethmia turkmeniella is a moth in the family Depressariidae. It is found in Turkmenistan and Kalmykia, Russia.
