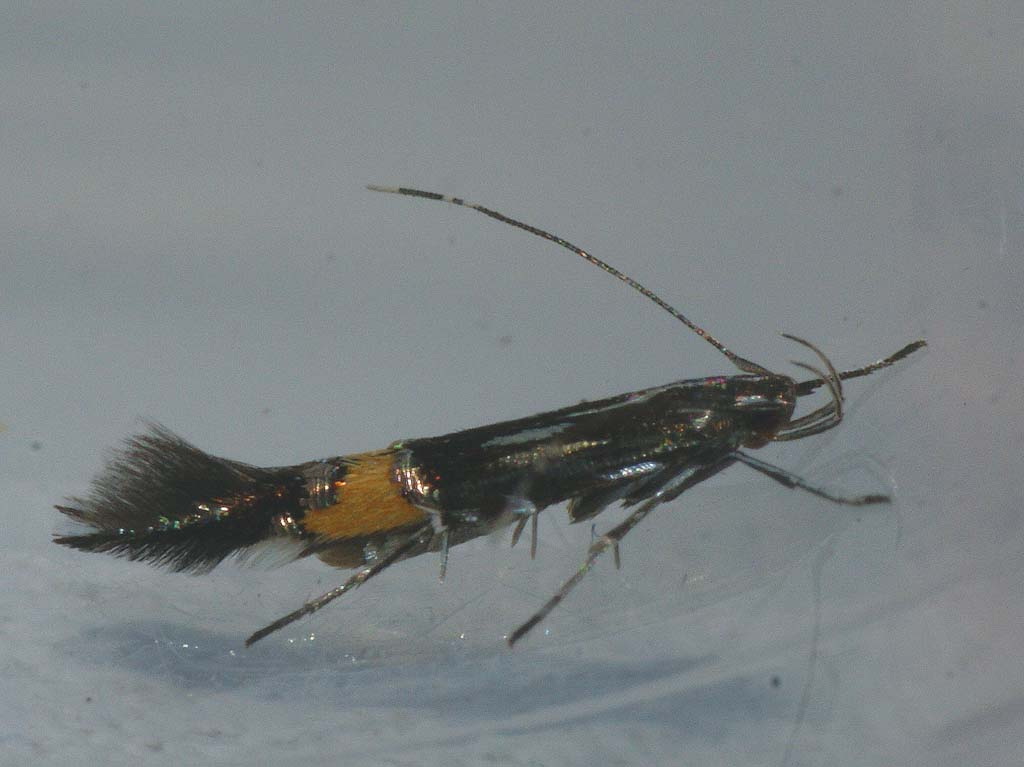

Scientific classification
- Kingdom: Animalia
- Phylum: Arthropoda
- Clade: Pancrustacea
- Class: Insecta
- Order: Lepidoptera
- Family: Cosmopterigidae
- Genus: Cosmopterix
- Species: C. sibirica

Binomial name
- Cosmopterix sibirica Sinev, 1985

= Cosmopterix sibirica =

Species of moth

Cosmopterix sibirica is a moth of the family Cosmopterigidae. It is known from the South Siberian Mountains, Mongolia and Finland.

The wingspan is 11–13 mm. Adults have been recorded in July.
