= Coleophora hemerobiola =

Scientific classification
- Kingdom: Animalia
- Phylum: Arthropoda
- Class: Insecta
- Order: Lepidoptera
- Family: Coleophoridae
- Genus: Coleophora
- Species: C. hemerobiola

Binomial name
- Coleophora hemerobiola Filipjev, 1926

Species of moth

Coleophora hemerobiola is a moth of the family Coleophoridae. It is found in Turkestan.

The larvae feed on Malus, Pyrus, Crataegus and Prunus species. They feed on the leaves of their host plant.
