= Coleophora inconstans =

Scientific classification
- Kingdom: Animalia
- Phylum: Arthropoda
- Class: Insecta
- Order: Lepidoptera
- Family: Coleophoridae
- Genus: Coleophora
- Species: C. inconstans

Binomial name
- Coleophora inconstans Reznik, 1975

Species of moth

Coleophora inconstans is a moth of the family Coleophoridae. It is found in Mongolia and southern Russia.

The larvae feed on the leaves of Artemisia terrae-albae.
