= Coleophora diplodon =

Scientific classification
- Kingdom: Animalia
- Phylum: Arthropoda
- Class: Insecta
- Order: Lepidoptera
- Family: Coleophoridae
- Genus: Coleophora
- Species: C. diplodon

Binomial name
- Coleophora diplodon Falkovitsh, 1993

Species of moth

Coleophora diplodon is a moth of the family Coleophoridae. It is found in Russia.
