= Coleophora microdon =

Scientific classification
- Kingdom: Animalia
- Phylum: Arthropoda
- Class: Insecta
- Order: Lepidoptera
- Family: Coleophoridae
- Genus: Coleophora
- Species: C. microdon

Binomial name
- Coleophora microdon (Falkovitsh, 1993)

Synonyms
- Casignetella microdon Falkovitsh, 1993

Species of moth

Coleophora microdon is a moth of the family Coleophoridae.
