= Coleophora subgilva =

Scientific classification
- Kingdom: Animalia
- Phylum: Arthropoda
- Class: Insecta
- Order: Lepidoptera
- Family: Coleophoridae
- Genus: Coleophora
- Species: C. subgilva

Binomial name
- Coleophora subgilva (Falkovitsh, 1991)

Synonyms
- Ionescumia subgilva Falkovitsh, 1991

Species of moth

Coleophora subgilva is a moth of the family Coleophoridae that is endemic to Kazakhstan.

The larvae feed on Anabasis species.
