= Coleophora balkara =

Scientific classification
- Kingdom: Animalia
- Phylum: Arthropoda
- Class: Insecta
- Order: Lepidoptera
- Family: Coleophoridae
- Genus: Coleophora
- Species: C. balkara

Binomial name
- Coleophora balkara (Falkovitsh & Jalava, 1997)

Synonyms
- Amselghia balkara Falkovitsh & Jalava, 1997

Species of moth

Coleophora balkara is a moth of the family Coleophoridae. It is found in Russia (northern Caucasus).
