= Coleophora koreana =

Scientific classification
- Kingdom: Animalia
- Phylum: Arthropoda
- Clade: Pancrustacea
- Class: Insecta
- Order: Lepidoptera
- Family: Coleophoridae
- Genus: Coleophora
- Species: C. koreana

Binomial name
- Coleophora koreana Baldizzone, 1989

Species of moth

Coleophora koreana is a moth of the family Coleophoridae. It is found in Korea.

The wingspan is about 11 mm.
