= Coleophora glycyrrhizae =

Scientific classification
- Kingdom: Animalia
- Phylum: Arthropoda
- Class: Insecta
- Order: Lepidoptera
- Family: Coleophoridae
- Genus: Coleophora
- Species: C. glycyrrhizae

Binomial name
- Coleophora glycyrrhizae Falkovitsh, 1989

Species of moth

Coleophora glycyrrhizae is a moth of the family Coleophoridae. It is found in Kazakhstan.

The larvae have been observed to eat Glycyrrhiza glabra and Meristotropis triphylla. They feed on the leaves of their host plant.
