= Cosmopterix asignella =

Scientific classification
- Kingdom: Animalia
- Phylum: Arthropoda
- Clade: Pancrustacea
- Class: Insecta
- Order: Lepidoptera
- Family: Cosmopterigidae
- Genus: Cosmopterix
- Species: C. asignella

Binomial name
- Cosmopterix asignella Sinev, 1988

Species of moth from Russia

Cosmopterix asignella is a moth in the family Cosmopterigidae. It was described by Sinev in 1988. It is found in the Russian Far East (Primorye).
