= Coleophora pilion =

Scientific classification
- Kingdom: Animalia
- Phylum: Arthropoda
- Class: Insecta
- Order: Lepidoptera
- Family: Coleophoridae
- Genus: Coleophora
- Species: C. pilion

Binomial name
- Coleophora pilion (Falkovitsh, 1992)

Synonyms
- Casignetella pilion Falkovitsh, 1992

Species of moth

Coleophora pilion is a moth of the family Coleophoridae. It is found in southern Russia.

The larvae feed on the leaves of Artemisia turanica.
