= Coleophora drymophila =

Scientific classification
- Kingdom: Animalia
- Phylum: Arthropoda
- Class: Insecta
- Order: Lepidoptera
- Family: Coleophoridae
- Genus: Coleophora
- Species: C. drymophila

Binomial name
- Coleophora drymophila (Falkovitsh, 1991)

Synonyms
- Haploptilia drymophila Falkovitsh, 1991

Species of moth

Coleophora drymophila is a moth of the family Coleophoridae. It is found in Georgia and Azerbaijan.

The larvae feed on Carpinus and Alnus species. They feed on the leaves of their host plant.
