= Coleophora stachi =

Scientific classification
- Kingdom: Animalia
- Phylum: Arthropoda
- Class: Insecta
- Order: Lepidoptera
- Family: Coleophoridae
- Genus: Coleophora
- Species: C. stachi

Binomial name
- Coleophora stachi Toll, 1957

Species of moth

Coleophora stachi is a moth of the family Coleophoridae that is endemic to southern Russia, including Russian Far East and Lower Volga.
