= Coleophora dissecta =

Scientific classification
- Kingdom: Animalia
- Phylum: Arthropoda
- Class: Insecta
- Order: Lepidoptera
- Family: Coleophoridae
- Genus: Coleophora
- Species: C. dissecta

Binomial name
- Coleophora dissecta (Falkovitsh, 1989)

Synonyms
- Aporiptura dissecta Falkovitsh, 1989

Species of moth

Coleophora dissecta is a moth of the family Coleophoridae. It is found in southern Russia and central Asia. It occurs in desert-steppe and desert biotopes.

Adults are on wing in early September.

The larvae feed on the carpels of Halocnemum strobiloceum.
