= Coleophora ancistron =

Scientific classification
- Kingdom: Animalia
- Phylum: Arthropoda
- Class: Insecta
- Order: Lepidoptera
- Family: Coleophoridae
- Genus: Coleophora
- Species: C. ancistron

Binomial name
- Coleophora ancistron Falkovitsh, 1976

Synonyms
- Casignetella ancistron

Species of moth

Coleophora ancistron is a moth of the family Coleophoridae. It is found in southern Russia, central Asia and Mongolia.

Adults are on wing in May and August.
