= Coleophora morosa =

Scientific classification
- Kingdom: Animalia
- Phylum: Arthropoda
- Class: Insecta
- Order: Lepidoptera
- Family: Coleophoridae
- Genus: Coleophora
- Species: C. morosa

Binomial name
- Coleophora morosa (Falkovitsh, 1993)

Synonyms
- Casignetella morosa Falkovitsh, 1993

Species of moth

Coleophora morosa is a moth of the family Coleophoridae, and a member of the order Lepidoptera. It is found in eastern Siberia.

== Appearance ==
C. morosa has long tan wings and antennae. It has three long legs on each side of its body. It has stripes going down its wings, however they are not very prominent.
