= Coleophora tshiligella =

Scientific classification
- Kingdom: Animalia
- Phylum: Arthropoda
- Class: Insecta
- Order: Lepidoptera
- Family: Coleophoridae
- Genus: Coleophora
- Species: C. tshiligella

Binomial name
- Coleophora tshiligella (Reznik, 1976)

Synonyms
- Multicoloria tshiligella Reznik, 1976

Species of moth

Coleophora tshiligella is a moth of the family Coleophoridae. It is found in southern Russia.
