= Coleophora immersa =

Scientific classification
- Kingdom: Animalia
- Phylum: Arthropoda
- Class: Insecta
- Order: Lepidoptera
- Family: Coleophoridae
- Genus: Coleophora
- Species: C. immersa

Binomial name
- Coleophora immersa (Falkovitsh, 1989)

Synonyms
- Aureliana immersa Falkovitsh, 1989

Species of moth

Coleophora immersa is a moth of the family Coleophoridae. It is found in southern Russia.

The larvae feed on Kalidium foliatum. They feed on the generative organs of their host plant.
