= Coleophora erratella =

Scientific classification
- Kingdom: Animalia
- Phylum: Arthropoda
- Class: Insecta
- Order: Lepidoptera
- Family: Coleophoridae
- Genus: Coleophora
- Species: C. erratella

Binomial name
- Coleophora erratella Toll & Amsel, 1967

Species of moth

Coleophora erratella is a moth of the family Coleophoridae. It is found in southern Russia and Afghanistan.

The larvae feed on the leaves of Artemisia species, including A. kopetdaghensis, A. badhysi and A. turanica.
