= Coleophora pustulosa =

Scientific classification
- Kingdom: Animalia
- Phylum: Arthropoda
- Class: Insecta
- Order: Lepidoptera
- Family: Coleophoridae
- Genus: Coleophora
- Species: C. pustulosa

Binomial name
- Coleophora pustulosa Falkovitsh, 1979

Species of moth

Coleophora pustulosa is a moth of the family Coleophoridae. It is found in Siberia and Mongolia.

The length of the forewings is about 6 millimetres (0.24 in). Adults are on wing in July and August.
