= Coleophora ammophora =

Scientific classification
- Kingdom: Animalia
- Phylum: Arthropoda
- Class: Insecta
- Order: Lepidoptera
- Family: Coleophoridae
- Genus: Coleophora
- Species: C. ammophora

Binomial name
- Coleophora ammophora Falkovitsh, 1989

Species of moth

Coleophora ammophora is a moth of the family Coleophoridae. It is found in Turkey.

The larvae feed on Artemisia badhysi. They feed on the leaves of their host plant.
