= Coleophora loxodon =

Scientific classification
- Kingdom: Animalia
- Phylum: Arthropoda
- Class: Insecta
- Order: Lepidoptera
- Family: Coleophoridae
- Genus: Coleophora
- Species: C. loxodon

Binomial name
- Coleophora loxodon (Falkovitsh, 1993)

Synonyms
- Casignetella loxodon Falkovitsh, 1993

Species of moth

Coleophora loxodon is a moth of the family Coleophoridae. It is found in the Crimean Peninsula.
