= Coleophora nanophyti =

Scientific classification
- Kingdom: Animalia
- Phylum: Arthropoda
- Class: Insecta
- Order: Lepidoptera
- Family: Coleophoridae
- Genus: Coleophora
- Species: C. nanophyti

Binomial name
- Coleophora nanophyti Falkovitsh, 1972

Species of moth

Coleophora nanophyti is a moth of the family Coleophoridae. It is found in southern Russia, Turkestan and Uzbekistan.

The larvae feed on Nanophyton erinaceum. The larvae can be found from September to October.
