= Coleophora kolymella =

Scientific classification
- Kingdom: Animalia
- Phylum: Arthropoda
- Class: Insecta
- Order: Lepidoptera
- Family: Coleophoridae
- Genus: Coleophora
- Species: C. kolymella

Binomial name
- Coleophora kolymella (Falkovitsh, 1992)

Synonyms
- Aureliania kolymella Falkovitsh, 1992

Species of moth

Coleophora kolymella is a moth of the family Coleophoridae. It is found in southern Russia.
