= Coleophora diogenes =

Scientific classification
- Kingdom: Animalia
- Phylum: Arthropoda
- Class: Insecta
- Order: Lepidoptera
- Family: Coleophoridae
- Genus: Coleophora
- Species: C. diogenes

Binomial name
- Coleophora diogenes Falkovitsh, 1970

Species of moth

Coleophora diogenes is a moth of the family Coleophoridae. It is found in southern Russia, Turkestan, Uzbekistan and China.
