= Kiwaia pharetria =

Scientific classification
- Kingdom: Animalia
- Phylum: Arthropoda
- Clade: Pancrustacea
- Class: Insecta
- Order: Lepidoptera
- Family: Gelechiidae
- Genus: Kiwaia
- Species: K. pharetria

Binomial name
- Kiwaia pharetria (Meyrick, 1885)

Synonyms
- Gelechia phaxetria Meyrick, 1885; Gelechia pharetria Meyrick, 1885

Species of moth endemic to New Zealand

Kiwaia pharetria is a species of moth in the family Gelechiidae. It was first described by Edward Meyrick in 1885. It is endemic to New Zealand and is found in the South Island in the West Coast, Canterbury and Otago regions. This species frequents grassland and flowering herbage habitat. Larvae feed on species in the genus Carmichaelia. A specific larval host is Carmichaelia compacta and probably also Carmichaelia petriei. Adults are day flying and are commonly on the wing in November, December and January.

== Taxonomy ==
This species was first described by Edward Meyrick in 1885 and named as Gelechia phaxetria. In 1886 Meyrick gave a fuller description using the name Gelechia pharetria. George Hudson discussed and illustrated this species under that latter name in his 1928 book The butterflies and moths of New Zealand. In 1987 Klaus Slattler placed this species in the genus Kiwaia. In 1988 John S. Dugdale agreed with this placement. The male lectotype, collected by Meyrick at Arthur's Pass, is held at the Natural History Museum, London.

== Description ==
Illustration of female.

Illustration of male.

Meyrick described this species as follows:

Male, female. — 13-17 mm. Head, palpi, thorax, abdomen, and legs, whitish-ochreous ; anterior legs infuscated. Antennae fuscous. Forewings elongate, narrow, acutely pointed ; whitish-ochreous, obscurely irrorated with brownish-ochreous, tending to form streaks on veins, sometimes a more distinct apical streak ; sometimes a few scattered black scales, also tending to accumulate on veins ; three small black discal spots, sometimes almost obsolete, first before middle, second on fold obliquely before first, third beyond middle ; apical portion of costa and hindmargin obscurely dotted with black : cilia whitish-ochreous, with two obscure interrupted lines of blackish points round apex. Hindwings with apex round-pointed, hindmargin gently sinuate ; whitish-grey ; cilia ochreous-whitish.

This species is similar in appearance to Kiwaia parapleura but differs as K. pharetria has brownish irroration, obscure lines on veins, and an absence of the dark fuscous median streak found in K. parapleura. The hindwings of K. pharetria are also somewhat less pointed.

== Distribution ==
This species is endemic to New Zealand. It has been observed in the West Coast, Canterbury, and Otago regions.

== Habitat and host ==
K. pharetria frequents grassland and flowering herbage habitat. Larvae feed on species in the genus Carmichaelia. A specific larval host is Carmichaelia compacta and probably also Carmichaelia petriei.

== Behaviour ==
Adults are day flying and are commonly on the wing in November, December and January.
