= Kiwaia kostjuki =

Scientific classification
- Kingdom: Animalia
- Phylum: Arthropoda
- Clade: Pancrustacea
- Class: Insecta
- Order: Lepidoptera
- Family: Gelechiidae
- Genus: Kiwaia
- Species: K. kostjuki

Binomial name
- Kiwaia kostjuki Povolný, 2001

Species of moth

Kiwaia kostjuki is a moth in the family Gelechiidae. It was described by Povolný in 2001. It is found in Russia.
