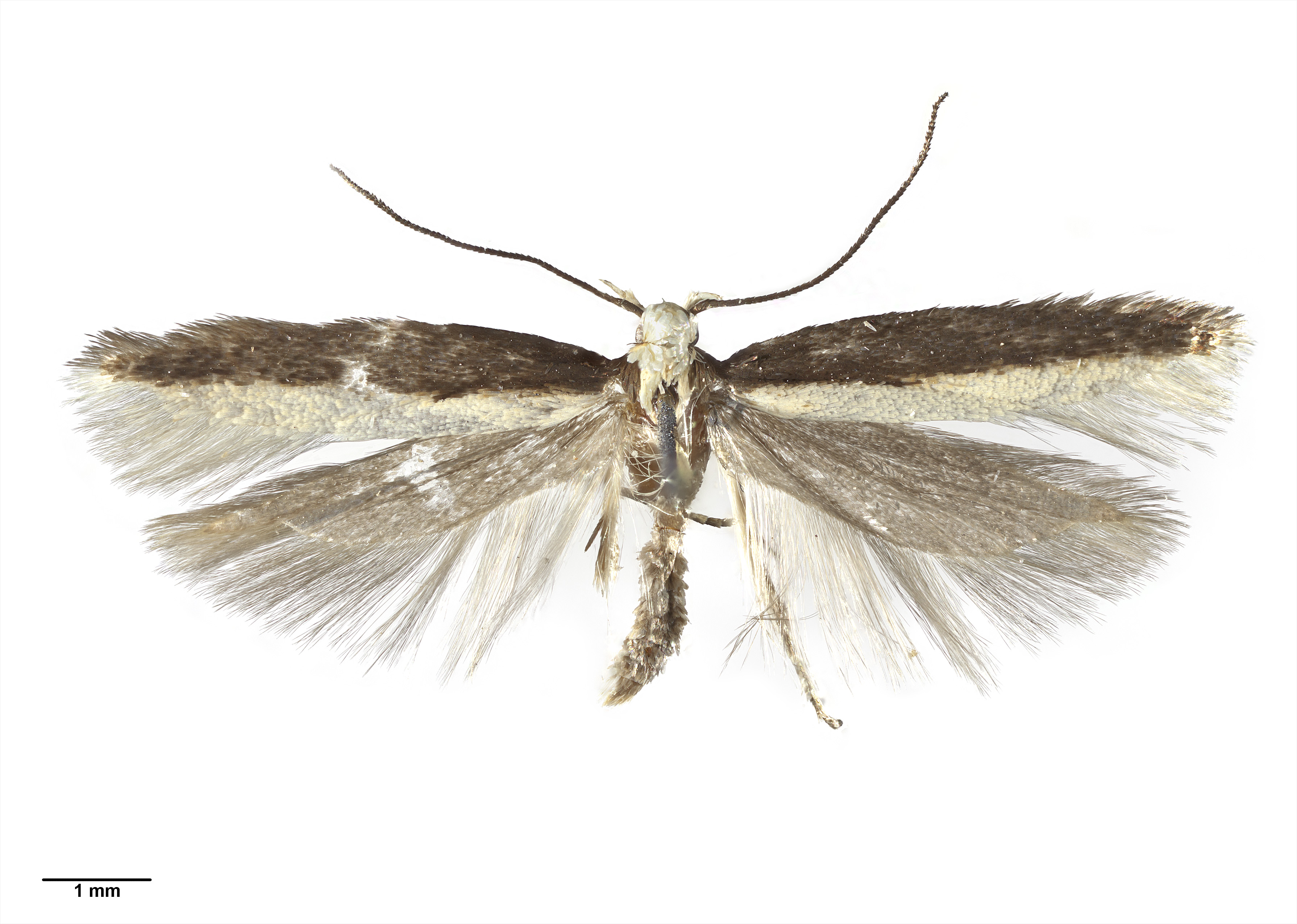

Scientific classification
- Domain: Eukaryota
- Kingdom: Animalia
- Phylum: Arthropoda
- Class: Insecta
- Order: Lepidoptera
- Family: Gelechiidae
- Genus: Kiwaia
- Species: K. parvula

Binomial name
- Kiwaia parvula (Philpott, 1930)

Synonyms
- Gelechia parvula Philpott, 1930

= Kiwaia parvula =

Species of moth

Kiwaia parvula is a moth in the family Gelechiidae. It was described by Philpott in 1930. It is found in New Zealand.
