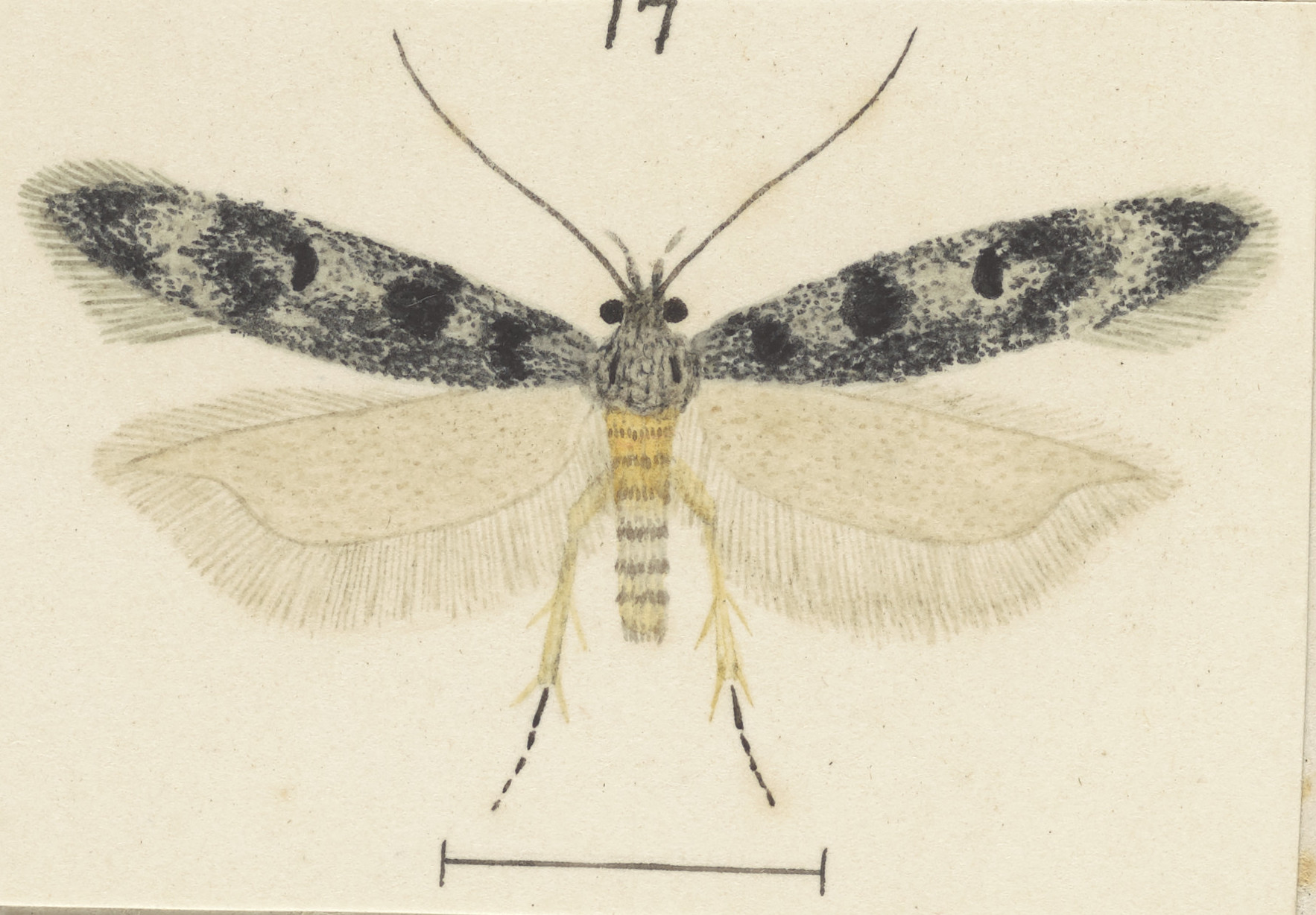

Scientific classification
- Domain: Eukaryota
- Kingdom: Animalia
- Phylum: Arthropoda
- Class: Insecta
- Order: Lepidoptera
- Family: Gelechiidae
- Genus: Kiwaia
- Species: K. lapillosa

Binomial name
- Kiwaia lapillosa (Meyrick, 1924)

Synonyms
- Gelechia lapillosa Meyrick, 1924

= Kiwaia lapillosa =

Species of moth

Kiwaia lapillosa is a moth in the family Gelechiidae. It was described by Edward Meyrick in 1924. It is found in New Zealand.

The wingspan is 15–16 mm. The forewings are dark slaty fuscous, irregularly sprinkled or mixed with whitish grey. The markings are cloudy, formed by absence of pale mixture. The stigmata are represented by spots, with the plical spot places obliquely before the first discal spot, a thick oblique bar from the costa terminating in these two spots, and an additional spot midway between the plical spot and the base. A grey-whitish, angulated, and more or less distinct transverse shade is present at three-fourths. The hindwings are light grey.
