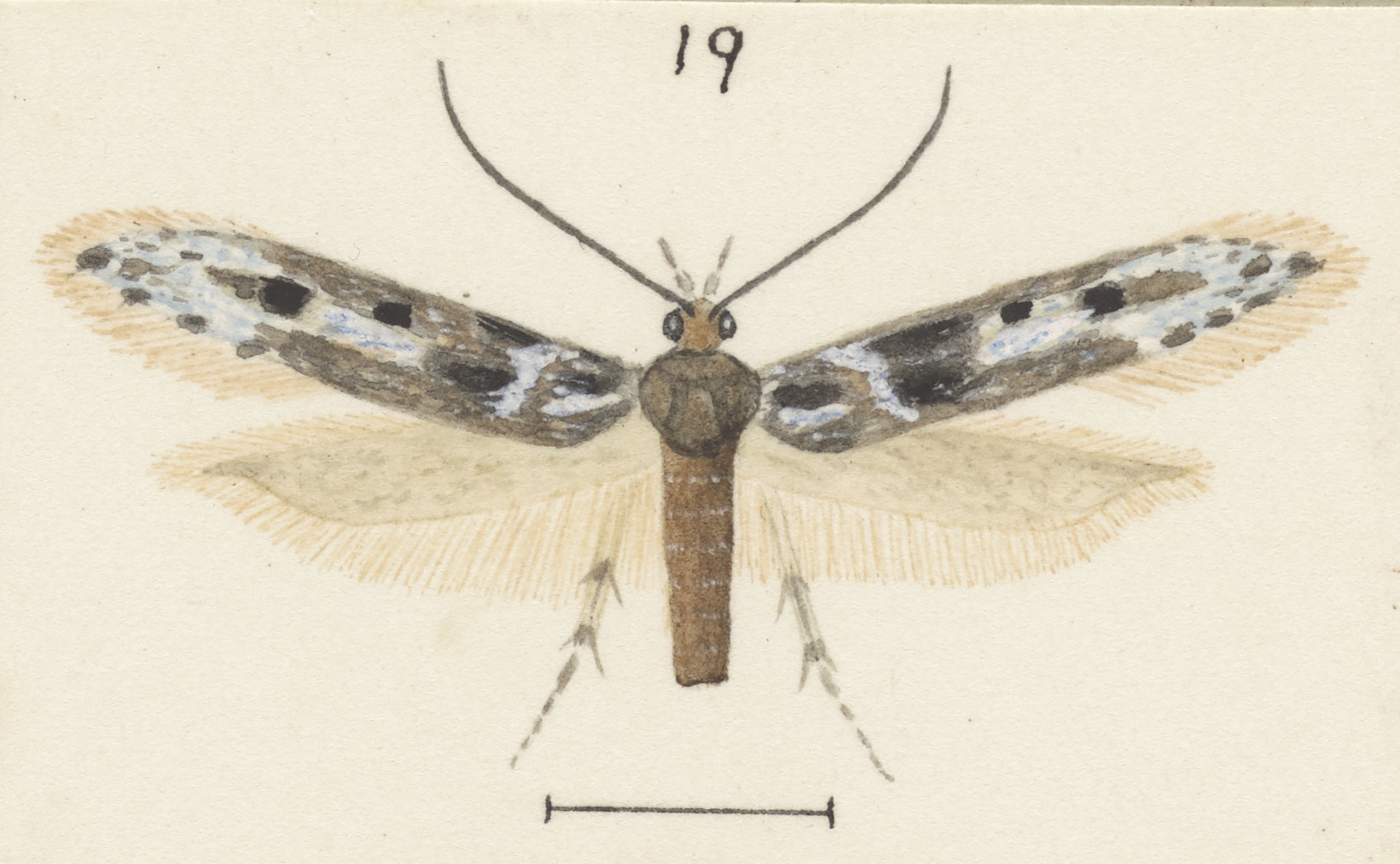

Scientific classification
- Domain: Eukaryota
- Kingdom: Animalia
- Phylum: Arthropoda
- Class: Insecta
- Order: Lepidoptera
- Family: Gelechiidae
- Genus: Kiwaia
- Species: K. glaucoterma

Binomial name
- Kiwaia glaucoterma (Meyrick, 1911)

Synonyms
- Gelechia glaucoterma Meyrick, 1911

= Kiwaia glaucoterma =

Species of moth

Kiwaia glaucoterma is a species of moth in the family Gelechiidae. It was described by Edward Meyrick in 1911. It is endemic to New Zealand.

== Taxonomy ==
This species was first described by Edward Meyrick in 1911 using two specimens collected by Alfred Philpott on coastal sandhills at Invercargill in January.

== Description ==
The wingspan of the male is 9–10 mm. The forewings are dark grey with an oblique bar of white suffusion from the costa at one-sixth, reaching half across the wing, accompanied with some whitish-ochreous scales, sometimes tending to extend along the costa to the base. There is an undefined patch of blackish suffusion in the disc beyond this, representing the first discal and plical stigmata, and a rather large roundish black spot representing the second discal, with more or less whitish irroration between these and on the margins of the second discal. There is also a white patch occupying the apical fourth, mixed with dark grey or dark fuscous towards the apex, the anterior edge irregularly indented in the middle. The hindwings are grey-whitish, with the apex greyer.
