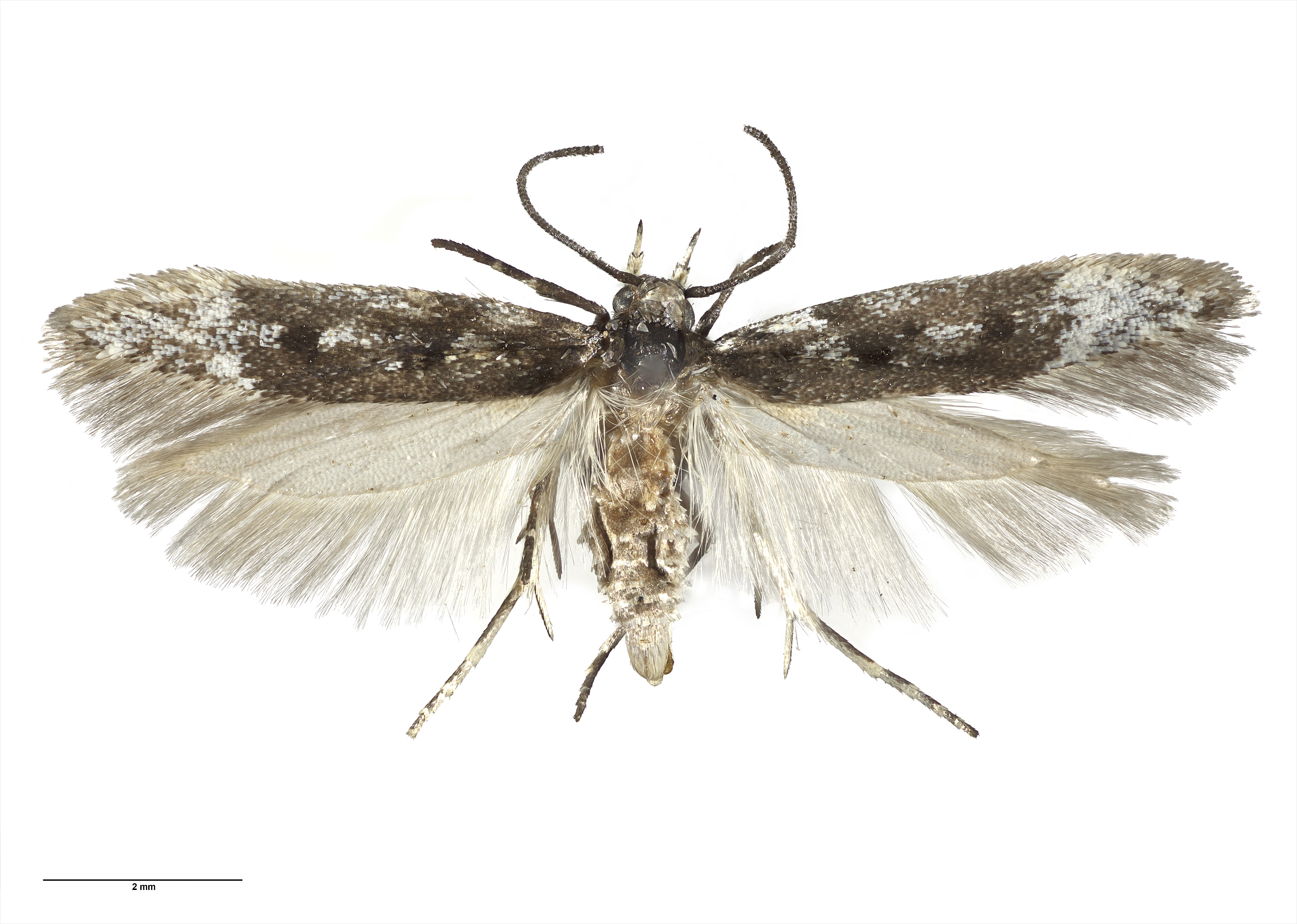

Conservation status
- Data Deficit (NZ TCS)

Scientific classification
- Kingdom: Animalia
- Phylum: Arthropoda
- Clade: Pancrustacea
- Class: Insecta
- Order: Lepidoptera
- Family: Gelechiidae
- Genus: Kiwaia
- Species: K. caerulea

Binomial name
- Kiwaia caerulea (Hudson, 1925)

Synonyms
- Gelechia caerulea Hudson, 1925; Kiwaia caerulaea (Hudson, 1925); Gelechia caerulaea (Hudson, 1925)

= Kiwaia caerulea =

Species of moth

Kiwaia caerulea is a moth in the family Gelechiidae. It was first described by George Hudson in 1925. It is endemic to New Zealand. In 2025 this species was classified as "data deficient" under the New Zealand Threat Classification System.

== Taxonomy ==
This species was first described by George Hudson in 1925 and named Gelechia caerulea. However, in 1928 Hudson, in his seminal work The butterflies and moths of New Zealand, discussed and illustrated this species and spelt the specific epithet caerulaea. This species was placed in the genus Kiwaia in 1988 and in that publication the epithet caerulea was used. However, John S. Dugdale in the 1988 catalogue of New Zealand Lepidoptera, used the epithet caerulaea. This latter spelling continues to be used by New Zealand publications and databases such as the New Zealand Inventory of Biodiversity and the New Zealand Organisms Register as well as organisations such as Te Papa, Auckland War Memorial Museum, the New Zealand Organisms Register and the New Zealand Arthropod collection. The male holotype specimen, collected in the Waiho Gorge by Charles E. Clarke, has not been located at Te Papa.

== Description ==
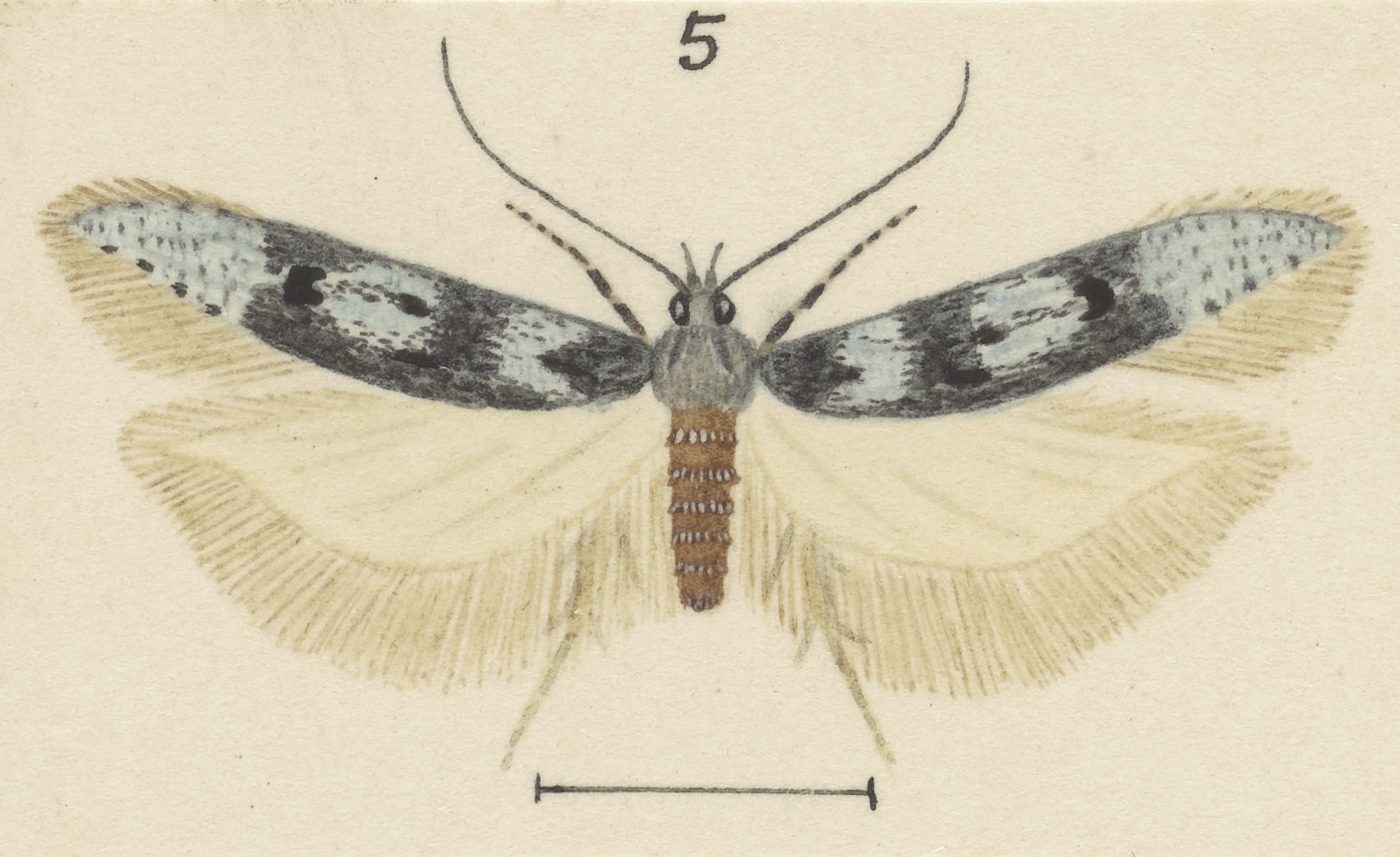
Hudson illustration of male.

Hudson described this species as follows:

The expansion of the wings is barely 1/2 inch. The fore-wings are pale blue with slaty-black markings; a broad oblique band at base; another oblique band before the middle, containing plical and first discal stigmata; a third considerably diffused band at 2/3, containing a large black discal spot; a longitudinal band along dorsum joining the above described transverse bands; the outer third of wing, which is pale blue, has a few scattered slaty-black scales, some forming indefinite dots along costa and termen. The hind-wings are very pale greyish-ochceous. All the cilia are greyish-ochreous. The palpi are dull white, with apex of terminal joint blackish. The head is pale greyish-blue, the thorax slaty-black and the abdomen greyish-brown, with apical tuft greyish-ochreous. The legs are greyish-ochreous barred with black.

== Distribution ==
This species is endemic to New Zealand.

== Conservation status ==
In 2025 this species was classified by the New Zealand Department of Conservation as "data deficient" under the New Zealand Threat Classification System.
