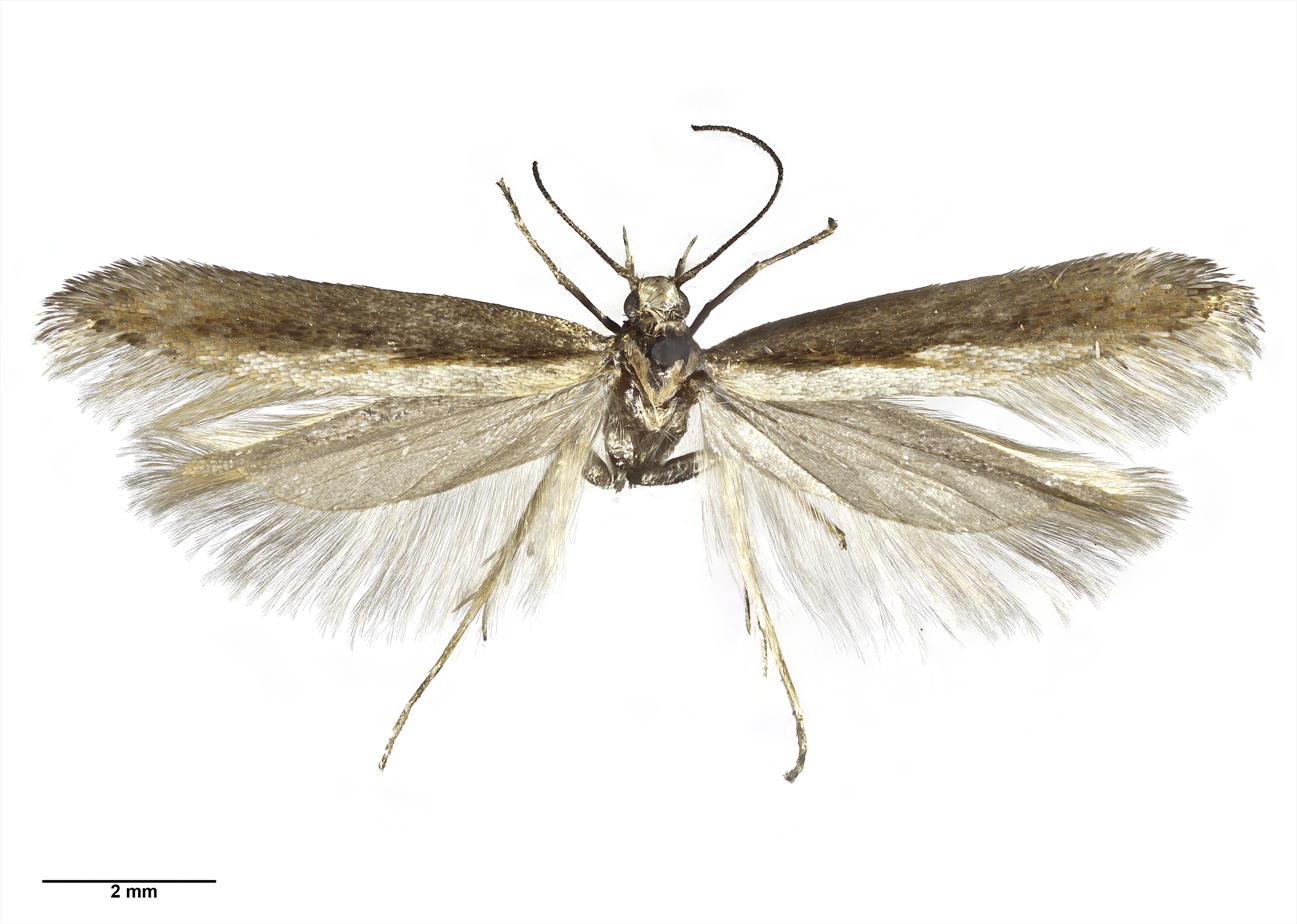
- Male holotype specimen held at the Auckland War Memorial Museum.

Scientific classification
- Domain: Eukaryota
- Kingdom: Animalia
- Phylum: Arthropoda
- Class: Insecta
- Order: Lepidoptera
- Family: Gelechiidae
- Genus: Kiwaia
- Species: K. contraria

Binomial name
- Kiwaia contraria (Philpott, 1930)

Synonyms
- Gelechia contraria Philpott, 1930

= Kiwaia contraria =

Species of moth

Kiwaia contraria is a moth in the family Gelechiidae. It was described by Alfred Philpott in 1930. It is found in New Zealand.
