= Kiwaia dividua =

Scientific classification
- Domain: Eukaryota
- Kingdom: Animalia
- Phylum: Arthropoda
- Class: Insecta
- Order: Lepidoptera
- Family: Gelechiidae
- Genus: Kiwaia
- Species: K. dividua

Binomial name
- Kiwaia dividua (Philpott, 1921)

Synonyms
- Gelechia dividua Philpott, 1921

Species of moth

Kiwaia dividua is a moth in the family Gelechiidae. It was described by Philpott in 1921. It is found in New Zealand.

The wingspan is 9–12 mm. The forewings are brownish-grey with a black central streak from the base to before half, attenuated apically, sometimes margined beneath with ochreous. There is a similar streak commencing slightly above and beyond the basal streak and continuing to apex, evenly widening from the acute base. The hindwings are shining grey-whitish.
