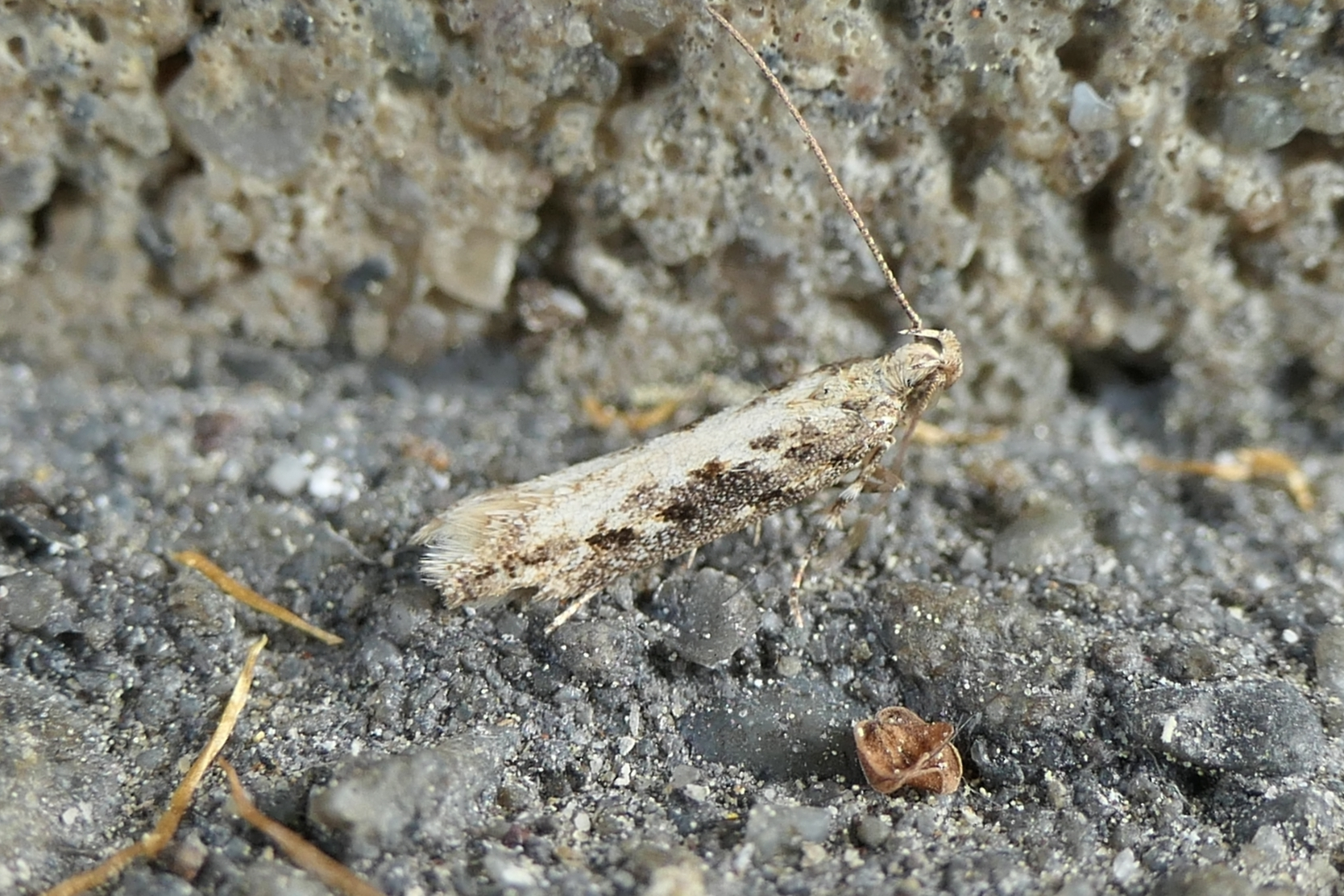

Scientific classification
- Domain: Eukaryota
- Kingdom: Animalia
- Phylum: Arthropoda
- Class: Insecta
- Order: Lepidoptera
- Family: Gelechiidae
- Genus: Kiwaia
- Species: K. brontophora

Binomial name
- Kiwaia brontophora (Meyrick, 1885)

Synonyms
- Gelechia brontophora Meyrick, 1885

= Kiwaia brontophora =

Species of moth

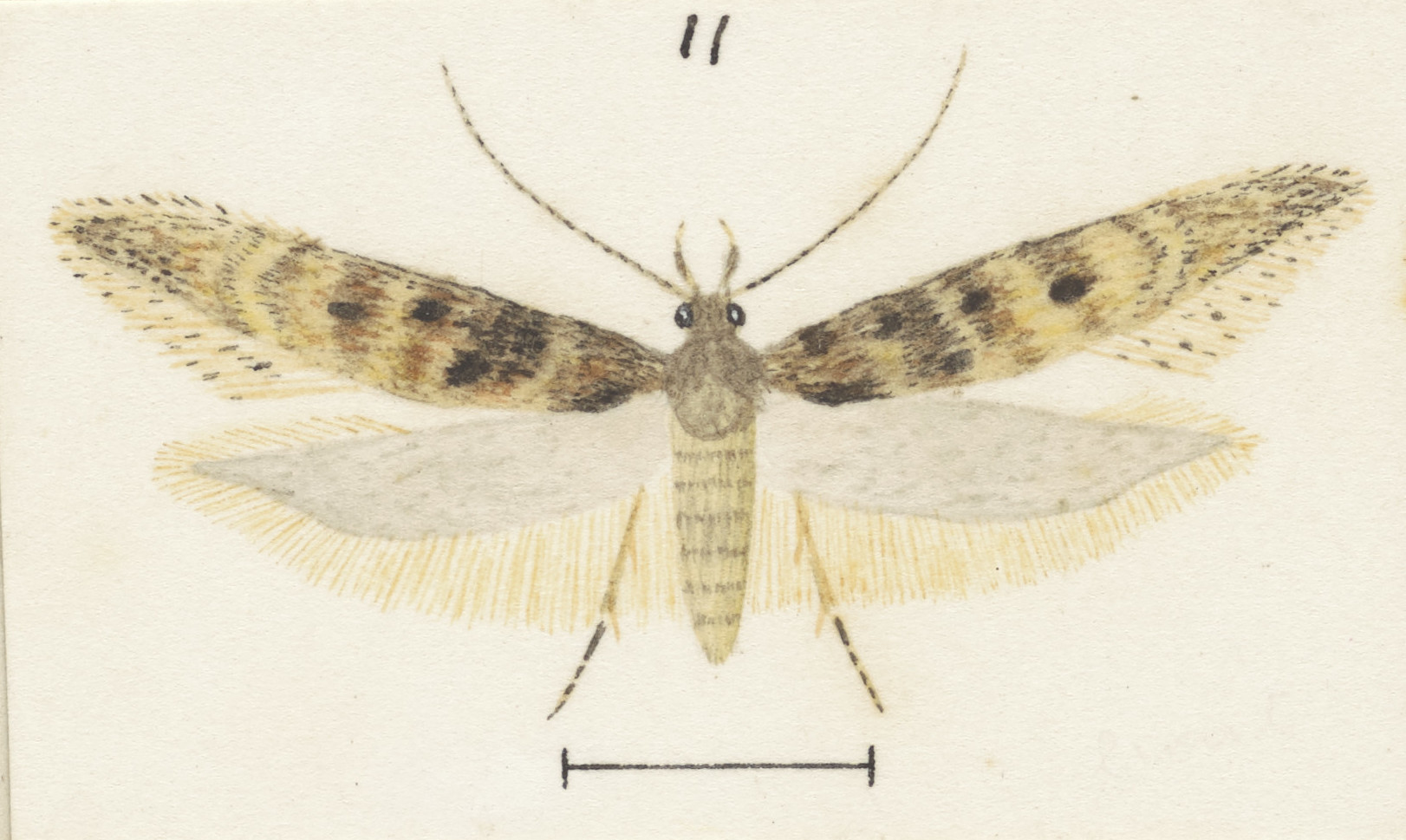
Watercolour by George Hudson c. 1927

Kiwaia brontophora is a species of moth in the family Gelechiidae. It was described by Edward Meyrick in 1885. It is found in New Zealand.

The wingspan is about 11 mm. The forewings are whitish ochreous, thinly irrorated (sprinkled) with brownish ochreous and with a dense black irroration covering the costal half of the wing to the fold from the base to the middle, except for an oblique irregular bar at one-fourth, posteriorly suffusedly attenuated to the costa at three-fourths. There are five irregular black discal spots, the first in the middle, the second obliquely before the first on the fold, confluent with the costal irroration, the third below the first, connected with it by a cloudy black irroration, the fourth larger, in the disc at two-thirds and the fifth beyond the fourth. The hindwings are whitish grey.
