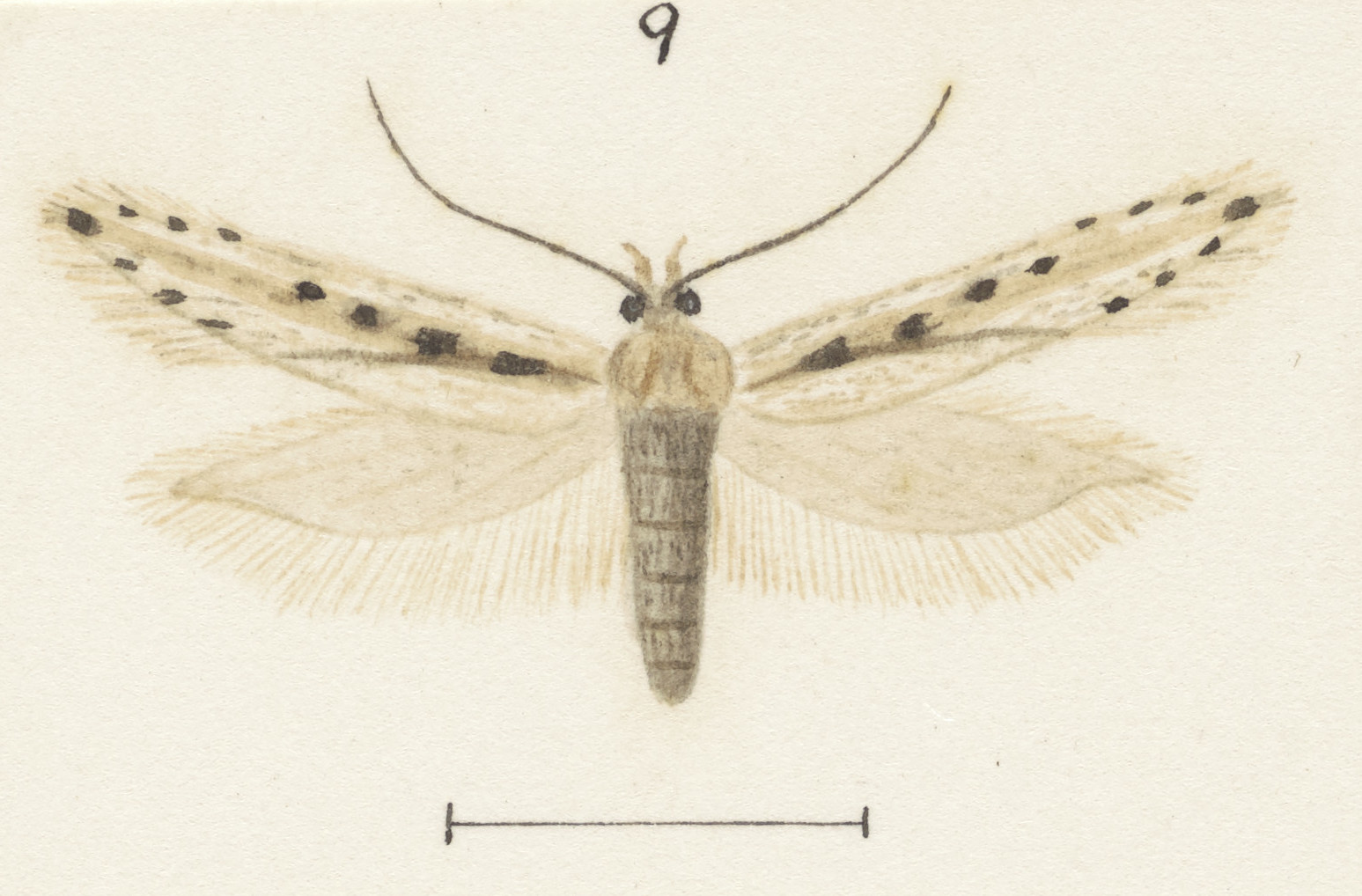
- Illustration of female

Scientific classification
- Kingdom: Animalia
- Phylum: Arthropoda
- Class: Insecta
- Order: Lepidoptera
- Family: Gelechiidae
- Genus: Kiwaia
- Species: K. cheradias

Binomial name
- Kiwaia cheradias (Meyrick, 1909)

Synonyms
- Gelechia cheradias Meyrick, 1909

= Kiwaia cheradias =

Species of moth

Kiwaia cheradias is a species of moth in the family Gelechiidae . It was described by Edward Meyrick in 1909. It is endemic to New Zealand.

The wingspan is 12–13 mm. The forewings are light ochreous-brown, suffusedly irrorated with whitish, tending to leave a more or less clear longitudinal median streak of ground colour. There is a blackish mark on the fold towards the base. The discal stigmata are rather large and black, the plical represented by a dark fuscous or brown cloud, very obliquely before the first discal. There are several cloudy blackish or dark fuscous dots on the posterior part of the costa and termen. The hindwings are light grey.
