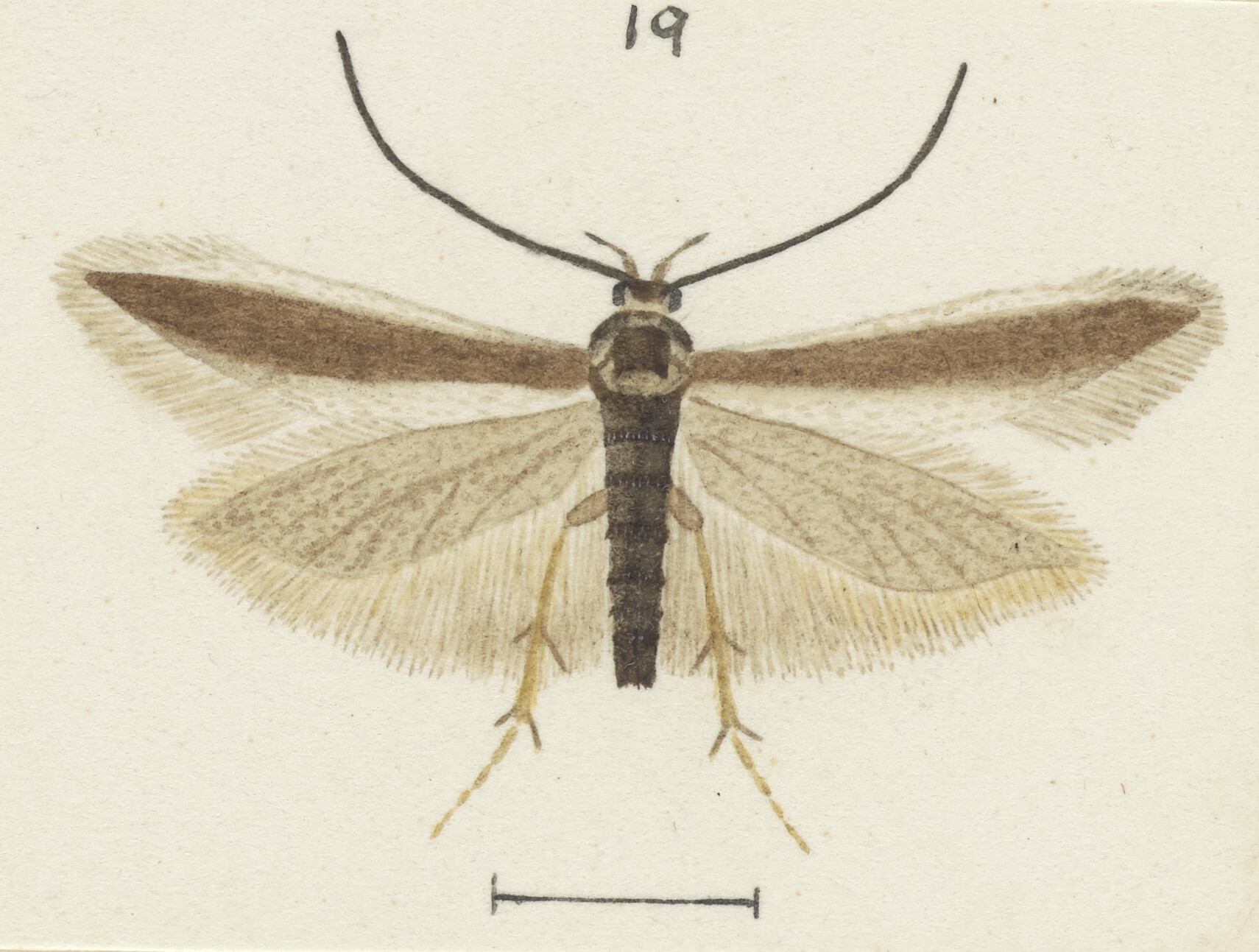

Scientific classification
- Kingdom: Animalia
- Phylum: Arthropoda
- Clade: Pancrustacea
- Class: Insecta
- Order: Lepidoptera
- Family: Gelechiidae
- Genus: Kiwaia
- Species: K. eurybathra

Binomial name
- Kiwaia eurybathra (Meyrick, 1931)

Synonyms
- Gelechia eurybathra Meyrick, 1931

= Kiwaia eurybathra =

Species of moth

Kiwaia eurybathra is a moth in the family Gelechiidae. It was described by Edward Meyrick in 1931. It is found in New Zealand.
