= Kiwaia palaearctica =

Scientific classification
- Kingdom: Animalia
- Phylum: Arthropoda
- Clade: Pancrustacea
- Class: Insecta
- Order: Lepidoptera
- Family: Gelechiidae
- Genus: Kiwaia
- Species: K. palaearctica

Binomial name
- Kiwaia palaearctica (Povolný, 1968)

Synonyms
- Empista palaearctica Povolný, 1968; Empista (Empista) palaearctica secunda Povolný, 1976

Species of moth

Kiwaia palaearctica is a moth in the family Gelechiidae. It was described by Povolný in 1968. It is found in Nepal.
