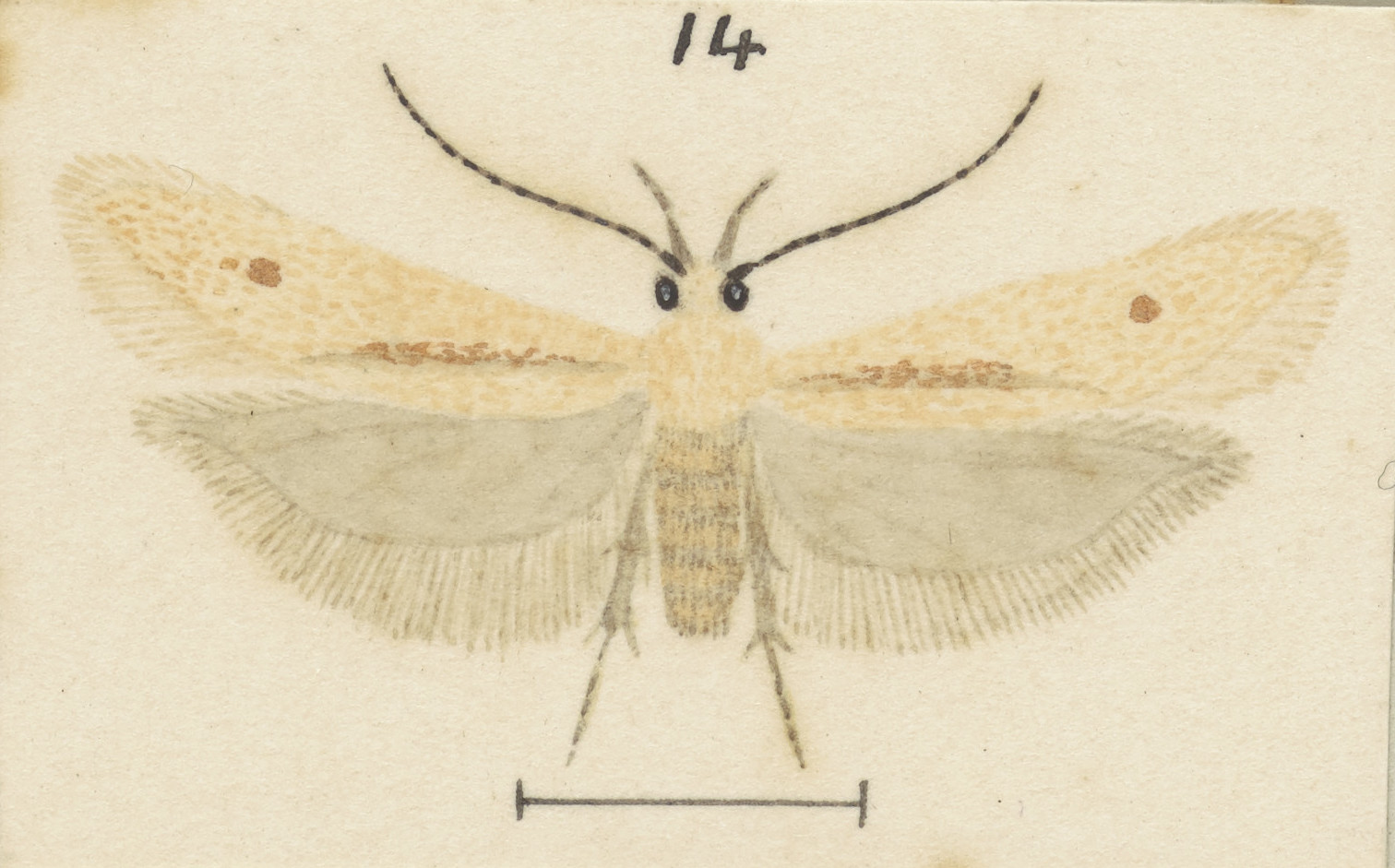

Scientific classification
- Domain: Eukaryota
- Kingdom: Animalia
- Phylum: Arthropoda
- Class: Insecta
- Order: Lepidoptera
- Family: Gelechiidae
- Genus: Kiwaia
- Species: K. neglecta

Binomial name
- Kiwaia neglecta (Philpott, 1924)

Synonyms
- Gelechia neglecta Philpott, 1924

= Kiwaia neglecta =

Species of moth

Kiwaia neglecta is a moth in the family Gelechiidae. It was described by Philpott in 1924. It is found in New Zealand.

The wingspan is 10–13 mm. The forewings are ochreous-whitish with a ferruginous suffusion along the fold, sometimes extended to before the apex, sometimes absent. The area beneath the fold is usually clearer white. The hindwings are pale fuscous-grey.
