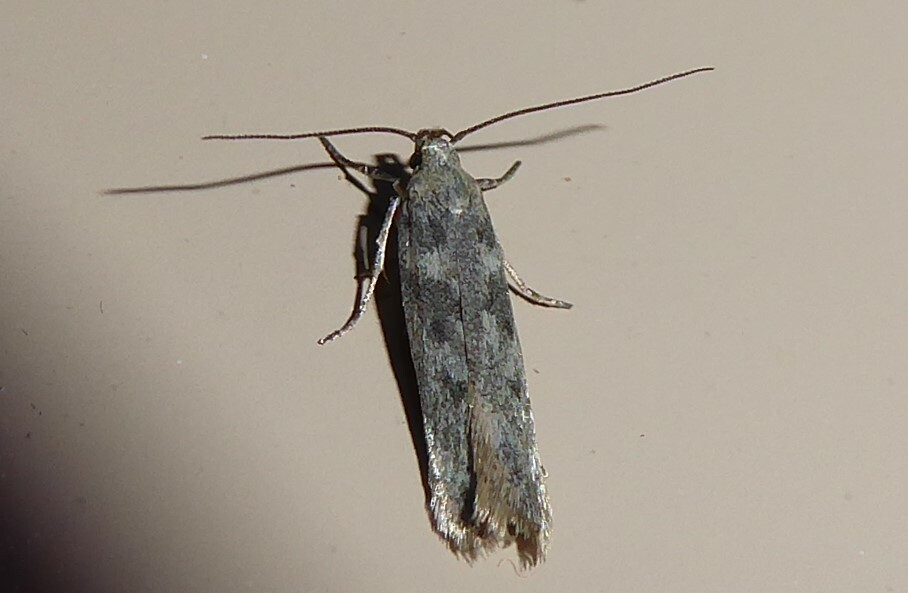

Scientific classification
- Domain: Eukaryota
- Kingdom: Animalia
- Phylum: Arthropoda
- Class: Insecta
- Order: Lepidoptera
- Family: Gelechiidae
- Genus: Kiwaia
- Species: K. lithodes

Binomial name
- Kiwaia lithodes (Meyrick, 1886)

Synonyms
- Gelechia lithodes Meyrick, 1886

= Kiwaia lithodes =

Species of moth

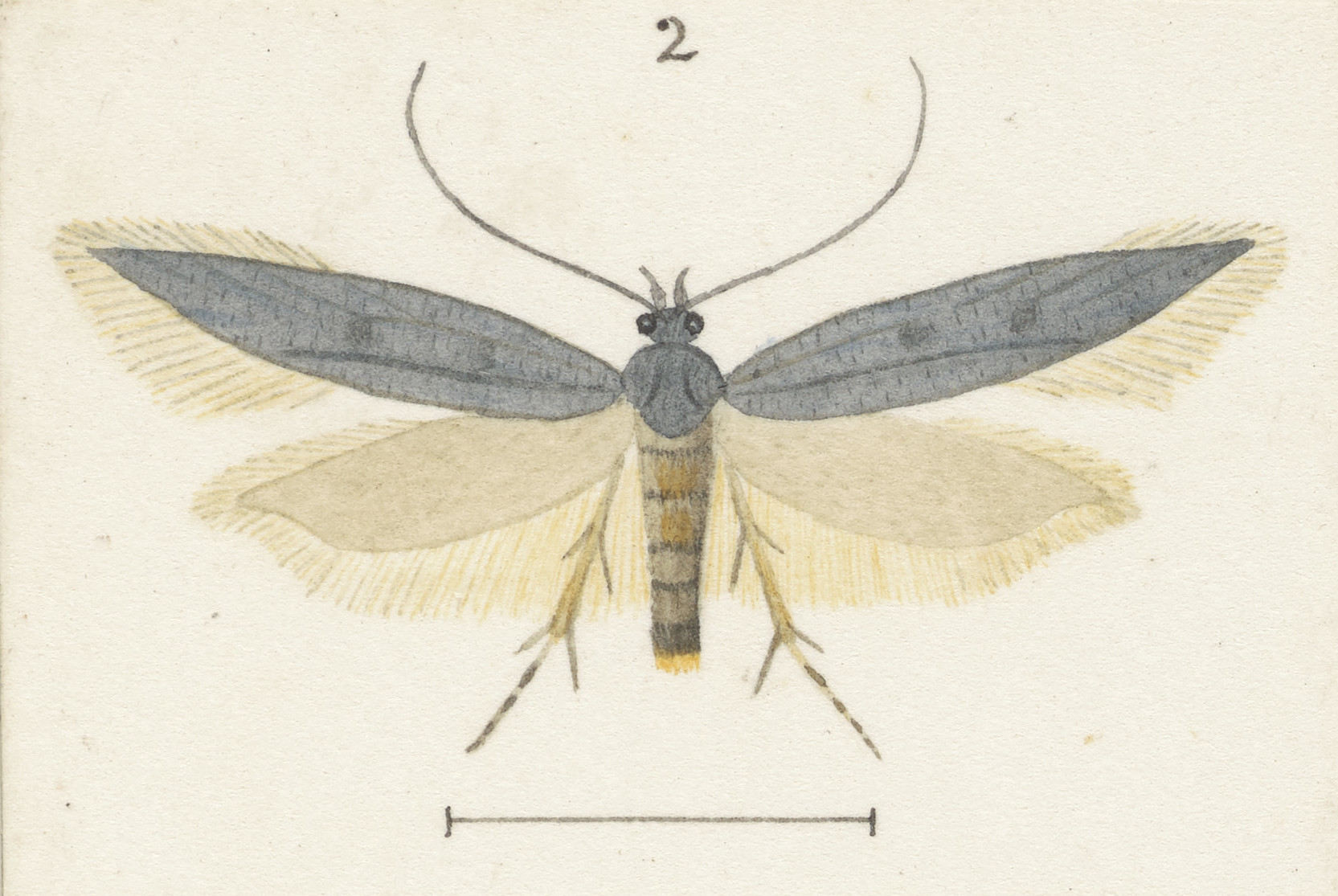
Watercolour by George Hudson c. 1927

Kiwaia lithodes is a moth in the family Gelechiidae. It was described by Edward Meyrick in 1886. It is found in New Zealand.

The wingspan is about 16 mm. The forewings are grey, finely irrorated (sprinkled) with blue whitish. Three discal spots are obscurely darker, the first before the middle, the second on the fold rather before the first and the third in the disc beyond the middle. The hindwings are whitish grey.

The larvae of this species feed on Raoulia australis.
