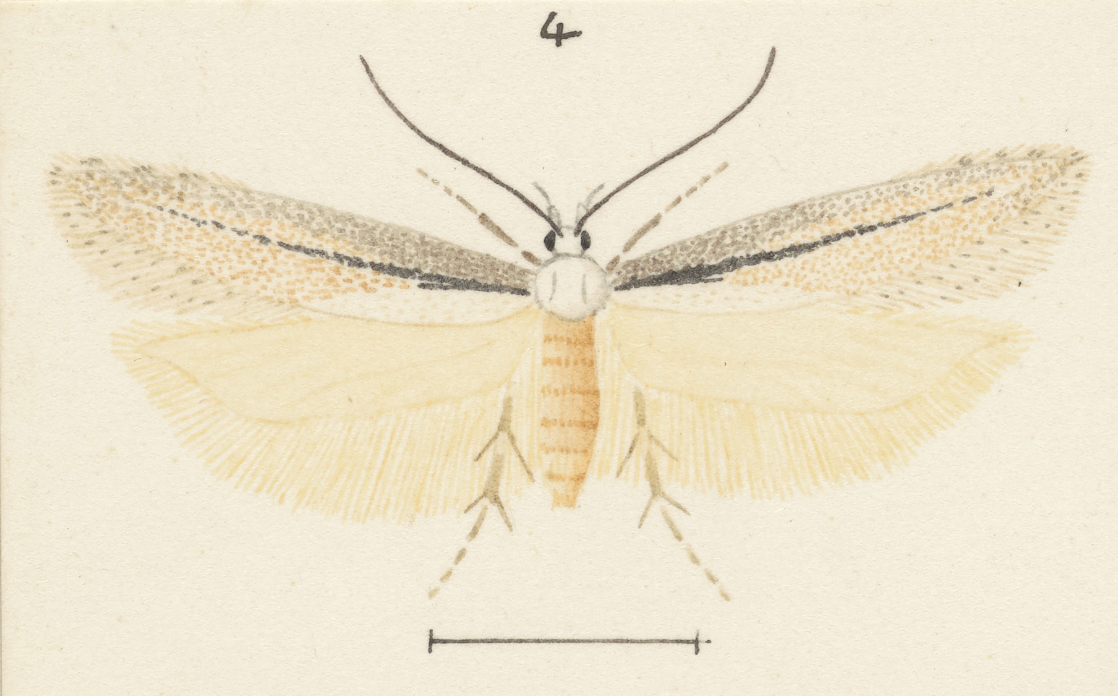
- Illustration of male by George Vernon Hudson

Conservation status
- Data Deficit (NZ TCS)

Scientific classification
- Kingdom: Animalia
- Phylum: Arthropoda
- Clade: Pancrustacea
- Class: Insecta
- Order: Lepidoptera
- Family: Gelechiidae
- Genus: Kiwaia
- Species: K. pumila

Binomial name
- Kiwaia pumila (Philpott, 1928)

Synonyms
- Gelechia pumila Philpott, 1928

= Kiwaia pumila =

Species of moth

Kiwaia pumila is a moth in the family Gelechiidae. It is endemic to New Zealand. In 2025 this species was classified as "data deficient" under the New Zealand Threat Classification System.

== Taxonomy ==
This species was described by Alfred Philpott in 1928 and named Gelechia pumila. Philpott used specimens collected by Stuart Lindsay in Yaldhurst in May. George Vernon Hudson discussed and illustrated the species in 1939. In 1987 Klaus Siegfried Oskar Sattler placed this species in the genus Kiwaia. The type specimen is held at the Canterbury Museum.

== Description ==
Philpott described the species as follows:

Male. 10-12mm. Head and palpi white, second segment of palpi sprinkled with fuscous. Antennae fuscous. Thorax white, tegulae more or less infuscated. Abdomen greyish white, basal segments brassy. Legs greyish fuscous, anterior tarsi obscurely annulated with whitish. Forewings elongate, apex acute, termen very oblique; white, irrorated, especially on costal half, with pale ochreous; some dull ochreous scales on apical half; a blackish fuscous median stripe from base to apex, irregular on margins and sometimes almost interrupted; fringes ochreous white with a few fuscous scales round apex. Hind wings with apex acute, termen moderately sinuate; shining white; fringes ochreous white.

== Distribution ==
K. pumila is endemic to New Zealand. Its range covers Marlborough, Mackenzie country and mid Canterbury. As well as the type locality of Yaldhurst, specimens have been collected at Clarence Bridge and Lake Pukaki, as well as on McLeans Island in Christchurch.

== Life cycle and habitat ==
Adult moths are on the wing in March. The species is associated with damp patches in grass habitat.

== Host plants ==
The host plant for this species is unknown.

== Conservation status ==
In 2025 this species was classified by the New Zealand Department of Conservation as "data deficient" under the New Zealand Threat Classification System. This species is regarded as range restricted and biologically sparse.
