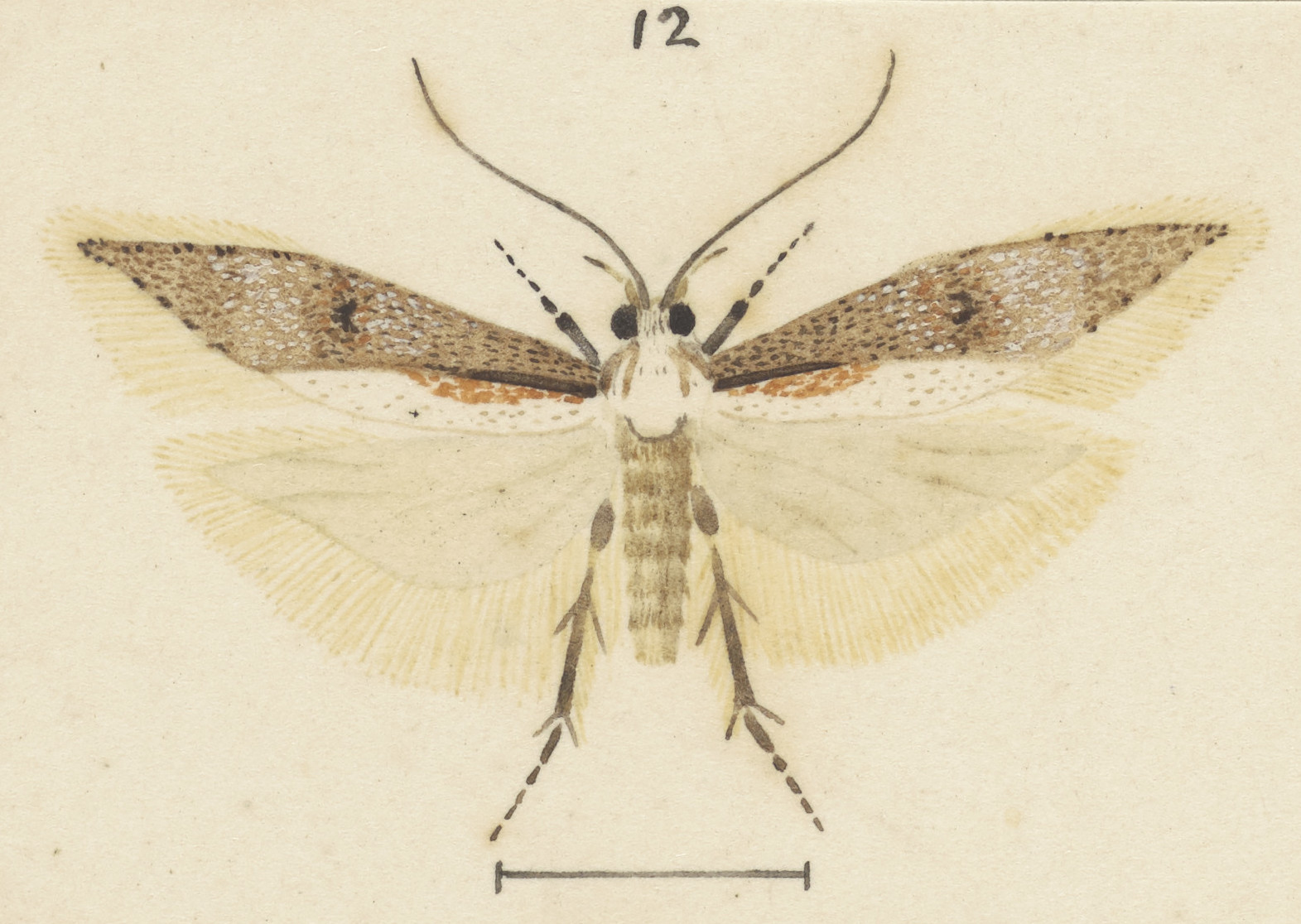

Scientific classification
- Domain: Eukaryota
- Kingdom: Animalia
- Phylum: Arthropoda
- Class: Insecta
- Order: Lepidoptera
- Family: Gelechiidae
- Genus: Kiwaia
- Species: K. heterospora

Binomial name
- Kiwaia heterospora (Meyrick, 1924)

Synonyms
- Phthorimaea heterospora Meyrick, 1924

= Kiwaia heterospora =

Species of moth

Kiwaia heterospora is a moth in the family Gelechiidae. It was described by Edward Meyrick in 1924. It is found in New Zealand.

The wingspan is about 11 mm. The forewings are light brownish ochreous, on the costal half suffusedly irrorated (sprinkled) with fuscous, between the stigmata and on the terminal area sprinkled with whitish, the dorsal area beneath the fold is suffused with whitish. The discal stigmata are variably indicated by irregular dark-fuscous irroration, approximated, with the plical black, somewhat before the first discal. The costa posteriorly and termen are sprinkled dark fuscous. The hindwings are pale grey or grey whitish.
