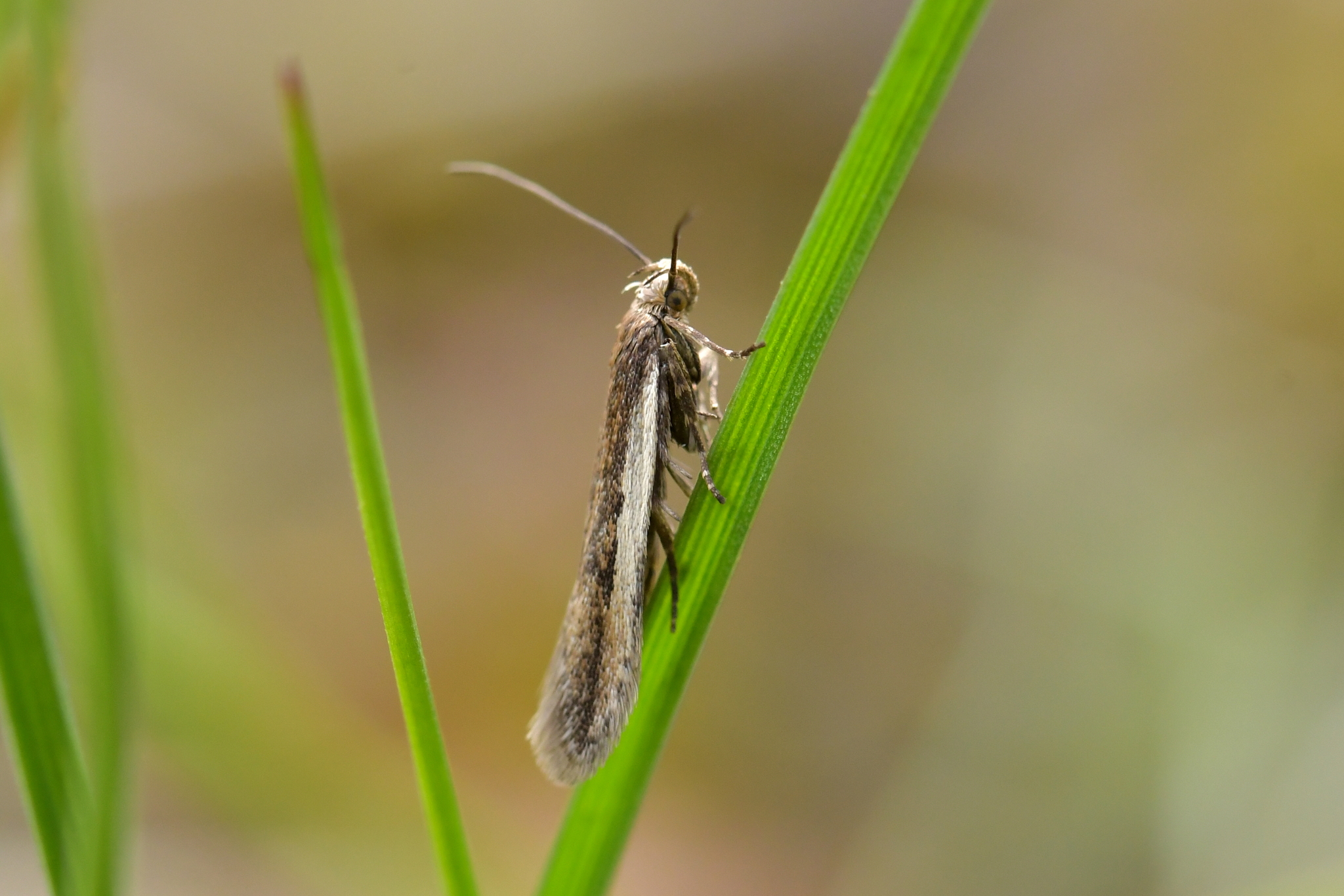
- Kiwaia aerobatis seen near Salisbury Lodge in Kahurangi National Park

Scientific classification
- Domain: Eukaryota
- Kingdom: Animalia
- Phylum: Arthropoda
- Class: Insecta
- Order: Lepidoptera
- Family: Gelechiidae
- Genus: Kiwaia
- Species: K. aerobatis

Binomial name
- Kiwaia aerobatis (Meyrick, 1924)

Synonyms
- Gelechia aerobatis Meyrick, 1924

= Kiwaia aerobatis =

Species of moth

Kiwaia aerobatis is a species of moth in the family Gelechiidae. This species was first described by Edward Meyrick in 1924. It is endemic to New Zealand and has been collected at Mount Arthur and at Arthur's Pass. Adults are on the wing in January.

== Taxonomy ==
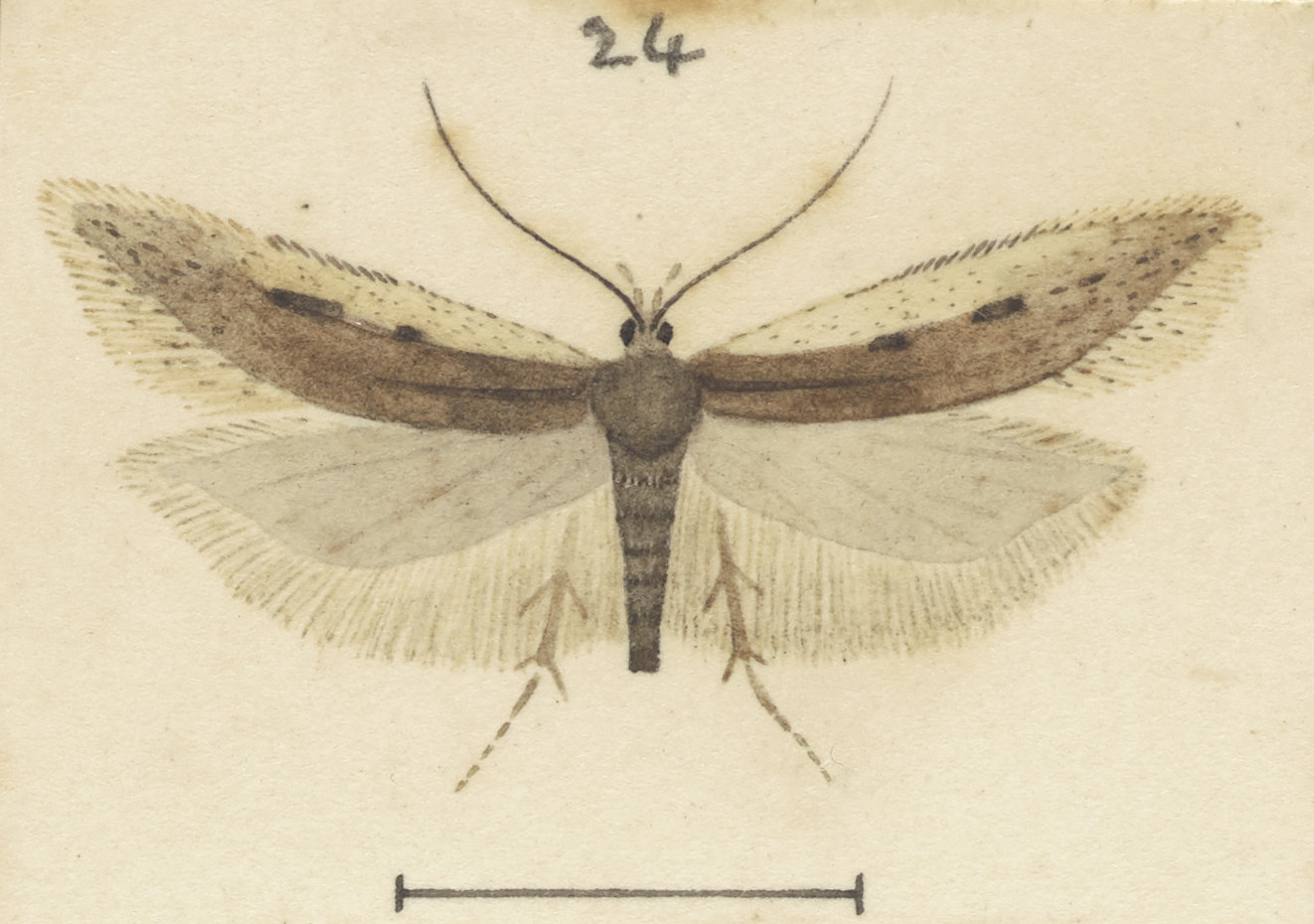
Watercolour of a male specimen

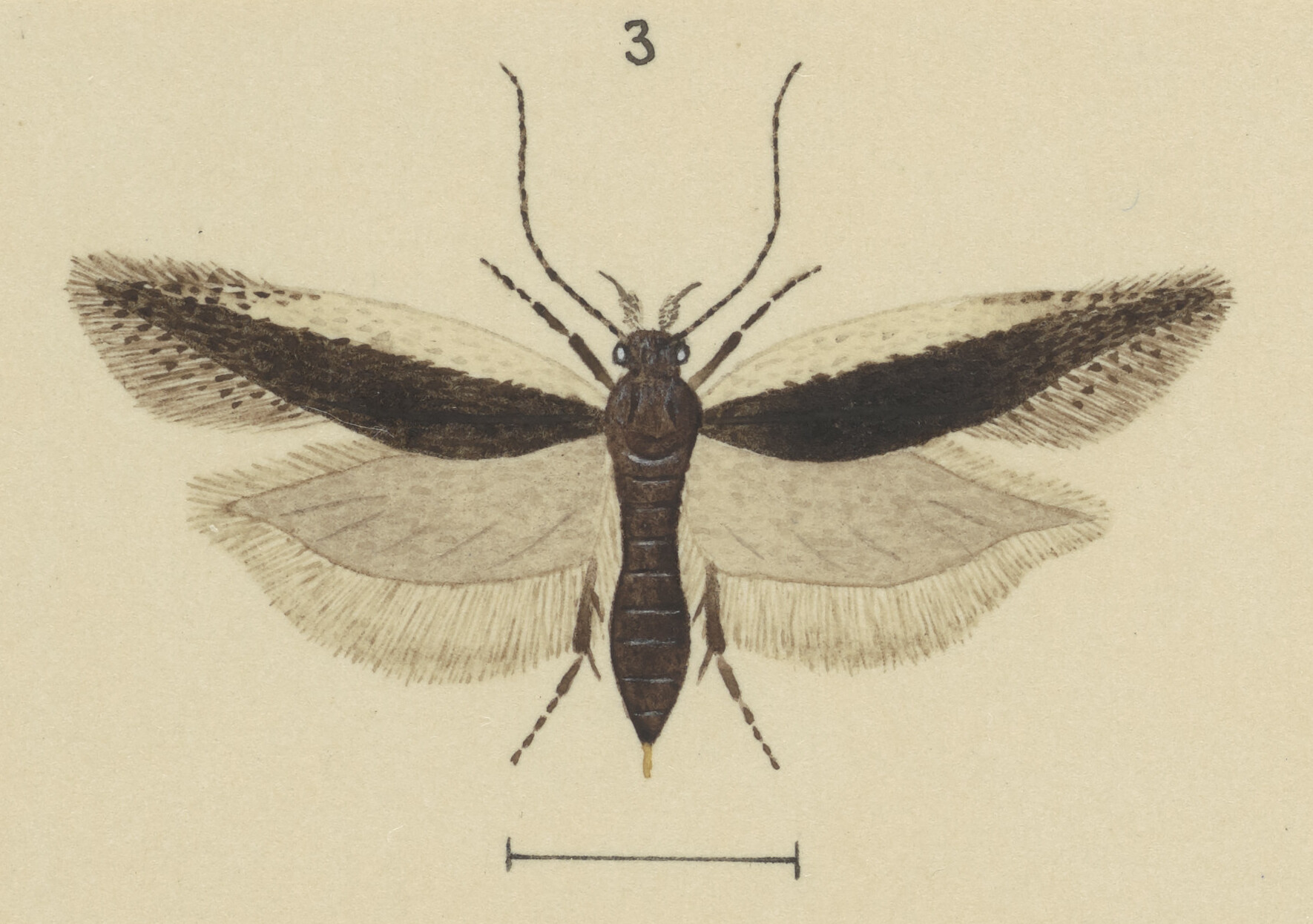
Watercolour of a female specimen

This species was first described by Edward Meyrick in 1924 using two specimens he and George Hudson collected at Mount Arthur and named Gelechia aerobatis. In 1928 George Hudson discussed and illustrated this species in his book The butterflies and moths of New Zealand under the same name. Hudson went on to again discuss and illustrate this species in the 1939 supplement to that work. In January 1988 Klaus Sattler placed this species within the genus Kiwaia. This placement was followed by J. S. Dugdale later in 1988. The male lectotype is held at the Natural History Museum, London.

== Description ==
The wingspan is about 15 mm. The forewings are rather light brownish, darker towards base. There is a rather broad whitish costal streak nearly from the base to two-thirds, narrowed near the base, the posterior extremity suffused, with a slender suffused dark-grey streak on the costal edge from before the middle of the wing to two-thirds. The discal stigmata are rather elongate, dark fuscous, touching the lower edge of the whitish streak, the plical slightly marked or obsolete, somewhat before the first discal. There is some fuscous irroration (sprinkling) running from the second discal to beneath the apex and the costa posteriorly and termen are interruptedly lined fuscous. The hindwings are light grey.

The female of the species has more strongly contrasted colouring with the forewing costal area being creamy-white and the dorsal area being broader and deep chocolate-brown in colour. This deep colouration obscures the discal markings. The as well as the dorsal colour being a deep chocolate brown so also is the head, thorax and abdomen. In comparison to the male the female has shorter wings which are more intensely pointed.

== Distribution ==
This species is endemic to New Zealand. As well as the type locality of Mount Arthur, this species has also been collected at Arthur's Pass.

== Behaviour ==
Adults are on the wing in January.
