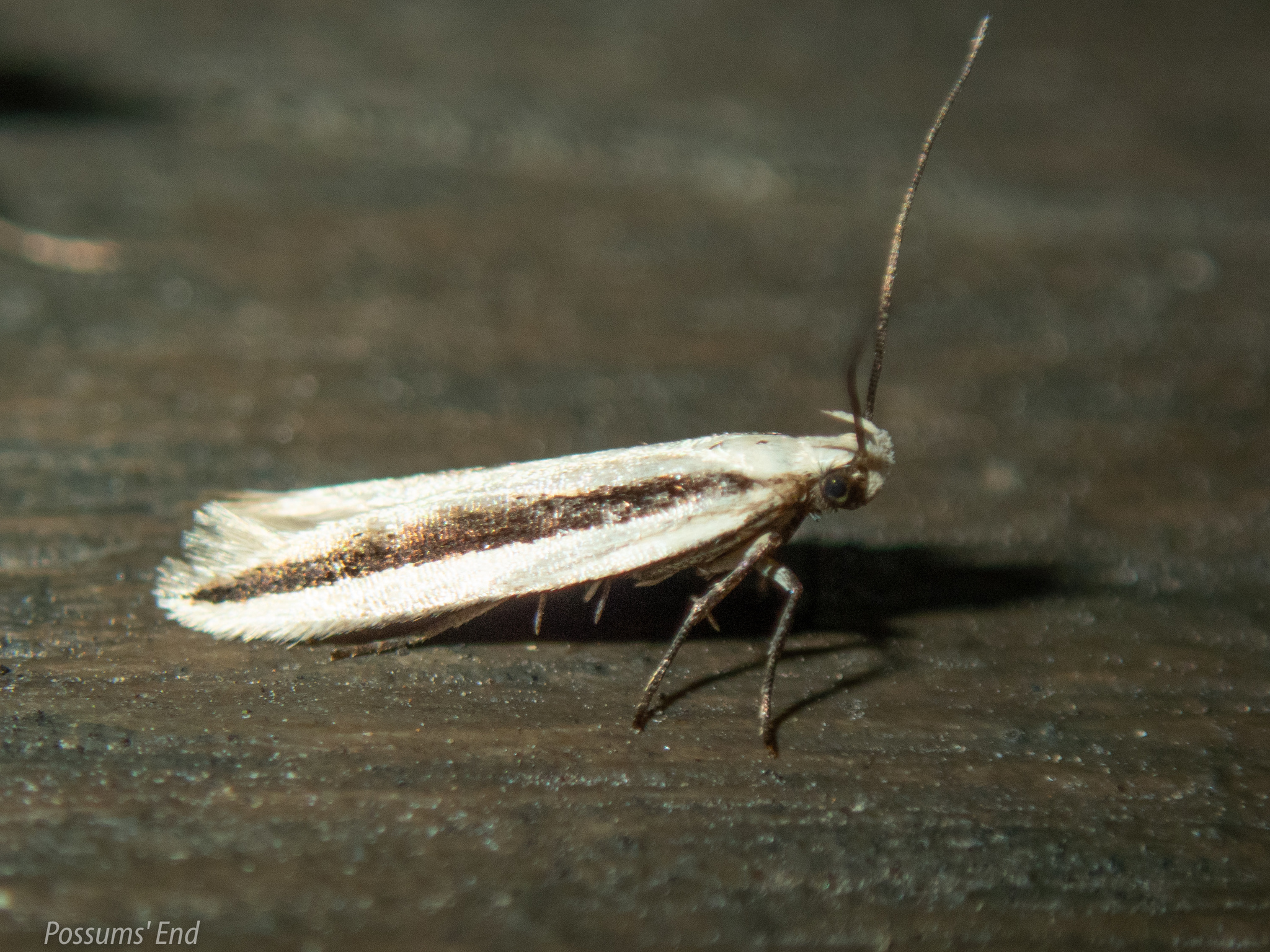
- Kiwaia monophragma

Scientific classification
- Kingdom: Animalia
- Phylum: Arthropoda
- Clade: Pancrustacea
- Class: Insecta
- Order: Lepidoptera
- Family: Gelechiidae
- Subfamily: Gelechiinae
- Tribe: Gnorimoschemini
- Genus: Kiwaia; Philpott, 1930

Synonyms
- Empista Povolný, 1968; Zeempista Povolný, 1974

= Kiwaia =

Genus of moths

Kiwaia is a genus of moths in the family Gelechiidae. It was first described by Alfred Philpott in 1930. Two subgenera are currently recognised, (i) the nominotypical subgenus with 25 species from New Zealand, and (ii) subgenus Empista with 4 species from the Palaearctic Region.

== Species ==
Subgenus Kiwaia

- Kiwaia aerobatis (Meyrick, 1924)
- Kiwaia brontophora (Meyrick, 1886)
- Kiwaia caerulea (Hudson, 1925)
- Kiwaia calaspidea (Clarke, 1934)
- Kiwaia cheradias (Meyrick, 1909)
- Kiwaia contraria (Philpott, 1930)
- Kiwaia dividua (Philpott, 1921)
- Kiwaia eurybathra (Meyrick, 1931)
- Kiwaia glaucoterma (Meyrick, 1911)
- Kiwaia heterospora (Meyrick, 1924)
- Kiwaia hippeis (Meyrick, 1901)
- Kiwaia jeanae Philpott, 1930
- Kiwaia lapillosa (Meyrick, 1924)
- Kiwaia lenis (Philpott, 1929)
- Kiwaia lithodes (Meyrick, 1886)
- Kiwaia matermea (Povolný, 1974)
- Kiwaia monophragma (Meyrick, 1886)
- Kiwaia neglecta (Philpott, 1924)
- Kiwaia parapleura (Meyrick, 1885)
- Kiwaia parvula (Philpott, 1930)
- Kiwaia pharetria (Meyrick, 1886)
- Kiwaia plemochoa (Meyrick, 1916)
- Kiwaia pumila (Philpott, 1928)
- Kiwaia schematica (Meyrick, 1886)
- Kiwaia thyraula (Meyrick, 1886) [=Kiwaia quieta (Philpott, 1927)]

Subgenus Empista

- Kiwaia kostjuki Povolný, 2001
- Kiwaia kumatai (Povolný, 1976)
- Kiwaia palaearctica (Povolný, 1968)
- Kiwaia spinosa (Povolný, 1976)
