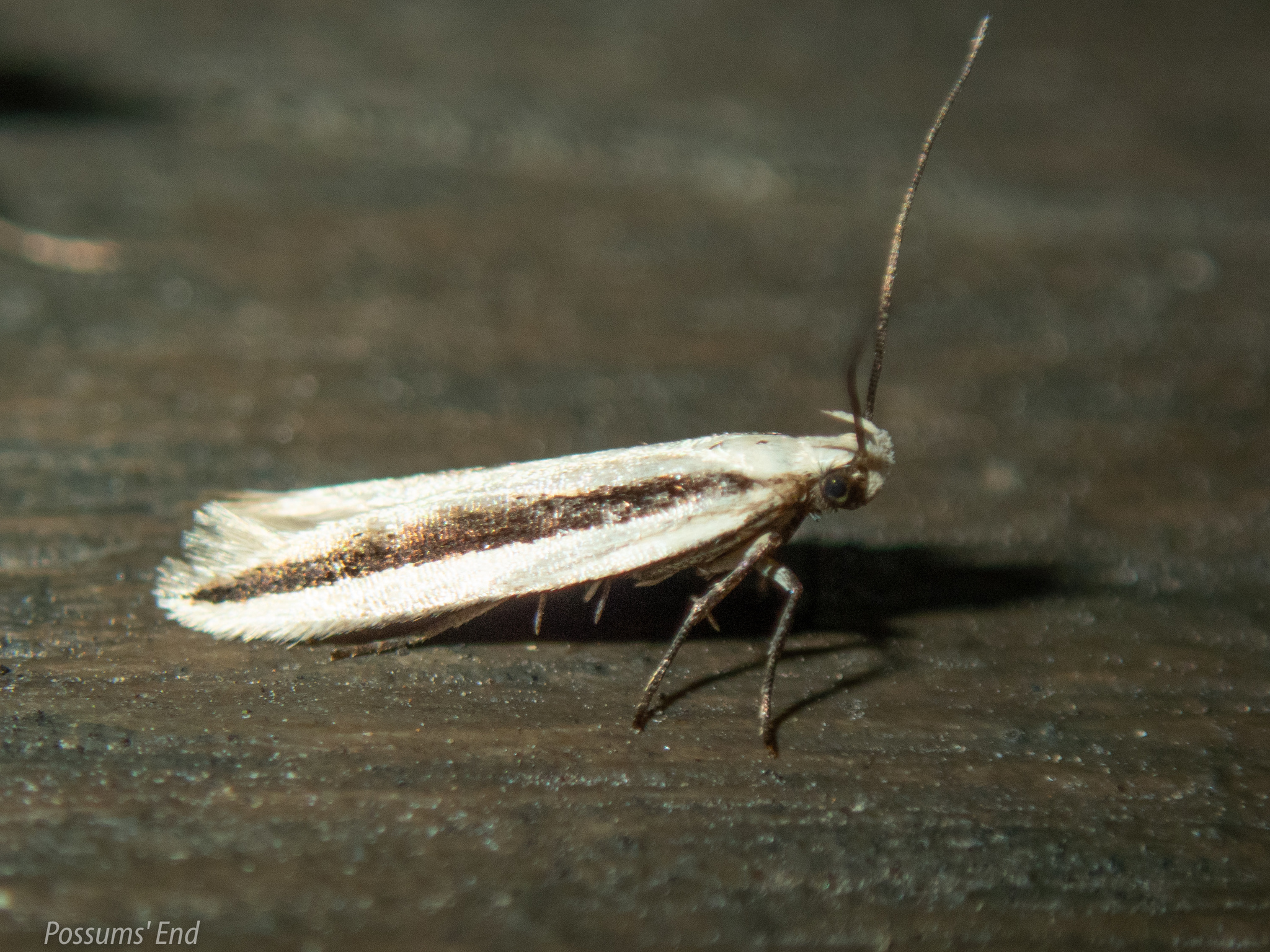

Scientific classification
- Domain: Eukaryota
- Kingdom: Animalia
- Phylum: Arthropoda
- Class: Insecta
- Order: Lepidoptera
- Family: Gelechiidae
- Genus: Kiwaia
- Species: K. monophragma

Binomial name
- Kiwaia monophragma (Meyrick, 1886)

Synonyms
- Gelechia monophragma Meyrick, 1886

= Kiwaia monophragma =

Species of moth

Kiwaia monophragma is a moth in the family Gelechiidae. It was described by Edward Meyrick in 1886. It is found in New Zealand.

The wingspan is 11–15 mm. The forewings are ochreous whitish, somewhat irrorated (sprinkled) with ochreous and with a narrow blackish central streak from the base to the apex, sometimes suffused with ochreous beneath, variable in strength, rarely partially obsolete, and tending to form two separate discal spots towards the middle. The hindwings are pale whitish grey.
