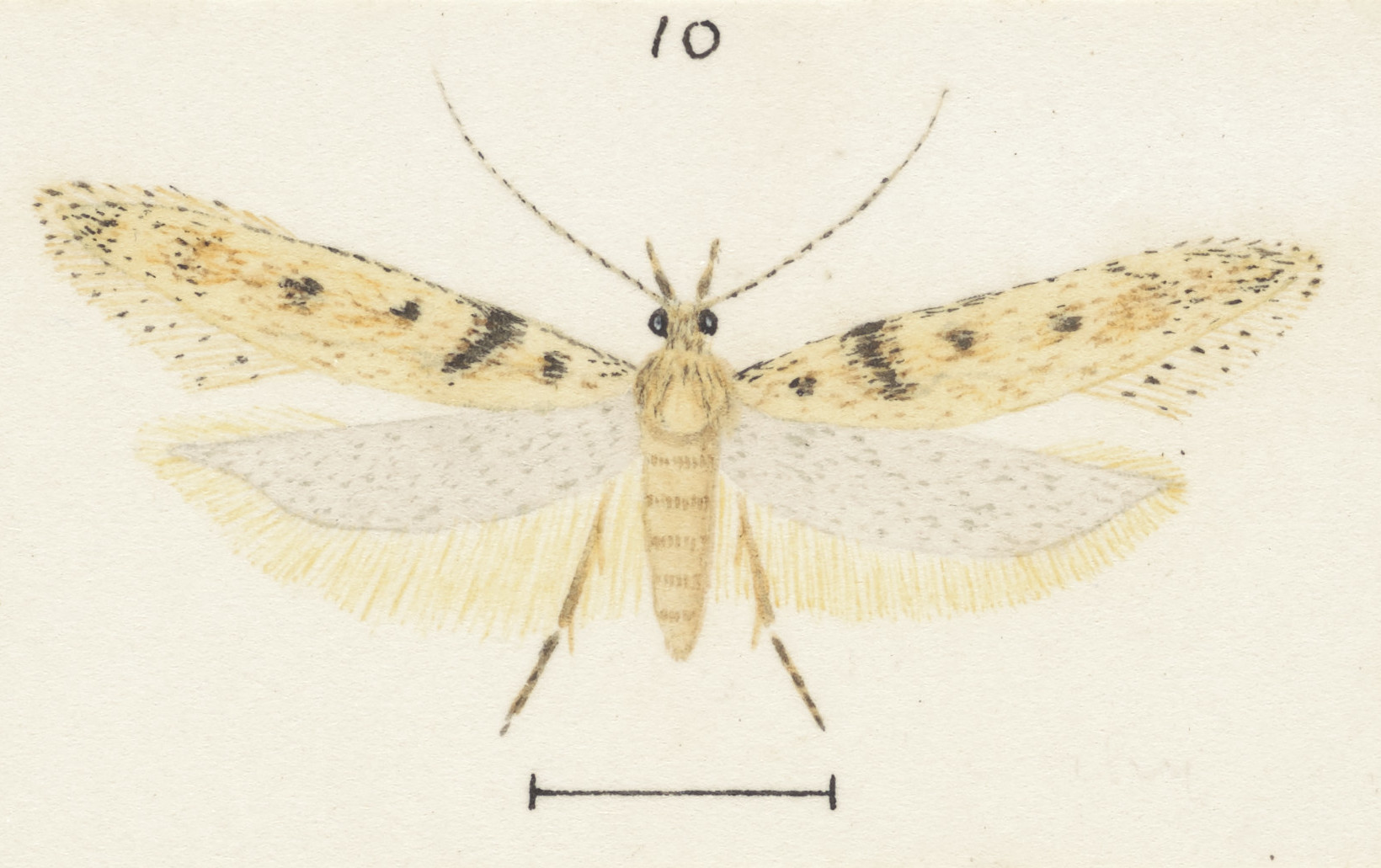
- Illustration of female
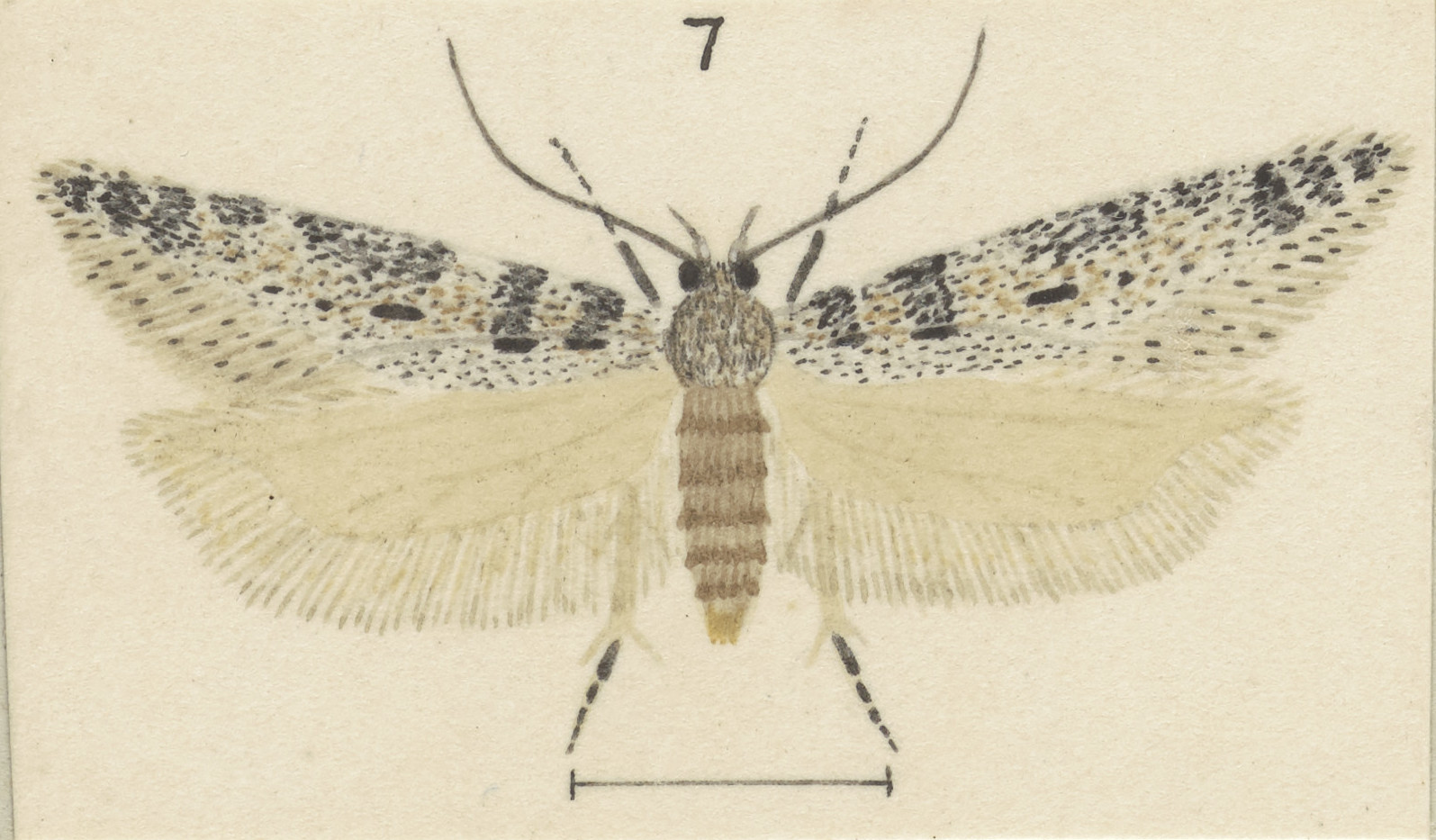
- Illustration of male

Scientific classification
- Domain: Eukaryota
- Kingdom: Animalia
- Phylum: Arthropoda
- Class: Insecta
- Order: Lepidoptera
- Family: Gelechiidae
- Genus: Kiwaia
- Species: K. thyraula

Binomial name
- Kiwaia thyraula (Meyrick, 1885)

Synonyms
- Gelechia thyraula Meyrick, 1885; Phthorimaea quieta Philpott, 1927; Kiwaia quieta Phthorimaea pulverea; Philpott, 1928

= Kiwaia thyraula =

Species of moth

Kiwaia thyraula is a moth in the family Gelechiidae. It was described by Edward Meyrick in 1885. It is endemic to New Zealand.

The wingspan is 9–11 mm. The forewings are whitish, irrorated with black. The markings are black and ill-defined. There is a small spot on the costa near the base, and a second obliquely beyond it on the fold. A rather oblique streak runs from the costa beyond one-fourth, reaching half across the wing. There are three small discal spots, the first in the middle, the second on the fold obliquely before the first and almost touching the apex of the transverse streak and the third in the disc beyond the middle. The hindwings are pale whitish-grey.
