= Kiwaia kumatai =

Scientific classification
- Kingdom: Animalia
- Phylum: Arthropoda
- Clade: Pancrustacea
- Class: Insecta
- Order: Lepidoptera
- Family: Gelechiidae
- Genus: Kiwaia
- Species: K. kumatai

Binomial name
- Kiwaia kumatai (Povolný, 1976)

Synonyms
- Empista (Empista) lenis Povolný, 1976

Species of moth

Kiwaia kumatai is a moth in the family Gelechiidae. It was described by Povolný in 1976. It is found in Nepal.
