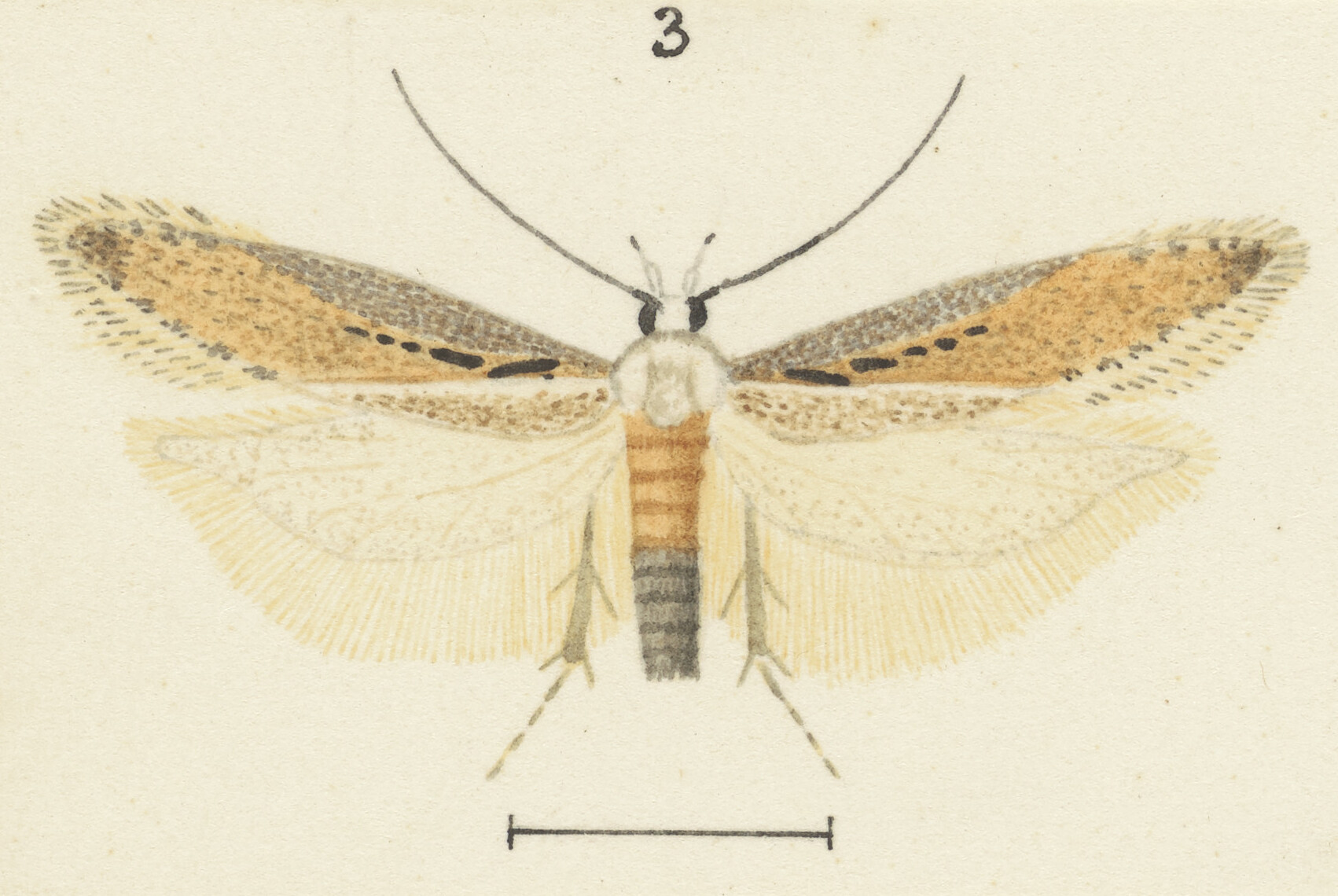

Scientific classification
- Kingdom: Animalia
- Phylum: Arthropoda
- Clade: Pancrustacea
- Class: Insecta
- Order: Lepidoptera
- Family: Gelechiidae
- Genus: Kiwaia
- Species: K. lenis

Binomial name
- Kiwaia lenis (Philpott, 1929)

Synonyms
- Gelechia lenis Philpott, 1929

= Kiwaia lenis =

Species of moth

Kiwaia lenis is a moth in the family Gelechiidae. It was described by Philpott in 1929. It is found in New Zealand.

The wingspan is 13–14 mm.
