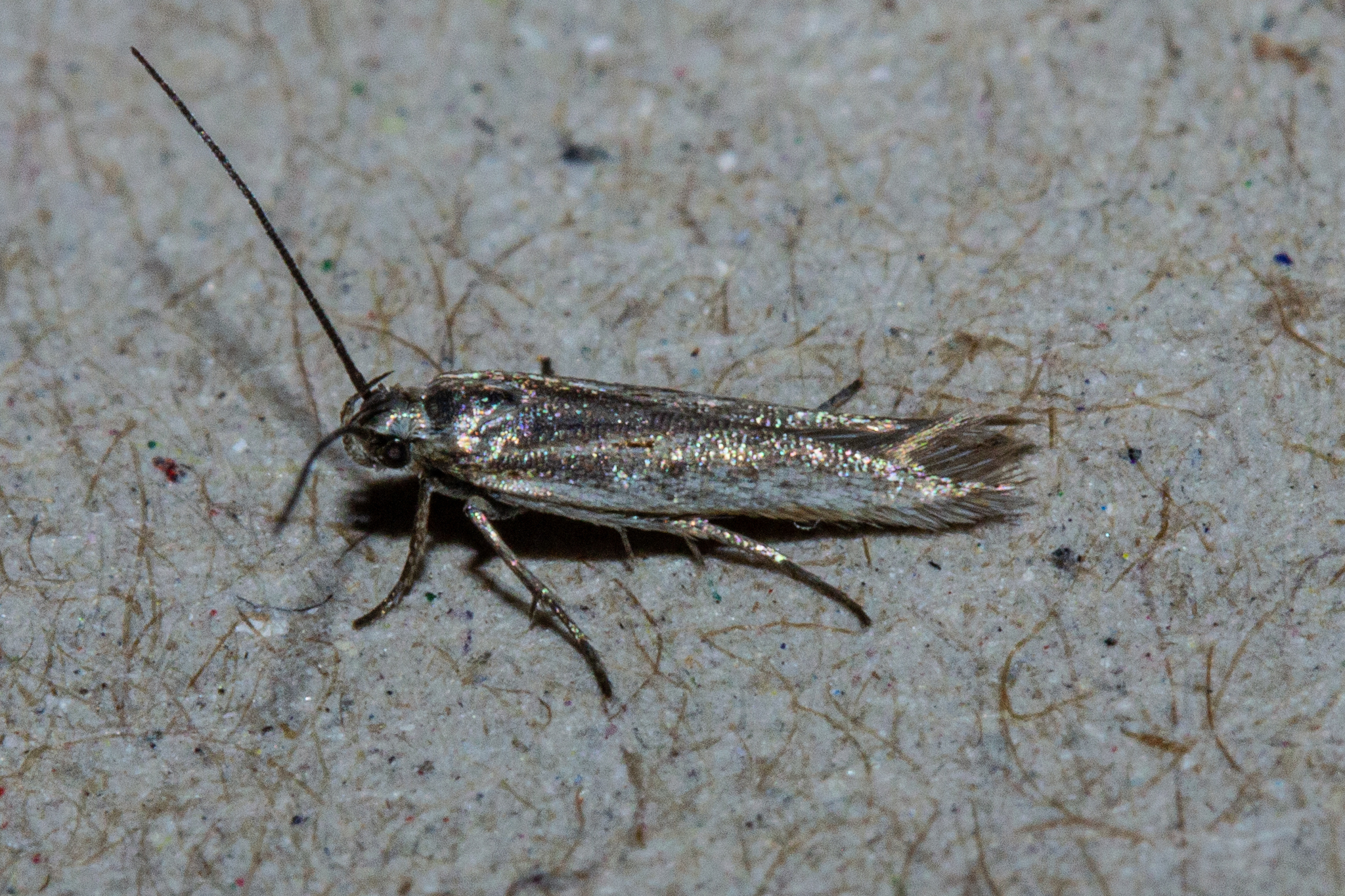

Scientific classification
- Domain: Eukaryota
- Kingdom: Animalia
- Phylum: Arthropoda
- Class: Insecta
- Order: Lepidoptera
- Family: Gelechiidae
- Genus: Kiwaia
- Species: K. plemochoa

Binomial name
- Kiwaia plemochoa (Meyrick, 1916)

Synonyms
- Phthorimaea plemochoa Meyrick, 1916

= Kiwaia plemochoa =

Species of moth

Kiwaia plemochoa is a moth in the family Gelechiidae. It was described by Edward Meyrick in 1916. It is found in New Zealand.

The wingspan is 11–12 mm for males and 8–9 mm for females. The forewings are lighter or darker bronzy ochreous, more or less tinged or suffused with grey and with a broad streak of whitish suffusion along the costa, becoming subcostal for more or less the distance beyond the middle. The plical and second discal stigmata are sometimes dark fuscous, sometimes obsolete. The hindwings are bluish grey.
