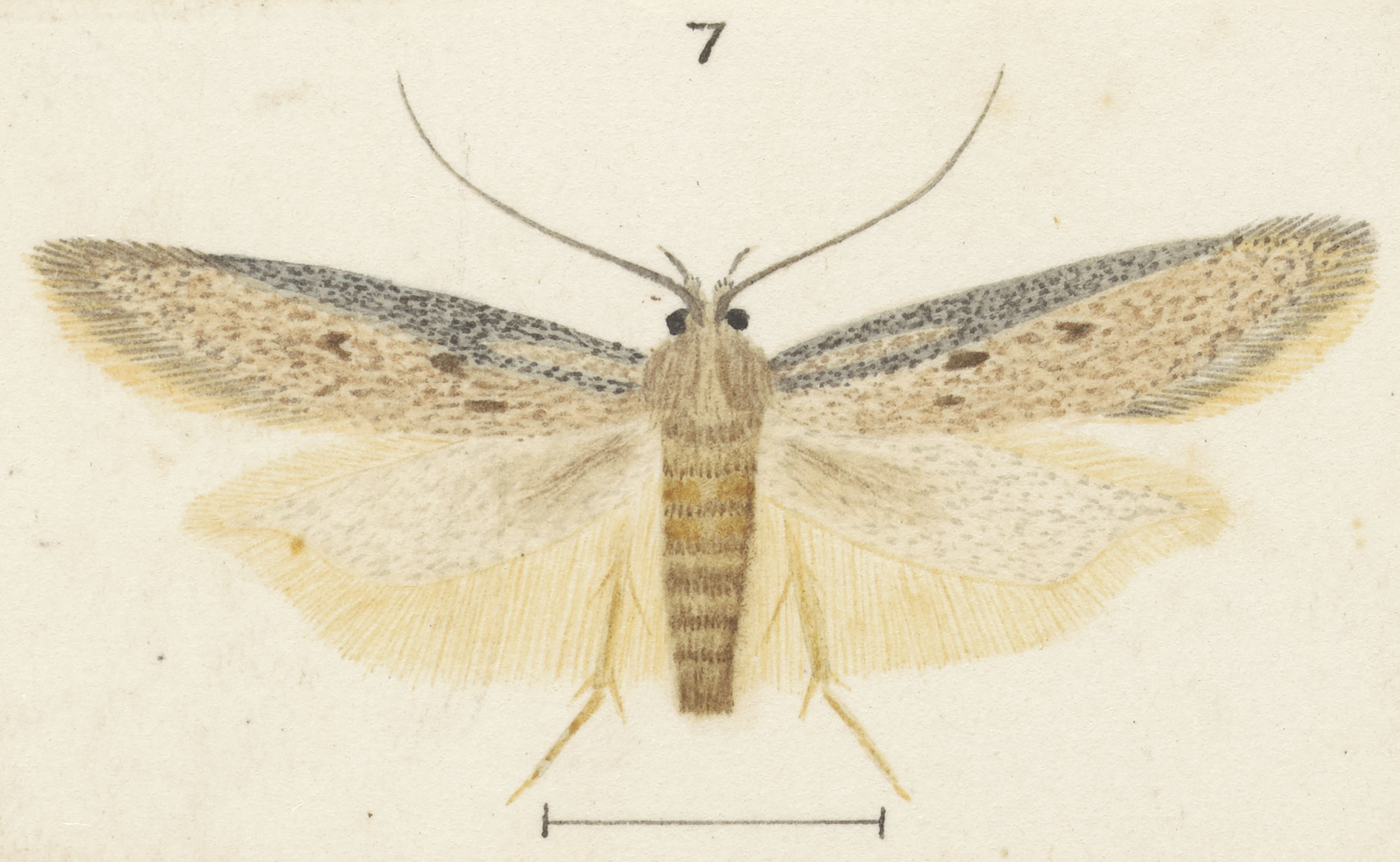

Scientific classification
- Domain: Eukaryota
- Kingdom: Animalia
- Phylum: Arthropoda
- Class: Insecta
- Order: Lepidoptera
- Family: Gelechiidae
- Genus: Kiwaia
- Species: K. schematica

Binomial name
- Kiwaia schematica (Meyrick, 1885)

Synonyms
- Gelechia schematica Meyrick, 1885

= Kiwaia schematica =

Species of moth

Kiwaia schematica is a moth in the family Gelechiidae. It was described by Edward Meyrick in 1885. It is found in New Zealand.

The wingspan is 16–17 mm. The forewings are light greyish-ochreous towards the disc, sometimes irrorated with deep ochreous. There is a dark grey or blackish irroration forming a broad suffused streak along the costa from the base to two-third, posteriorly attenuated, variable in intensity, generally divided by a cloudy oblique streak of ground-colour from the base to the middle of the costa. There are three small dark fuscous discal spots, the first before the middle, the second on the fold obliquely before the first and the third in the disc at three-fifths. The hindwings are whitish-grey, with a cloudy longitudinal streak of dark fuscous scales in the disc towards the base.
