= Kiwaia spinosa =

Scientific classification
- Kingdom: Animalia
- Phylum: Arthropoda
- Clade: Pancrustacea
- Class: Insecta
- Order: Lepidoptera
- Family: Gelechiidae
- Genus: Kiwaia
- Species: K. spinosa

Binomial name
- Kiwaia spinosa (Povolný, 1976)

Synonyms
- Empista (Empista) spinosa Povolný, 1976

Species of moth

Kiwaia spinosa is a moth in the family Gelechiidae. It was described by Povolný in 1976. It is found in Nepal.
