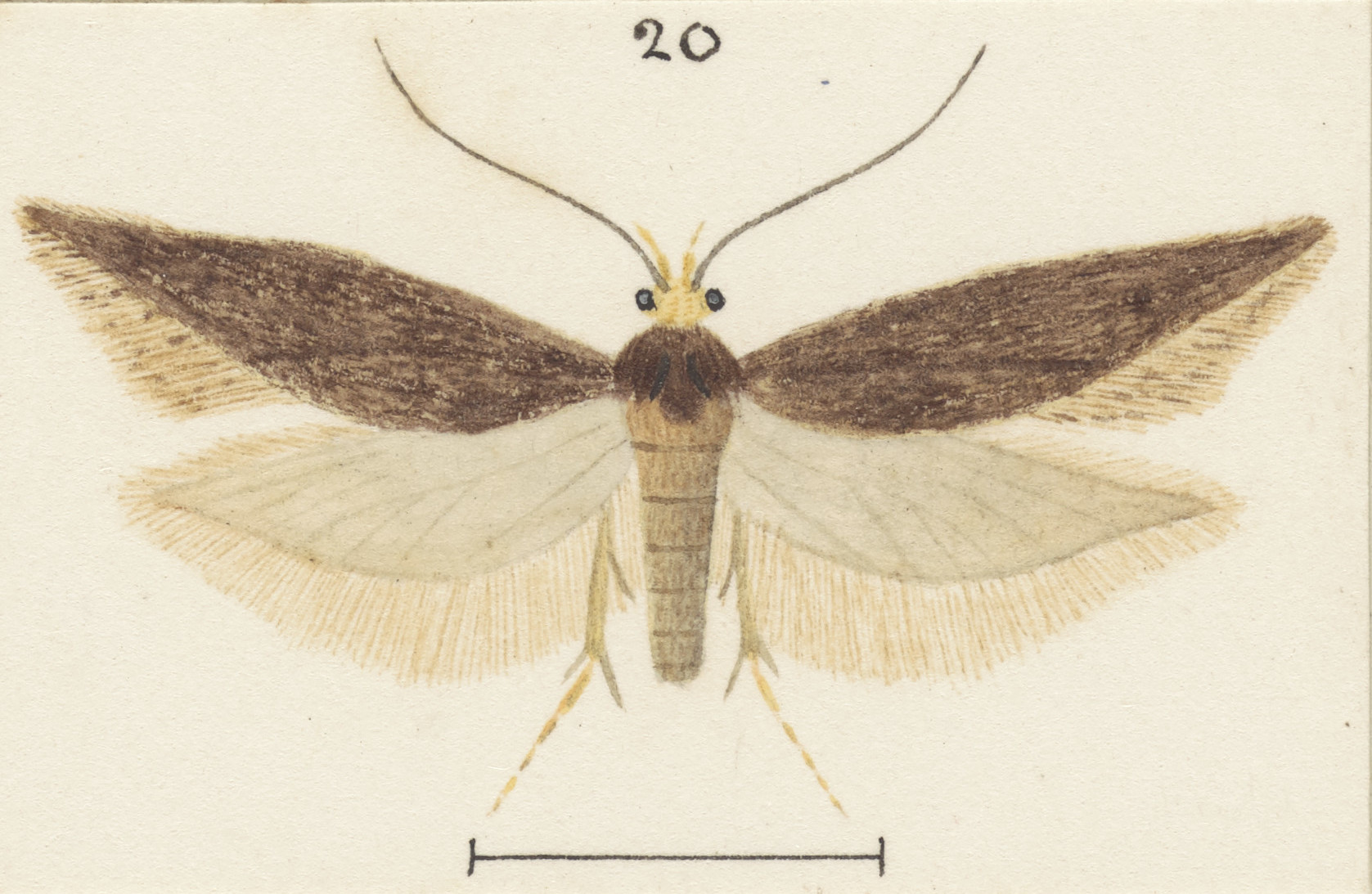

Scientific classification
- Domain: Eukaryota
- Kingdom: Animalia
- Phylum: Arthropoda
- Class: Insecta
- Order: Lepidoptera
- Family: Gelechiidae
- Genus: Kiwaia
- Species: K. hippeis

Binomial name
- Kiwaia hippeis (Meyrick, 1901)

Synonyms
- Gelechia hippeis Meyrick, 1901; Phthorimaha hippeis (Meyrick, 1901)

= Kiwaia hippeis =

Species of moth

Kiwaia hippeis is a moth in the family Gelechiidae. This species was first described by Edward Meyrick in 1901. It is endemic to New Zealand and has been collected in Christchurch. Adults of this species are on the wing in December and are attracted to light.

== Taxonomy ==
This species was first described by Edward Meyrick in 1901 using two specimens collected by R. W. Fereday in Christchurch and named Gelechia hippeis. George Hudson discussed and illustrated this species in 1928 in his book The butterflies and moths of New Zealand under the name Phthorimaha hippeis. In January 1988 Klaus Sattler placed this species within the genus Kiwaia. This placement was followed by J. S. Dugdale later in 1988. The female lectotype specimen is held at the Canterbury Museum.

== Distribution ==
This species is endemic to New Zealand and has been collected in Christchurch.

== Description ==
Meyrick originally described the species as follows:

♂♀ 15-16 m.m. Head ochreous-white. Palpi ochreous-white, basal joint and a subapical band of terminal joint dark fuscous. Antennae fuscous. Thorax dark purplish-fuscous. Abdomen light ochreous. Fore wings elongate-lanceolate, acutely pointed; rather dark purplish-bronzy-fuscous; stigmata darker, obscurely defined, first discal obliquely beyond plical and near second : cilia pale whitish-ochreous, towards base bronzy-tinged. Hindwings with veins 6 and 7 nearly parallel; whitish-grey; cilia pale whitish-ochreous.

== Behaviour ==
Adults of this species are on the wing in December and are attracted to light.
