= Kiwaia matermea =

Scientific classification
- Kingdom: Animalia
- Phylum: Arthropoda
- Clade: Pancrustacea
- Class: Insecta
- Order: Lepidoptera
- Family: Gelechiidae
- Genus: Kiwaia
- Species: K. matermea

Binomial name
- Kiwaia matermea (Povolný, 1974)

Synonyms
- Empista (Zeempista) matermea Povolný, 1974

Species of moth

Kiwaia matermea is a moth in the family Gelechiidae. It was described by Povolný in 1974. It is found in New Zealand.
