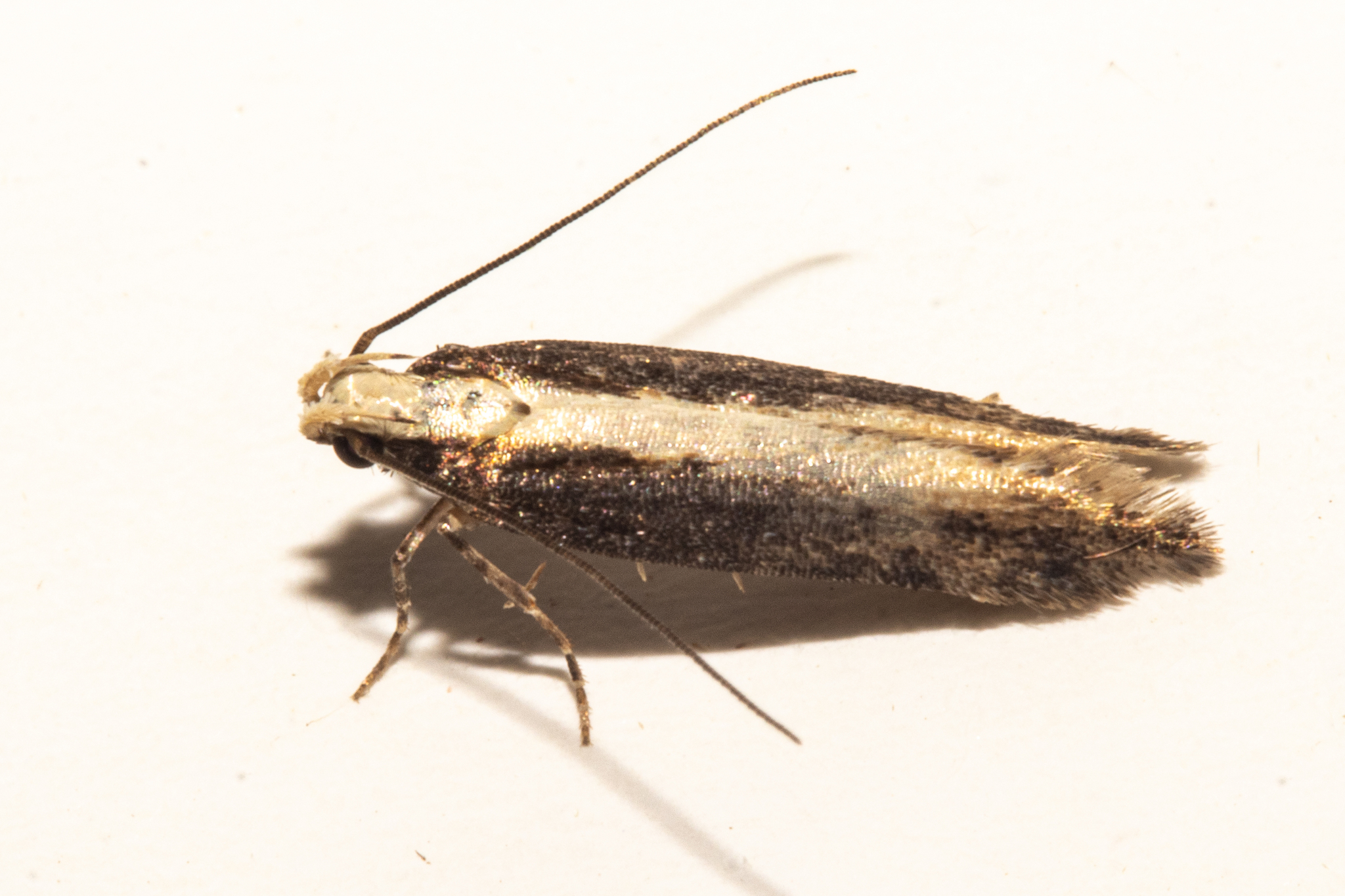

Scientific classification
- Kingdom: Animalia
- Phylum: Arthropoda
- Clade: Pancrustacea
- Class: Insecta
- Order: Lepidoptera
- Family: Gelechiidae
- Genus: Kiwaia
- Species: K. parapleura

Binomial name
- Kiwaia parapleura (Meyrick, 1885)

Synonyms
- Gelechia parapleura Meyrick, 1885

= Kiwaia parapleura =

Species of moth endemic to New Zealand

Kiwaia parapleura is a moth in the family Gelechiidae. It was first described by Edward Meyrick in 1885. This species is endemic to New Zealand and is found in the North Island in the Gisborne area and in the South Island in the Fiordland, Canterbury, Otago and Southland regions. The species inhabits tussock grassland and has also been observed amongst the herb layer in Kunzea ericoides stands. Adults are on the wing from December until March. K. parapleura is unlikely to be of any economic significance.

== Taxonomy ==
This species was first described by Edward Meyrick in 1885 and originally named Gelechia parapleura. In 1886 Meyrick gave a fuller description of the species. In 1927 Alfred Philpott examined the male genitalia of this species. George Hudson discussed and illustrated this species under that name in his 1928 book The butterflies and moths of New Zealand. In 1987 Klaus Slattler placed this species in the genus Kiwaia. In 1988 John S. Dugdale agreed with this placement. The male lectotype, collected by Meyrick in the Bealey River bed in January, is held at the Natural History Museum, London.

== Description ==
Illustration by Hudson.

Meyrick described this species as follows:

Male, female. — 16 mm. Head and palpi ochreous-white, apex of palpi black. Antennae dark fuscous. Thorax dark purplish-fuscous, with a broad central ochreous-white stripe. Abdomen ochreous-whitish. Legs dark fuscous, apex of joints and posterior pair ochreous-whitish. Forewings elongate, narrow, acutely pointed ; dark fuscous ; a broad pale whitish-ochreous streak along inner margin from base to apex, occupying nearly half of wing ; three indistinct small black discal spots, sometimes obsolete, first in middle, second on lower margin of dark fuscous portion very obliquely before first, third in disc beyond middle : cilia pale whitish-ochreous, on costa mixed with dark fuscous. Hindwings with apex tolerably acute, hindmargin gently sinuate ; whitish-grey ; cilia ochreous-whitish.

This species can be separated from similar species by the straight longitudinal separation of the dark costal and light dorsal halves of the forewings, and the colour of thorax.

== Distribution ==
This species is endemic to New Zealand. This species has been observed in the North Island in the Gisborne area and in the South Island in the Fiordland, Canterbury, Otago and Southland regions.

== Habitat ==
This species has been observed in tussock grasslands and amongst herb layer in Kunzea ericoides stands.

== Behaviour ==
Adults of this species have been observed on the wing from December to March. The adult moths are regarded as "light fliers".

== Human interactions ==
This species is unlikely to have any economic significance.
