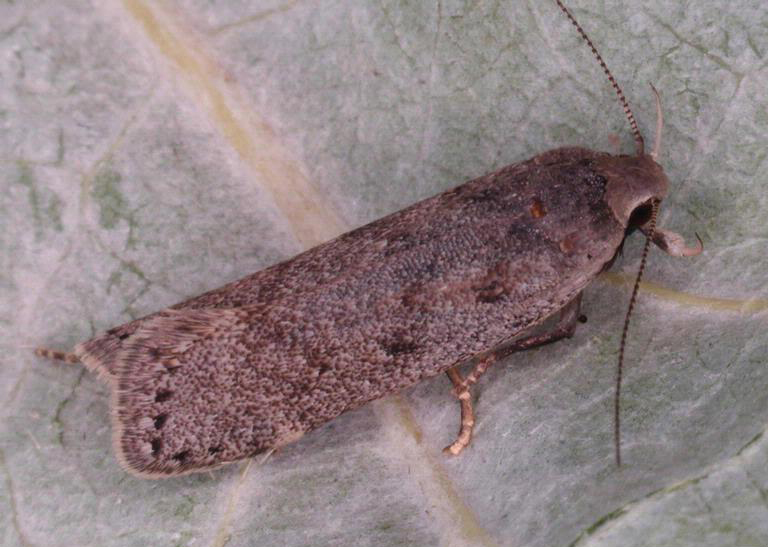

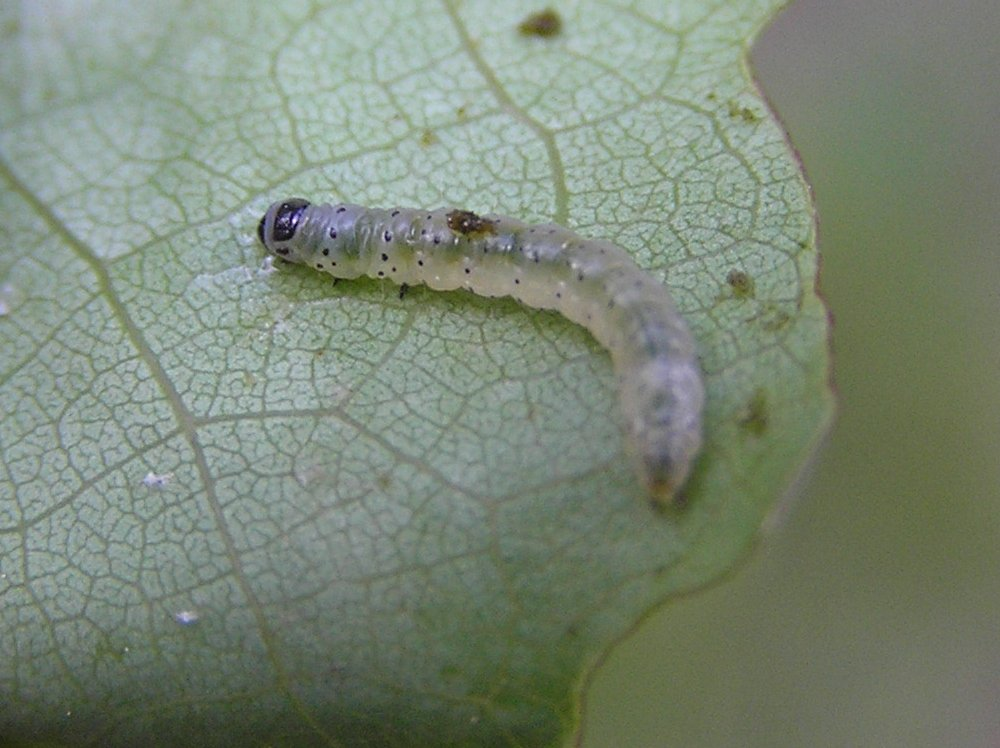

Scientific classification
- Kingdom: Animalia
- Phylum: Arthropoda
- Clade: Pancrustacea
- Class: Insecta
- Order: Lepidoptera
- Family: Gelechiidae
- Genus: Anacampsis
- Species: A. populella

Binomial name
- Anacampsis populella (Clerck, 1759)

Synonyms
- Phalaena populella Clerck, 1759; Tinea tremella Denis & Schiffermüller, 1775; Pyralis boeberana Fabricius, 1787; Recurvaria populi Haworth, 1828; Anacampsis laticinctella Stephens, 1834; Anacampsis tremulella Duponchel, 1839; Tachyptilia lugens Caradja, 1920; Tachyptilia sachalinensis Matsumura, 1931; Anacampsis ambronella Meder, 1934; Tachyptilia populella fuscatella Bentinck, 1934; Tachyptilia populella ab. crepusculella Skala, 1936

= Anacampsis populella =

Species of moth

Anacampsis populella is a moth of the family Gelechiidae, which is native to Europe and has been accidentally introduced to North America. It was first described in 1759 by Carl Alexander Clerck, a Swedish entomologist. The type specimen is from Sweden. The foodplants of the larvae are poplars (Populus species) and willows (Salix species).

== Life cycle ==
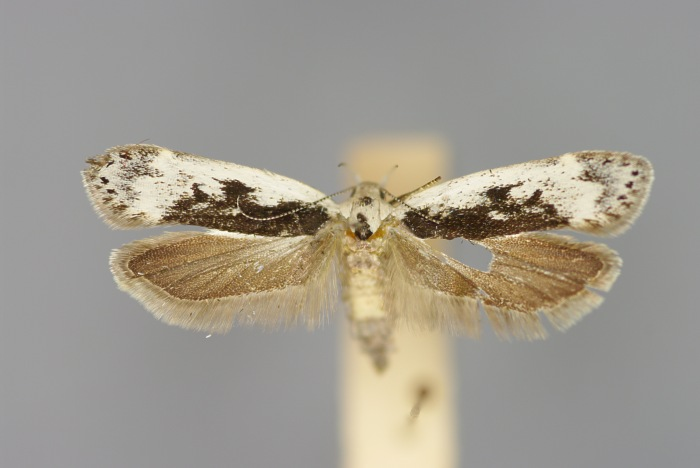

The wingspan is 14–19 mm, the colours are variable and the sexes are similar. Abdomen with segments 2-4 often ochreous-yellow. Forewings are whitish, more or less irrorated with black or dark grey, usually palest towards base of costa; costal edge sometimes yellowish-tinged; sometimes a large black patch occupying dorsal 2/3 from base to near tornus stigmata blackish, often concealed; a whitish obtusely angulated fascia at 3/4, indented above angle, sometimes indistinct terminal black dots. Hindwings over 1, rather dark grey. The larva is pale grey-greenish or yellowish; dots black; head and plate of 2 black. A similar species, A. blattariella is also a variable species and can only be told apart from A. populella by genitalia dissection.

They are on wing from June to September, depending on the location, and can be found on tree trunks, dislodged from foliage or swept from creeping willow (Salix repens). They also come to light.

=== Ovum ===
Eggs are laid on various species of poplar including aspen (Populus tremula) and willows, such as goat willow (Salix caprea) and white willow (Salix alba).

=== Larva ===
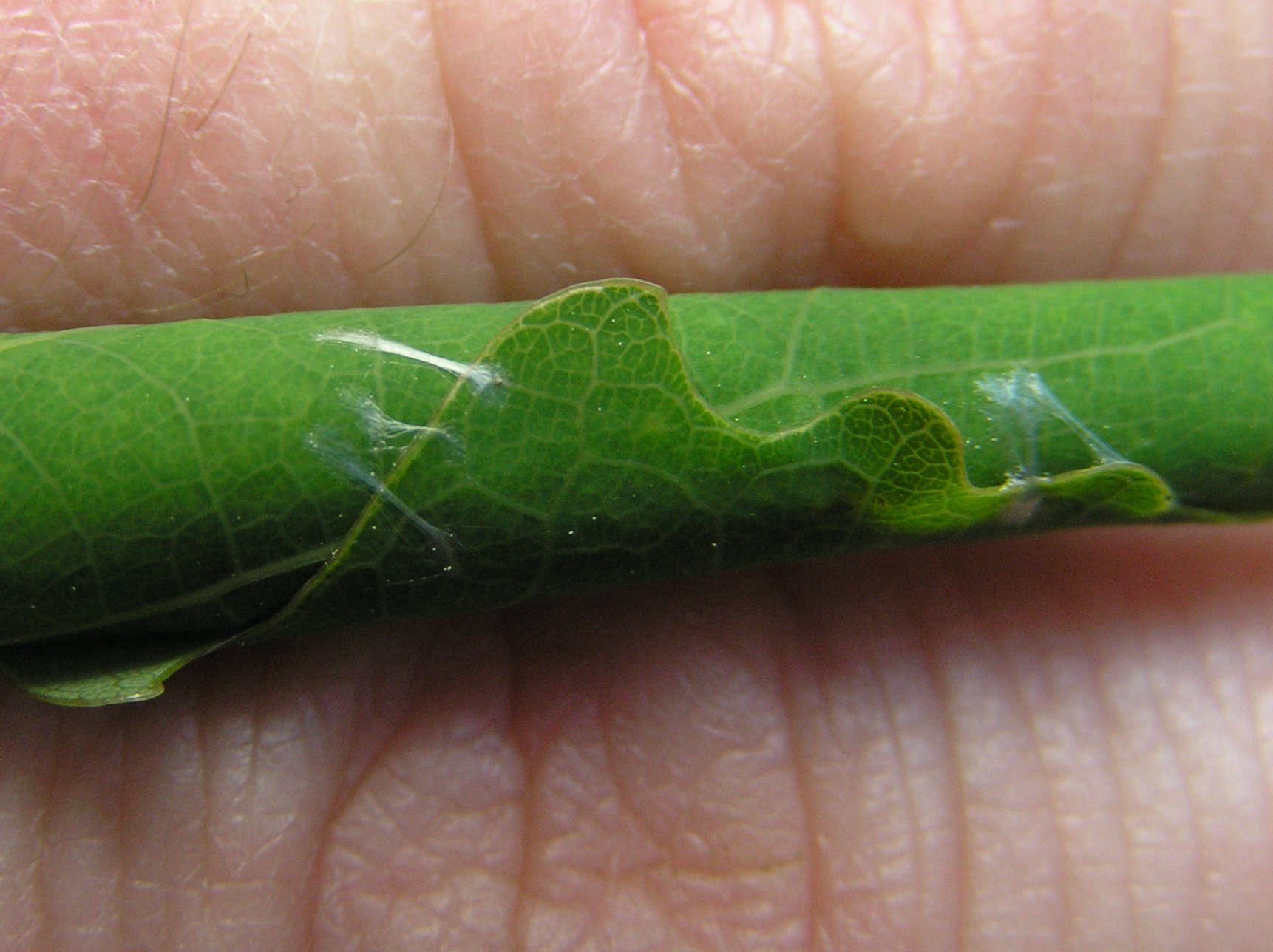
Rolled leaf in which the larva feeds

Larvae can be found from mid-April to June. The head and divided prothoracic plate are black and the body is greyish green with round black pinacula which are easily seen, while the anal plate is brownish. The larva rolls a leaf into a tube, held together with silken strands which can be seen on the edges of the roll. On creeping willow, due to their small size several leaves are spun around the central shoot, starting a short distance below the tip and working upwards. Larvae of A. temerella also roll leaves around creeping willow.

=== Pupa ===
Pupation takes place in a cocoon within a rolled leaf of the foodplant.

== Distribution ==
The moth is found in most of Europe and has been accidentally introduced to North America.
