= Anacampsis rhoifructella =

Scientific classification
- Kingdom: Animalia
- Phylum: Arthropoda
- Clade: Pancrustacea
- Class: Insecta
- Order: Lepidoptera
- Family: Gelechiidae
- Genus: Anacampsis
- Species: A. rhoifructella

Binomial name
- Anacampsis rhoifructella (Clemens, 1861)

Synonyms
- Gelechia rhoifructella Clemens, 1861

Species of moth

Anacampsis rhoifructella is a moth of the family Gelechiidae. It was described by James Brackenridge Clemens in 1861. It is found in North America, where it has been recorded from the eastern United States and south-eastern Canada. The habitat consists of deciduous forests.

Adult are very similar to Anacampsis consonella, but can be distinguished on the basis of phenology, appearance of the mature larva, and genital morphology.

The larvae feed on Viburnum species.
