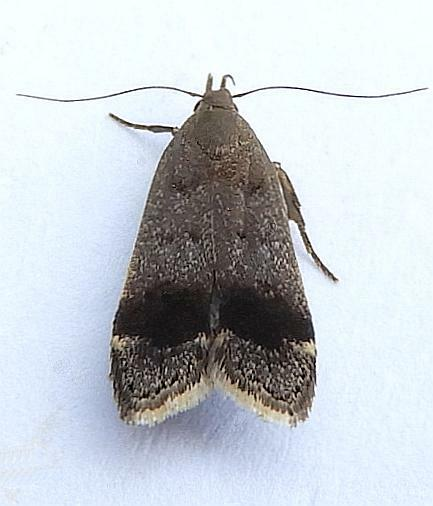

Scientific classification
- Kingdom: Animalia
- Phylum: Arthropoda
- Clade: Pancrustacea
- Class: Insecta
- Order: Lepidoptera
- Family: Gelechiidae
- Genus: Anacampsis
- Species: A. fragariella

Binomial name
- Anacampsis fragariella Busck, 1904

= Anacampsis fragariella =

Species of moth

Anacampsis fragariella is a species of moth in the family Gelechiidae. It was first described by August Busck in 1904. It is found in North America, where it has been recorded from Illinois, Indiana, Massachusetts, Michigan and Washington.

== Description ==
The wingspan is about 16 mm. The forewings are light whitish brown, the colour somewhat deeper toward the tip than at the base. There is a broad, ill-defined darker, mahogany-brown fascia at the apical third. The hindwings are dark fuscous.

The larvae feed on Fragaria species.
