= Anacampsis cornifer =

Scientific classification
- Kingdom: Animalia
- Phylum: Arthropoda
- Clade: Pancrustacea
- Class: Insecta
- Order: Lepidoptera
- Family: Gelechiidae
- Genus: Anacampsis
- Species: A. cornifer

Binomial name
- Anacampsis cornifer Walsingham, 1897

Species of moth

Anacampsis cornifer is a moth of the family Gelechiidae. It was described by Thomas de Grey, in 1897. It is found in the West Indies (St. Croix and St. Thomas).

The wingspan is 10–11 mm. The forewings are greyish ochreous, indistinctly speckled with fuscous, a black dot at the extreme base of the costa, two fuscous dots in the fold, two on the discal cell, a slight fuscous costal shade above the end of the cell, followed by a pale ochreous spot, a few fuscous scales lying around the apex and termen. There is a slight greyish suffusion across the middle of the wing, and beyond it from the pale costal spot a curved band, paler than the ground-colour, is indistinctly traceable across the wing. The hindwings are brownish grey.

The larvae have been recorded feeding on Croton flavens.
