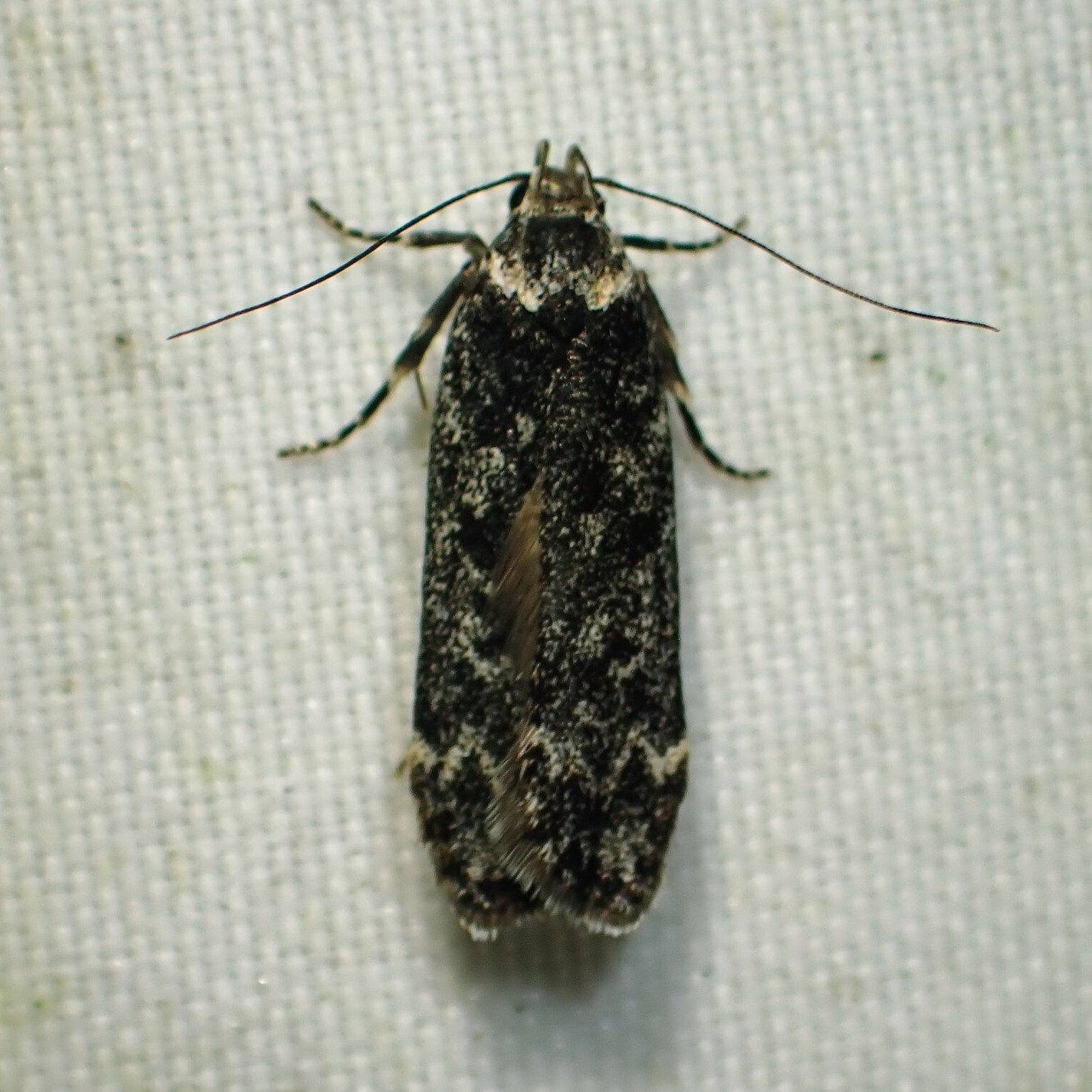

Scientific classification
- Kingdom: Animalia
- Phylum: Arthropoda
- Clade: Pancrustacea
- Class: Insecta
- Order: Lepidoptera
- Family: Gelechiidae
- Genus: Anacampsis
- Species: A. niveopulvella

Binomial name
- Anacampsis niveopulvella (Chambers, 1875)

Synonyms
- Gelechia niveopulvella Chambers, 1875

= Anacampsis niveopulvella =

Species of moth

Anacampsis niveopulvella, commonly known as the pale-headed aspen leafroller moth, is a species of moth in the family Gelechiidae. It was first described by Vactor Tousey Chambers in 1875. It is found in North America, where it has been recorded from Alberta, Arizona, British Columbia, California, Indiana, Maine, Manitoba and Ontario.

== Description ==
The wingspan is about 12 mm. The forewings are very dark brown, with a white spot on the disc before the middle and two or three small ones behind the middle, and an irregular white fascia posteriorly angulated at the beginning of the cilia. Under the lens, the wing appears to be pretty densely dusted with white and the spots are only aggregations of the dusting.

== Behaviour and ecology ==
The larvae feed on Salix and Populus species.
