= Anacampsis tephriasella =

Scientific classification
- Kingdom: Animalia
- Phylum: Arthropoda
- Clade: Pancrustacea
- Class: Insecta
- Order: Lepidoptera
- Family: Gelechiidae
- Genus: Anacampsis
- Species: A. tephriasella

Binomial name
- Anacampsis tephriasella (Chambers, 1872)

Synonyms
- Gelechia tephriasella Chambers, 1872

Species of moth

Anacampsis tephriasella is a moth of the family Gelechiidae. It was described by Vactor Tousey Chambers in 1872. It is found in North America, where it has been recorded from Illinois, Kentucky and Maine.

The forewings are pale gray, about equally intermixed with white, becoming gradually darker gray and fuscous towards the tip, each of the darker scales tipped with white. There is a small, very oblique white streak or spot on the costa, just behind the middle, and at the beginning of the costal cilia the wing is crossed by a narrow white fascia. An indistinct fuscous hinder marginal line or row of spots is found at the base of the cilia.
