= Anacampsis quinquepunctella =

Scientific classification
- Kingdom: Animalia
- Phylum: Arthropoda
- Clade: Pancrustacea
- Class: Insecta
- Order: Lepidoptera
- Family: Gelechiidae
- Genus: Anacampsis
- Species: A. quinquepunctella

Binomial name
- Anacampsis quinquepunctella Walsingham, 1897

Species of moth

Anacampsis quinquepunctella is a moth of the family Gelechiidae. It was described by Thomas de Grey in 1897. It is found in the West Indies (Grenada) and Mexico.

The wingspan is 10–12 mm. The forewings are dull fawn-grey, with five greyish-fuscous spots. One above and one beneath the fold at one-fourth, one on the fold at its outer third with another on the cell a little above and beyond it and a small one at the end of the cell. Half-way between this and the apex is an outwardly angulated, pale cinereous, narrow fascia. A small dark fuscous spot lies at the extreme base of the costa. The hindwings are almost concolorous with the forewings, but with a slight brownish-grey tinge.
