= Anacampsis lithodelta =

Scientific classification
- Kingdom: Animalia
- Phylum: Arthropoda
- Clade: Pancrustacea
- Class: Insecta
- Order: Lepidoptera
- Family: Gelechiidae
- Genus: Anacampsis
- Species: A. lithodelta

Binomial name
- Anacampsis lithodelta Meyrick, 1922

Species of moth

Anacampsis lithodelta is a moth of the family Gelechiidae. It was described by Edward Meyrick in 1922. It is found in Peru.

== Description ==
The wingspan is about 10 mm. The forewings are whitish-grey-ochreous with a large blackish triangular blotch extending over the median third of the costa and reaching more than half across the wing. There are undefined slight transverse marks of dark grey irroration beyond the apex of this and above the middle of the dorsum, as well as a fine angulated line of dark grey irroration from a blackish dot on the costa at three-fourths to the tornus. The terminal area beyond this is brownish-tinged and there is a blackish marginal line around the apex and termen. The hindwings are dark grey.
