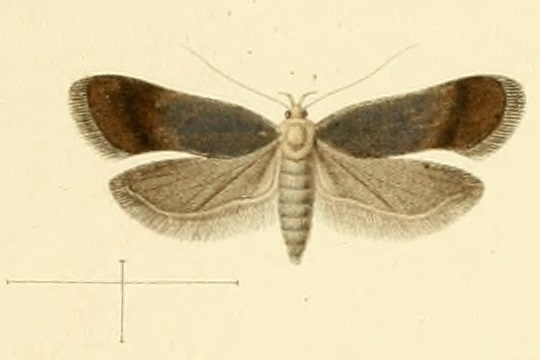

Scientific classification
- Kingdom: Animalia
- Phylum: Arthropoda
- Clade: Pancrustacea
- Class: Insecta
- Order: Lepidoptera
- Family: Gelechiidae
- Genus: Anacampsis
- Species: A. hirsutella

Binomial name
- Anacampsis hirsutella (Constant, 1885)

Synonyms
- Tachyptilia hirsutella Constant, 1885

= Anacampsis hirsutella =

Species of moth

Anacampsis hirsutella is a moth of the family Gelechiidae. It is found in Austria, Switzerland, France and Italy.

The wingspan is about 14 mm.
