= Anacampsis ursula =

Scientific classification
- Kingdom: Animalia
- Phylum: Arthropoda
- Clade: Pancrustacea
- Class: Insecta
- Order: Lepidoptera
- Family: Gelechiidae
- Genus: Anacampsis
- Species: A. ursula

Binomial name
- Anacampsis ursula Walsingham, 1910

Species of moth

Anacampsis ursula is a moth of the family Gelechiidae. It was found by Thomas de Grey in 1910. It is found in Mexico (Morelos).

The wingspan is about 18 mm. The forewings are mouse-grey, sprinkled with greyish fuscous scales, a minute fuscous spot at the extreme base of the costa. From the commencement of the costal cilia an indistinct narrow pale cinereous and somewhat sinuate band, curving outward to below the middle, reverts to the dorsum before the tornus, beyond it the apical and terminal space is cupreous, with a slight iridescent lustre. The hindwings are dark brown, somewhat thinly scaled toward the base.
