= Anacampsis paltodoriella =

Scientific classification
- Kingdom: Animalia
- Phylum: Arthropoda
- Clade: Pancrustacea
- Class: Insecta
- Order: Lepidoptera
- Family: Gelechiidae
- Genus: Anacampsis
- Species: A. paltodoriella

Binomial name
- Anacampsis paltodoriella Busck, 1903

Species of moth

Anacampsis paltodoriella is a moth of the family Gelechiidae. It was described by August Busck in 1903. It is found in North America, where it has been recorded from California, Arizona, New Mexico and Texas.

The wingspan is about 13 mm. The forewings are drab colored, lightest nearly white along the costa, gradually darker toward the dorsal edge. In the middle of the cell is a small indistinct blackish dot, a similar one nearer the base on the fold and a third at the end of the cell. At the apical fourth is an oblique narrow white streak directed outward and nearly meeting a similar but curved dorsal streak directed upward and outward. Both streaks are slightly edged with black anteriorly. The area between the dorsal streak and the edge of the wing is white, mottled finely with black, each scale being tipped with black. The hindwings are dark purplish fuscous.
