= Anacampsis comparanda =

Scientific classification
- Kingdom: Animalia
- Phylum: Arthropoda
- Clade: Pancrustacea
- Class: Insecta
- Order: Lepidoptera
- Family: Gelechiidae
- Genus: Anacampsis
- Species: A. comparanda

Binomial name
- Anacampsis comparanda (Meyrick, 1929)

Synonyms
- Compsolechia comparanda Meyrick, 1929

Species of moth

Anacampsis comparanda is a moth of the family Gelechiidae. It was described by Edward Meyrick in 1929. It is found in North America, where it has been recorded from Arizona and Texas.

The wingspan is 13–14 mm.
