= Anacampsis innocuella =

Scientific classification
- Kingdom: Animalia
- Phylum: Arthropoda
- Clade: Pancrustacea
- Class: Insecta
- Order: Lepidoptera
- Family: Gelechiidae
- Genus: Anacampsis
- Species: A. innocuella

Binomial name
- Anacampsis innocuella (Zeller, 1873)

Synonyms
- Gelechia (Tachyptilia) innocuella Zeller, 1873

Species of moth

Anacampsis innocuella, the dark-headed aspen leafroller moth, is a moth of the family Gelechiidae. It was described by Philipp Christoph Zeller in 1873. It is found in North America, where it has been recorded from Alabama, British Columbia, Illinois, Indiana, Maine, Mississippi, New York, Nova Scotia, Ohio, Oklahoma, Ontario, Quebec and Vermont.

The wingspan is 18–22 mm. Adults are ash grey with a pale wavy transverse line on the forewings.

The larvae feed on Populus, Salix and Prunus species, rolling the leaves of their host plant.
