= Anacampsis peloptila =

Scientific classification
- Kingdom: Animalia
- Phylum: Arthropoda
- Clade: Pancrustacea
- Class: Insecta
- Order: Lepidoptera
- Family: Gelechiidae
- Genus: Anacampsis
- Species: A. peloptila

Binomial name
- Anacampsis peloptila (Meyrick, 1914)

Synonyms
- Agriastis peloptila Meyrick, 1914

Species of moth

Anacampsis peloptila is a moth of the family Gelechiidae. It was described by Edward Meyrick in 1914. It is found in Guyana.

The wingspan is 14–15 mm. The forewings are ochreous irregularly sprinkled or mixed with whitish, with some dark fuscous scales and a dark brown dot near the base in the middle, and an erect mark on the base of the dorsum. There are ochreous-brown or dark fuscous spots on the costa at one-fifth, before the middle, and before the subterminal line, the two latter more or less elongate. An oblique dark brown mark is found on the fold beneath the first of these, and a spot in the disc before it. There are large subdorsal dark brown tufts beneath each of the costal spots and a somewhat elongate dark brown spot just beneath the second costal, partially confluent with it. The stigmata are obscure, rather dark fuscous, the discal approximated, the plical obliquely before the first discal. There is a whitish subterminal line from three-fourths of the costa to the tornus, sinuate inwards on the upper half, preceded in the disc by an indistinct dark fuscous dash. Two or three indistinct dark fuscous marginal dots are found around the apex. The hindwings are dark fuscous.
