= Anacampsis perquisita =

Scientific classification
- Kingdom: Animalia
- Phylum: Arthropoda
- Clade: Pancrustacea
- Class: Insecta
- Order: Lepidoptera
- Family: Gelechiidae
- Genus: Anacampsis
- Species: A. perquisita

Binomial name
- Anacampsis perquisita Meyrick, 1922

Species of moth

Anacampsis perquisita is a moth of the family Gelechiidae. It was described by Edward Meyrick in 1922. It is found in Brazil (Para).

The wingspan is about 8 mm. The forewings are dark grey irregularly irrorated whitish and with blackish spots on the costa at the base and one-fifth, on the dorsum at the base, and crossing the fold at one-fourth. There is an elongate blackish spot on the middle of the costa. The stigmata form roundish dark fuscous spots, the plical beneath the first discal. A sinuate whitish line is found from three-fourths of the costa to the dorsum before the tornus, preceded on the costa by an elongate blackish spot. There are one or two dark fuscous dots on the costa beyond this, and one on the termen beneath the apex. The hindwings are dark grey.
