= Anacampsis argyrothamniella =

Scientific classification
- Kingdom: Animalia
- Phylum: Arthropoda
- Clade: Pancrustacea
- Class: Insecta
- Order: Lepidoptera
- Family: Gelechiidae
- Genus: Anacampsis
- Species: A. argyrothamniella

Binomial name
- Anacampsis argyrothamniella Busck, 1900

Species of moth

Anacampsis argyrothamniella is a moth of the family Gelechiidae. It was described by August Busck in 1900. It is found in North America, where it has been recorded from Florida and Georgia.

The wingspan is about 16 mm. The forewings are stone grey with scattered black atoms. There are three white dots on the disc, one at the middle of the wing below the fold and two above the fold farther outward. Just before the apex is an ill-defined, but quite distinct, outwardly angulated, white fascia.

The larvae feed on Argyrothamnia blodgettii, tying the leaves of their host plant.
