= Anacampsis pomaceella =

Scientific classification
- Kingdom: Animalia
- Phylum: Arthropoda
- Clade: Pancrustacea
- Class: Insecta
- Order: Lepidoptera
- Family: Gelechiidae
- Genus: Anacampsis
- Species: A. pomaceella

Binomial name
- Anacampsis pomaceella (Walker, 1864)

Synonyms
- Gelechia pomaceella Walker, 1864

Species of moth

Anacampsis pomaceella is a moth of the family Gelechiidae. It was described by Francis Walker in 1864. It is found in Amazonas, Brazil.

Adults are apple green, the forewings with four black costal marks, the first mark basal, the third and fourth triangular, larger than the first and than the second. There is a white bent transverse line extending from the fourth mark to the interior angle and the marginal points are black and minute. The hindwings are dark cupreous.
