= Anacampsis primigenia =

Scientific classification
- Kingdom: Animalia
- Phylum: Arthropoda
- Clade: Pancrustacea
- Class: Insecta
- Order: Lepidoptera
- Family: Gelechiidae
- Genus: Anacampsis
- Species: A. primigenia

Binomial name
- Anacampsis primigenia Meyrick, 1918

Species of moth

Anacampsis primigenia is a moth of the family Gelechiidae. It was described by Edward Meyrick in 1918. It is found in Ecuador, Colombia and on the Galapagos Islands.

The wingspan is 14–16 mm. The forewings are grey, sometimes finely sprinkled whitish, with scattered black specks and with a small black spot on the base of the costa, as well as a cloudy blackish dot or oblique mark above or crossing the fold at one-fourth. There is a cloudy dark dot on the dorsum at one-fifth. The stigmata are cloudy and blackish or dark grey, the plical rather obliquely before the first discal. There is an indistinct pale or whitish obtusely angulated shade from three-fourths of the costa to the dorsum before the tornus, preceded on the costa by some dark suffusion. There are also marginal blackish dots or marks around the posterior part of the costa and termen. The hindwings are rather dark grey, lighter in the disc anteriorly.

The larvae feed on Croton scouleri and Exedeconus miersii.
