= Anacampsis rhabdodes =

Scientific classification
- Kingdom: Animalia
- Phylum: Arthropoda
- Clade: Pancrustacea
- Class: Insecta
- Order: Lepidoptera
- Family: Gelechiidae
- Genus: Anacampsis
- Species: A. rhabdodes

Binomial name
- Anacampsis rhabdodes Walsingham, 1910

Species of moth

Anacampsis rhabdodes is a moth of the family Gelechiidae. It was described by Thomas de Grey in 1910. It is found in Mexico (Tabasco).

The wingspan is about 13 mm. The forewings are pale olivaceous ochreous, transversely and narrowly striate with lines of dark fuscous scales beyond the base to the end of the cell, a minute blackish dot at the extreme base of the costa, a triangular dark fuscous costal shade-spot, before the costal cilia, is followed by a pale cinereous sinuate line, crossing the wing to the tornus. A few fuscous dots surround the apex and termen at the base of the pale brownish ochreous cilia. The hindwings are greyish brown.
