= Anacampsis lacteusochrella =

Scientific classification
- Kingdom: Animalia
- Phylum: Arthropoda
- Clade: Pancrustacea
- Class: Insecta
- Order: Lepidoptera
- Family: Gelechiidae
- Genus: Anacampsis
- Species: A. lacteusochrella

Binomial name
- Anacampsis lacteusochrella (Chambers, 1875)

Synonyms
- Gelechia lacteusochrella Chambers, 1875; Compsolechia lacteochrella Meyrick, 1925

Species of moth

Anacampsis lacteusochrella is a moth of the family Gelechiidae. It was described by Vactor Tousey Chambers in 1875. It is found in North America, where it has been recorded from California.

Adults are creamy white or white very faintly suffused with ochreous, sparsely flecked with brown upon the forewings, which become towards the tip, suffused with greyish, or purplish brown and ochreous, so that a white costal streak at the beginning of the cilia may be distinguished from the surrounding part of the wing.
