= Anacampsis conistica =

Scientific classification
- Kingdom: Animalia
- Phylum: Arthropoda
- Clade: Pancrustacea
- Class: Insecta
- Order: Lepidoptera
- Family: Gelechiidae
- Genus: Anacampsis
- Species: A. conistica

Binomial name
- Anacampsis conistica Walsingham, 1910

Species of moth

Anacampsis conistica is a moth of the family Gelechiidae. It was described by Thomas de Grey, 6th Baron Walsingham, in 1910. It is found in Mexico (Sonora, Durango).

The wingspan is 14–15 mm. The forewings are brownish cinereous, much suffused with fuscous, becoming tawny towards the apex and termen, a small black spot at the extreme base of the costa. There are four very indistinct fuscous spots, two on the fold, and two on the cell, of which the first discal is beyond the second plical. A dull brownish ochreous spot, at the commencement of the costal cilia, is connected with an even more obscure opposite dorsal spot by a scarcely distinguishable line of pale scales, outwardly bowed among the fuscous suffusion. A few blackish scale-spots are found around the apex and termen, at the base of the greyish fuscous cilia which are minutely sprinkled along their middle with whitish cinereous, and faintly tipped with brownish ochreous. The apex is not greatly depressed, but somewhat obtuse. The hindwings are greyish brown.
