= Anacampsis cosmia =

Scientific classification
- Kingdom: Animalia
- Phylum: Arthropoda
- Clade: Pancrustacea
- Class: Insecta
- Order: Lepidoptera
- Family: Gelechiidae
- Genus: Anacampsis
- Species: A. cosmia

Binomial name
- Anacampsis cosmia Meyrick, 1921

Species of moth

Anacampsis cosmia is a moth of the family Gelechiidae. It was described by Edward Meyrick in 1921. It is found in South Africa.

The wingspan is about 18 mm. The forewings are pale grey closely speckled with dark grey, with scattered black scales. The stigmata are moderate, cloudy and blackish-grey, the plical rather obliquely before the first discal, an additional spot midway between the first discal and the base. There are small cloudy ochreous-whitish opposite spots on the costa before three-fourths and the dorsum before the tornus, connected by a faint pale obtusely angulated shade. There are five or six black marginal dots around the apex and upper part of the termen. The hindwings are grey, suffused with darker on the veins and towards the apex and termen.
