= Anacampsis nonstrigella =

Scientific classification
- Kingdom: Animalia
- Phylum: Arthropoda
- Clade: Pancrustacea
- Class: Insecta
- Order: Lepidoptera
- Family: Gelechiidae
- Genus: Anacampsis
- Species: A. nonstrigella

Binomial name
- Anacampsis nonstrigella Busck, 1906

Species of moth

Anacampsis nonstrigella is a moth of the family Gelechiidae. It was described by August Busck in 1906. It is found in North America, where it has been recorded from Pennsylvania, Indiana, Kentucky and Maine.

The wingspan is about 15 mm (0.59 in). The basal two-thirds of the forewings are dark olive, the apical part deep blackish brown, with a few golden-brown scales just before the apex. The hindwings are dark purplish fuscous, with the dorsal cilia white.
