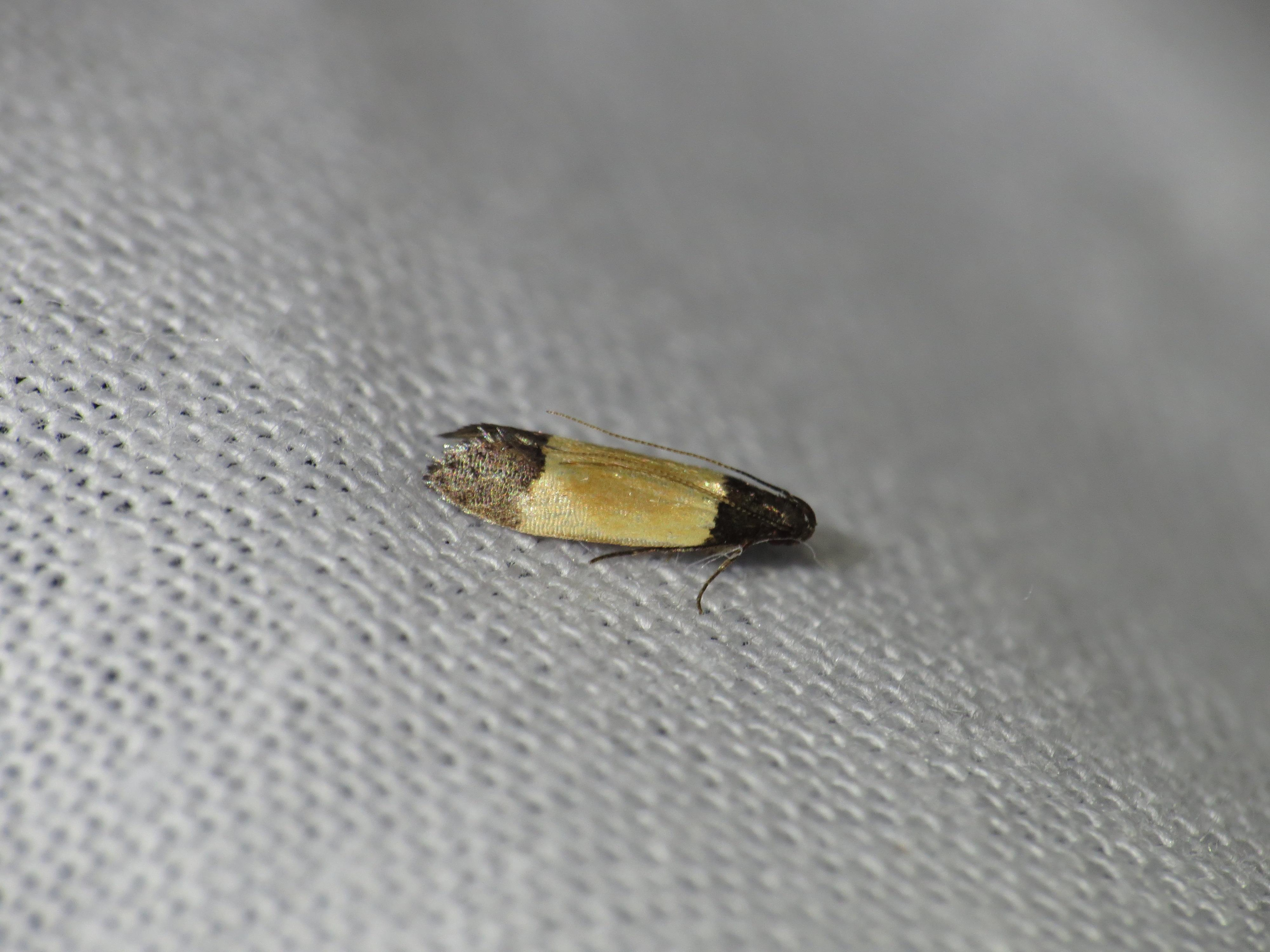

Scientific classification
- Kingdom: Animalia
- Phylum: Arthropoda
- Clade: Pancrustacea
- Class: Insecta
- Order: Lepidoptera
- Family: Gelechiidae
- Genus: Anacampsis
- Species: A. coverdalella

Binomial name
- Anacampsis coverdalella Kearfott, 1903

= Anacampsis coverdalella =

Coverdale's anacampsis

Species of moth

Anacampsis coverdalella, commonly called Coverdale's anacampsis, is a moth of the family Gelechiidae. It is found in the United States, where it has been recorded from Alabama, Arkansas, Florida, Georgia, Louisiana, Maryland, Mississippi, North Carolina, South Carolina, Tennessee, Texas and Virginia.

The wingspan is 10–11.5 mm. The base of the forewings, from the costa to the inner margin, is dark purplish-brown, while it is canary yellow from the base to the outer fourth. The outer fourth is the same as the base, with both division lines vertical from the costa to the inner margin, slightly serrate. The yellow colour along the costa is a shade paler than below the median line. The hindwings are fuscous.
