= Anacampsis triangularis =

Scientific classification
- Kingdom: Animalia
- Phylum: Arthropoda
- Clade: Pancrustacea
- Class: Insecta
- Order: Lepidoptera
- Family: Gelechiidae
- Genus: Anacampsis
- Species: A. triangularis

Binomial name
- Anacampsis triangularis Braun, 1923

Species of moth

Anacampsis triangularis is a moth of the family Gelechiidae. It was described by Annette Frances Braun in 1923. It is found in North America, where it has been recorded from southern California.

The wingspan is about 14 mm. The forewings are dull ocherous, the ground color of the forewings gradually deepening toward the apex to a reddish-ocherous color in the apical third. There is a sparse sprinkling of dark brown scales over the wing surface and in the paler cilia. The markings are dark brown and the extreme base of the costa is dark brown. There is also an elongate spot near the middle of the costa and a larger triangular spot at the apical third of the costa reaching one-fourth across the wing. A small spot is found beyond the middle of the cell and a little anterior to it in the fold is a similar spot. There is an irregular transverse brown line at the end of the cell and just above the end of the fold is a spot somewhat larger than the discal spot. Slight aggregates of brown scales are found in the interspaces around the apex. The hindwings are brownish gray, darker than the forewings.
