= Anacampsis phytomiella =

Scientific classification
- Kingdom: Animalia
- Phylum: Arthropoda
- Clade: Pancrustacea
- Class: Insecta
- Order: Lepidoptera
- Family: Gelechiidae
- Genus: Anacampsis
- Species: A. phytomiella

Binomial name
- Anacampsis phytomiella Busck, 1914

Species of moth

Anacampsis phytomiella is a moth of the family Gelechiidae. It was described by August Busck in 1914. It is found in Panama.

The wingspan is 18–19 mm. The forewings are dark green, mottled with light ochreous and blackish-brown scales. There is a black spot on the middle of the costal edge and at the apical third is a similar spot. From both of these run faint, irregular, darker green, zigzag fasciae across the wing outwardly narrowly edged with ochreous. Scattered irregularly over the wing are small tufts of blackish-brown, raised scales and around the apical and terminal edge is a subterminal row of black dots. The hindwings are dark blackish brown, darkest and nearly black towards the tip and with the costal edge above vein 8 silvery white.
