= Anacampsis poliombra =

Scientific classification
- Kingdom: Animalia
- Phylum: Arthropoda
- Clade: Pancrustacea
- Class: Insecta
- Order: Lepidoptera
- Family: Gelechiidae
- Genus: Anacampsis
- Species: A. poliombra

Binomial name
- Anacampsis poliombra Meyrick, 1922

Species of moth

Anacampsis poliombra is a moth of the family Gelechiidae. It was described by Edward Meyrick in 1922. It is found in Brazil (Amazonas).

The wingspan is about 10 mm. The forewings are grey, suffusedly irrorated white, with some scattered dark fuscous scales. There is an oblique mark of dark fuscous suffusion beneath the costa at one-fifth and an oblique suffused dark fuscous streak from the dorsum at one-fifth reaching more than half across the wing, containing a subdorsal tuft. The stigmata are blackish, with the plical beneath the first discal. There is a cloudy elongate dark fuscous spot on the middle of the costa and an irregular whitish line from three-fourths of the costa to the tornus, slightly angulated in the middle and somewhat incurved on the upper half, preceded by a fascia of dark fuscous suffusion which is broader on the lower half. An elongate spot of dark fuscous suffusion follows this above the angle and there are dark fuscous marginal dots around the apex. The hindwings are grey, darker posteriorly.
