= Anacampsis multinotata =

Scientific classification
- Kingdom: Animalia
- Phylum: Arthropoda
- Clade: Pancrustacea
- Class: Insecta
- Order: Lepidoptera
- Family: Gelechiidae
- Genus: Anacampsis
- Species: A. multinotata

Binomial name
- Anacampsis multinotata (Meyrick, 1918)

Synonyms
- Gelechia multinotata Meyrick, 1918

Species of moth

Anacampsis multinotata is a moth of the family Gelechiidae. It was described by Edward Meyrick in 1918. It is found in Guyana.

The wingspan is about 10 mm. The forewings are white, with the bases of the scales grey, forming a very fine transverse striation. There are small irregular dark fuscous spots on the base of the dorsum, and beneath the costa at one-fifth and four small irregular dark fuscous marks in a straight series from the middle of the costa to one-fifth of the dorsum, sometimes preceded by a fascia of grey suffusion or partially connected by a streak. The stigmata are dark fuscous, the plical obliquely before the first discal, sometimes indistinct, the second discal tending to form an oblique or bent mark. There is a somewhat angulated indistinct whitish subterminal line, anteriorly margined with more or less grey suffusion, indistinctly mixed dark fuscous on the costa and the dorsum, with beyond this some irregular dark fuscous suffusion towards the costa, the apex beneath this whitish-suffused. The hindwings are rather dark grey, lighter anteriorly.
