= Anacampsis scalata =

Scientific classification
- Kingdom: Animalia
- Phylum: Arthropoda
- Clade: Pancrustacea
- Class: Insecta
- Order: Lepidoptera
- Family: Gelechiidae
- Genus: Anacampsis
- Species: A. scalata

Binomial name
- Anacampsis scalata (Meyrick, 1914)

Synonyms
- Agriastis scalata Meyrick, 1914; Anacampsis caneodes Meyrick, 1922

Species of moth

Anacampsis scalata is a moth of the family Gelechiidae. It was described by Edward Meyrick in 1914. It is found in Guyana and Brazil (Para).

Anacampsis scalata has a wingspan of 12–14 mm. It has dark forewings, which are covered with white spots, with black basal dots on the costa and in the middle of the insect. There are three wedge-shaped blackish spots on the costa at one-fourth, the middle, and before the subterminal line. There is an oblique dark fuscous mark on the fold beneath the first of these, and a small round spot towards the costa before the second.

The stigmata are dark fuscous, the plical slightly before the first discal, the second discal larger. The subterminal line is somewhat whitish, from three-fourths of the costa to the tornus, forming a spot on the costa, sinuate inwards on the upper half, on the dorsum preceded by an undefined spot of dark brown suffusion. There are two distinct black dots on the costa towards the apex and termen beneath the apex, and sometimes two or three other smaller ones. The hindwings are dark grey, with the back anterior of the disc being lighter in color.
