= Anacampsis insularis =

Scientific classification
- Kingdom: Animalia
- Phylum: Arthropoda
- Clade: Pancrustacea
- Class: Insecta
- Order: Lepidoptera
- Family: Gelechiidae
- Genus: Anacampsis
- Species: A. insularis

Binomial name
- Anacampsis insularis Walsingham, 1897

Species of moth

Anacampsis insularis is a moth of the family Gelechiidae. It was described by Thomas de Grey in 1897. It is found in the West Indies (St. Thomas and Puerto Rico).

The wingspan is about 8 mm. The forewings are greyish fuscous, with dirty whitish costal blotches reaching nearly half across the wing, one elongate, oblique, before the middle and another smaller, not oblique, on the middle. A third is found before the apex nearly meeting at its lower extremity a smaller one arising from a little beyond the tornus. Some dark fuscous spots along the fold are connected by a dark line, and an irregular dark line along the outer part of the cell connects a small median spot with one a little below the apex. The hindwings are greyish fuscous.
