= Anacampsis nocturna =

Scientific classification
- Kingdom: Animalia
- Phylum: Arthropoda
- Clade: Pancrustacea
- Class: Insecta
- Order: Lepidoptera
- Family: Gelechiidae
- Genus: Anacampsis
- Species: A. nocturna

Binomial name
- Anacampsis nocturna (Meyrick, 1914)

Synonyms
- Agriastis nocturna Meyrick, 1914

Species of moth

Anacampsis nocturna is a moth of the family Gelechiidae. It was described by Edward Meyrick in 1914. It is found in Guyana.

The wingspan is about 12 mm. The forewings are dark fuscous, more or less irrorated with pale greyish-ochreous and with the markings obscure, formed by the absence of pale irroration. There is a subbasal dot in the middle, and an erect mark from the base of the dorsum. An irregular transverse line is found at one-fifth, angulated inwards beneath the costa and outwards in the middle. There are elongate spots on the costa before the middle and before the subterminal line, and an oval spot beneath the first of these partially confluent with it. The stigmata are moderate, with the discal approximated, the plical obliquely before the first discal. An obscure pale greyish-ochreous subterminal line is found from three-fourths of the costa to the tornus, sinuate inwards on the upper portion and outwards on the lower. There are also several dark marginal dots around the apical part of the costa and termen. The hindwings are dark fuscous.
