= Anacampsis lignaria =

Scientific classification
- Kingdom: Animalia
- Phylum: Arthropoda
- Clade: Pancrustacea
- Class: Insecta
- Order: Lepidoptera
- Family: Gelechiidae
- Genus: Anacampsis
- Species: A. lignaria

Binomial name
- Anacampsis lignaria (Meyrick, 1926)

Synonyms
- Compsolechia lignaria Meyrick, 1926

Species of moth

Anacampsis lignaria is a moth of the family Gelechiidae. It was described by Edward Meyrick in 1926. It is found in the Russian Far East.

The wingspan is 16–17 mm. The forewings are greyish-ochreous, or light brownish slightly speckled ochreous-whitish and with the costal edge ochreous-whitish except towards the extremities. The stigmata are cloudy and fuscous, the plical obliquely before the first discal, sometimes an additional spot midway between the plical and the base. There are faint ochreous-whitish dots on the costa at three-fourths and the tornus opposite, and sometimes a hardly traceable curved line of ochreous-whitish speckling joining these. The hindwings are grey.
