= Anacampsis languens =

Scientific classification
- Kingdom: Animalia
- Phylum: Arthropoda
- Clade: Pancrustacea
- Class: Insecta
- Order: Lepidoptera
- Family: Gelechiidae
- Genus: Anacampsis
- Species: A. languens

Binomial name
- Anacampsis languens Meyrick, 1918

Species of moth

Anacampsis languens is a moth of the family Gelechiidae. It was described by Edward Meyrick in 1918. It is found in Ecuador.

The wingspan is about 14 mm. The forewings are whitish-grey, irregularly sprinkled black and with a moderate blackish streak from the dorsum at one-fifth, reaching two-thirds across the wing. There is a small spot of black irroration in the disc at two-thirds and a suffused whitish double spot on the costa at three-fourths, preceded by a small spot of blackish suffusion. Two black dots are found on the upper part of the termen. The hindwings are light grey.
