= Anacampsis embrocha =

Scientific classification
- Kingdom: Animalia
- Phylum: Arthropoda
- Clade: Pancrustacea
- Class: Insecta
- Order: Lepidoptera
- Family: Gelechiidae
- Genus: Anacampsis
- Species: A. embrocha

Binomial name
- Anacampsis embrocha Meyrick, 1914

Species of moth

Anacampsis embrocha is a moth of the family Gelechiidae. It was described by Edward Meyrick in 1914. It is found in South Africa.

The wingspan is about 8 mm. The forewings are dark fuscous with a slender white hardly incurved slightly inwards-oblique fascia at three-fifths. The hindwings are rather dark grey.
