= Anacampsis homoplasta =

Scientific classification
- Kingdom: Animalia
- Phylum: Arthropoda
- Clade: Pancrustacea
- Class: Insecta
- Order: Lepidoptera
- Family: Gelechiidae
- Genus: Anacampsis
- Species: A. homoplasta

Binomial name
- Anacampsis homoplasta (Meyrick, 1932)

Synonyms
- Compsolechia homoplasta Meyrick, 1932

Species of moth

Anacampsis homoplasta is a moth of the family Gelechiidae. It was described by Edward Meyrick in 1932. It is found in Japan and Russia.
