= Anacampsis diplodelta =

Scientific classification
- Kingdom: Animalia
- Phylum: Arthropoda
- Clade: Pancrustacea
- Class: Insecta
- Order: Lepidoptera
- Family: Gelechiidae
- Genus: Anacampsis
- Species: A. diplodelta

Binomial name
- Anacampsis diplodelta Meyrick, 1922

Species of moth

Anacampsis diplodelta is a moth of the family Gelechiidae. It was described by Edward Meyrick in 1922. It is found in Brazil (Amazonas).

The wingspan is about 12 mm (0.47 in). The forewings are violet-grey, more purple-tinged posteriorly and with the costa broadly whitish from the base to the first blotch, and with blackish costal marks at the base and one-fifth, as well as a subcostal dot beyond the second. There are two triangular black costal blotches almost touching and extending on the costa from one-fourth to three-fourths, some white irroration between and beyond these. The stigmata are obscurely darker, with the discal approximated and the plical rather before the first discal and some white irroration around these. A transverse mark of whitish irroration is found beyond the second blotch indicating the subterminal line, the rest hardly traceable. There is also an indistinct dark fuscous marginal streak around the apex and termen. The hindwings are dark fuscous.
