= Anacampsis lapidella =

Scientific classification
- Kingdom: Animalia
- Phylum: Arthropoda
- Clade: Pancrustacea
- Class: Insecta
- Order: Lepidoptera
- Family: Gelechiidae
- Genus: Anacampsis
- Species: A. lapidella

Binomial name
- Anacampsis lapidella Walsingham, 1897

Species of moth

Anacampsis lapidella is a moth of the family Gelechiidae. It was described by Thomas de Grey in 1897. It is found in the West Indies (Grenada).

The wingspan is about 13 mm. The forewings are stone-grey, sprinkled with brownish-fuscous scales, with a series of three brownish-fuscous discal spots, the first diffused downwards across the fold at about one-fifth, the second a little beyond a smaller plical spot beneath it, the third at the end of the cell, of irregular shape and somewhat diffused. Above and a little beyond this is a small costal spot preceding an inverted pale cinereous costal streak, which forms the upper extremity of an ill-defined, narrow, pale cinereous fascia crossing the wing nearly parallel with the termen. The hindwings are brownish cinereous.
