= Anacampsis mongolicae =

Scientific classification
- Kingdom: Animalia
- Phylum: Arthropoda
- Clade: Pancrustacea
- Class: Insecta
- Order: Lepidoptera
- Family: Gelechiidae
- Genus: Anacampsis
- Species: A. mongolicae

Binomial name
- Anacampsis mongolicae Park, 1988

Species of moth

Anacampsis mongolicae is a moth of the family Gelechiidae. It was described by Kyu-Tek Park in 1988. It is found in Japan.
