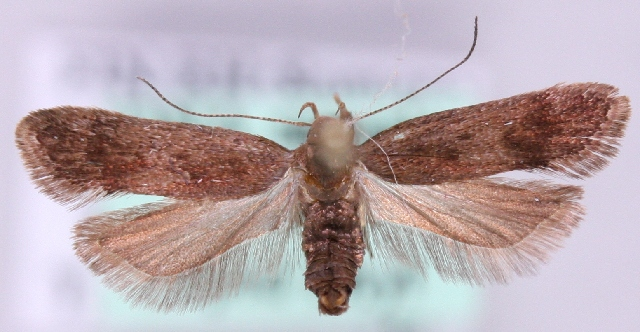

Scientific classification
- Kingdom: Animalia
- Phylum: Arthropoda
- Clade: Pancrustacea
- Class: Insecta
- Order: Lepidoptera
- Family: Gelechiidae
- Genus: Anacampsis
- Species: A. fuscella

Binomial name
- Anacampsis fuscella (Eversmann, 1844)

Synonyms
- Lita fuscella Eversmann, 1844

= Anacampsis fuscella =

Species of moth

Anacampsis fuscella is a moth of the family Gelechiidae. It is found in Sweden, Finland and Russia.

The wingspan is 11–14 mm. Adults are on wing from June to August.

The larvae feed on Trifolium medium.
