= Anacampsis psoraliella =

Scientific classification
- Kingdom: Animalia
- Phylum: Arthropoda
- Clade: Pancrustacea
- Class: Insecta
- Order: Lepidoptera
- Family: Gelechiidae
- Genus: Anacampsis
- Species: A. psoraliella

Binomial name
- Anacampsis psoraliella Barnes & Busck, 1920

Species of moth

Anacampsis psoraliella is a moth of the family Gelechiidae. It was described by William Barnes and August Busck in 1920. It is found in North America, where it has been recorded from Iowa.

The wingspan is 18–21 mm. The forewings are nearly unicolorous blackish brown with the apical fourth a shade lighter. The two shades are faintly but sharply defined by a transverse line, which is slightly but sharply outwardly curved and pointed on the middle. There are four hardly perceptible darker brown spots, one near the base, one on the middle of the cell, one at the end of the cell and one on the middle of the fold. The hindwings are dark olivaceous brown.

The larvae feed on Pediomelum argophyllum (syn. Psoralea argophylla).
