= Anacampsis humilis =

Scientific classification
- Kingdom: Animalia
- Phylum: Arthropoda
- Clade: Pancrustacea
- Class: Insecta
- Order: Lepidoptera
- Family: Gelechiidae
- Genus: Anacampsis
- Species: A. humilis

Binomial name
- Anacampsis humilis Hodges, 1970

Species of moth

Anacampsis humilis is a moth of the family Gelechiidae. It was described by Ronald W. Hodges in 1970. It is found in Brazil.

The larvae feed on the leaves of Trifolium repens.
