= Anacampsis rivalis =

Scientific classification
- Kingdom: Animalia
- Phylum: Arthropoda
- Clade: Pancrustacea
- Class: Insecta
- Order: Lepidoptera
- Family: Gelechiidae
- Genus: Anacampsis
- Species: A. rivalis

Binomial name
- Anacampsis rivalis Meyrick, 1918

Species of moth

Anacampsis rivalis is a moth of the family Gelechiidae. It was described by Edward Meyrick in 1918. It is found in Sri Lanka and southern India.

The wingspan is 13–14 mm. The forewings are grey, the tips of the scales are whitish, sometimes largely tinged light brownish. There are several small obscure spots of blackish irroration along the costa, a stronger spot preceding the subterminal line. The discal stigmata are cloudy, obscure and dark fuscous, with tufts of scales beneath these, and above the dorsum at one-fourth. There is an obscure pale subterminal line from three-fourths of the costa to the tornus, obtusely angulated in the middle and sinuate inwards towards the costa. There is also a cloudy dark terminal line or dots more or less indicated. The hindwings are rather dark grey.
