= Anacampsis anisogramma =

Scientific classification
- Kingdom: Animalia
- Phylum: Arthropoda
- Clade: Pancrustacea
- Class: Insecta
- Order: Lepidoptera
- Family: Gelechiidae
- Genus: Anacampsis
- Species: A. anisogramma

Binomial name
- Anacampsis anisogramma (Meyrick, 1927)

Synonyms
- Compsolechia anisogramma Meyrick, 1927

Species of moth

Anacampsis anisogramma is a moth of the family Gelechiidae. It was described by Edward Meyrick in 1927. It is found in China (Shanghai).

The wingspan is about 17 mm. The forewings are rather dark grey, pale-speckled and with an irregular blotch of blackish-grey suffusion on the base of the dorsum and a small transverse spot of dark grey suffusion in the disc at one-fifth. The stigmata are minute and dark fuscous, the plical slightly before the first discal, the second discal larger but absorbed in the margin of a blackish fascia crossing the wing at two-thirds, the anterior edge suffused, convex, the posterior slightly bisinuate, edged on the costal third by an oblique wedge-shaped whitish-ochreous spot, beneath this by a fine faint whitish tinge. There is also a marginal series of seven small triangular blackish spots around the apical part of the costa and termen. The hindwings are rather dark grey.
