= Anacampsis aedificata =

Scientific classification
- Kingdom: Animalia
- Phylum: Arthropoda
- Clade: Pancrustacea
- Class: Insecta
- Order: Lepidoptera
- Family: Gelechiidae
- Genus: Anacampsis
- Species: A. aedificata

Binomial name
- Anacampsis aedificata Meyrick, 1929

Species of moth

Anacampsis aedificata is a moth of the family Gelechiidae. It was described by Edward Meyrick in 1929. It is found in Brazil (Para).

The wingspan is about 8 mm.
