= Anacampsis capyrodes =

Scientific classification
- Kingdom: Animalia
- Phylum: Arthropoda
- Clade: Pancrustacea
- Class: Insecta
- Order: Lepidoptera
- Family: Gelechiidae
- Genus: Anacampsis
- Species: A. capyrodes

Binomial name
- Anacampsis capyrodes Meyrick, 1922

Species of moth

Anacampsis capyrodes is a moth of the family Gelechiidae. It was described by Edward Meyrick in 1922. It is found in Brazil (Amazonas, Para).

The wingspan is 14–16 mm. The forewings are pale ochreous or brownish-ochreous, variably tinged grey. The stigmata are very small, indistinct and dark fuscous, with the discal approximated and the plical rather obliquely before the first discal. There is an indistinct pale shade from three-fourths of the costa to the dorsum before the tornus, obtusely angulated in the middle, the upper portion slightly sinuate. There are also very small dark fuscous marginal dots around the apex and termen. The hindwings are dark grey or dark fuscous.
