= Anacampsis petrographa =

Scientific classification
- Kingdom: Animalia
- Phylum: Arthropoda
- Clade: Pancrustacea
- Class: Insecta
- Order: Lepidoptera
- Family: Gelechiidae
- Genus: Anacampsis
- Species: A. petrographa

Binomial name
- Anacampsis petrographa Meyrick, 1922

Species of moth

Anacampsis petrographa is a moth of the family Gelechiidae. It was described by Edward Meyrick in 1922. It is found in Brazil (Para).

The wingspan is 15–16 mm. The forewings are light greyish-ochreous or ochreous-grey, sometimes with faint olive-greenish tinge and with some scattered dark fuscous or blackish scales. A black dot is found on the base of the costa and one near the base in the middle and there are small blackish spots on the costa and dorsum at one-fifth, and three cloudy blackish dots in the disc forming with these an excurved series. There is a flattened-triangular blackish blotch on the costa before the middle reaching one-fourth across the wing. The stigmata are blackish, the discal approximated, the plical rather obliquely before the first discal. There is a very indistinct irregular line of whitish irroration from three-fourths of the costa to the dorsum before the tornus, slightly indented beneath the costa, then slightly excurved, preceded on the costa and dorsum by small spots of blackish suffusion. There is also a marginal series of blackish dots around the posterior part of the costa and termen. The hindwings are dark fuscous.
