= Anacampsis prasina =

Scientific classification
- Kingdom: Animalia
- Phylum: Arthropoda
- Clade: Pancrustacea
- Class: Insecta
- Order: Lepidoptera
- Family: Gelechiidae
- Genus: Anacampsis
- Species: A. prasina

Binomial name
- Anacampsis prasina (Meyrick, 1914)

Synonyms
- Agriastis prasina Meyrick, 1914

Species of moth

Anacampsis prasina is a moth of the family Gelechiidae. It was described by Edward Meyrick in 1914. It is found in Guyana.

The wingspan is about 15 mm. The forewings are olive-green, irregularly sprinkled with whitish and with black basal dots on the costa and in the middle. There small black triangular spots on the costa at one-fifth, before the middle, and before the subterminal line. There are some raised scales in the disc about one-fifth, and towards the dorsum before the middle. There is also a small black spot towards the costa before the second costal spot. The stigmata are black, the discal approximated, the second larger, the plical obliquely before the first discal. The subterminal line obscure and whitish-green, from three-fourths of the costa to the tornus, somewhat sinuate inwards on the upper half. Two blackish dots are found on the costa towards the apex and termen beneath the apex. The hindwings are dark fuscous.
