= Anacampsis considerata =

Scientific classification
- Kingdom: Animalia
- Phylum: Arthropoda
- Clade: Pancrustacea
- Class: Insecta
- Order: Lepidoptera
- Family: Gelechiidae
- Genus: Anacampsis
- Species: A. considerata

Binomial name
- Anacampsis considerata Meyrick, 1922

Species of moth

Anacampsis considerata is a moth of the family Gelechiidae. It was described by Edward Meyrick in 1922. It is found in Brazil (Amazonas) and Peru.

The wingspan is 12–15 mm. The forewings are grey or fuscous, irregularly irrorated whitish or ochreous-whitish and with two or three variable small dark fuscous spots at the base and a transverse sometimes interrupted dark fuscous blotch from the costa at one-fifth. There is an indistinct rather oblique dark streak from dorsum at one-fifth more or less developed. A flattened-triangular dark fuscous median blotch is found on the costa, and another before the subterminal line. The stigmata are moderate, raised and dark fuscous, the plical rather before the first discal, an additional dot beneath the second discal, sometimes confluent with it. There is an indistinct pale line from three-fourths of the costa to the dorsum before the tornus, hardly angulated in the middle, sinuate inwards on the upper half. There are two cloudy dark fuscous dots on the costa beyond this, and one or two on the termen beneath the apex. The hindwings are dark fuscous.
