= Anacampsis crypticopa =

Scientific classification
- Kingdom: Animalia
- Phylum: Arthropoda
- Clade: Pancrustacea
- Class: Insecta
- Order: Lepidoptera
- Family: Gelechiidae
- Genus: Anacampsis
- Species: A. crypticopa

Binomial name
- Anacampsis crypticopa (Meyrick, 1931)

Synonyms
- Gelechia crypticopa Meyrick, 1931

Species of moth

Anacampsis crypticopa is a moth of the family Gelechiidae. It was described by Edward Meyrick in 1931. It is found in Argentina.
