= Anacampsis meibomiella =

Scientific classification
- Kingdom: Animalia
- Phylum: Arthropoda
- Clade: Pancrustacea
- Class: Insecta
- Order: Lepidoptera
- Family: Gelechiidae
- Genus: Anacampsis
- Species: A. meibomiella

Binomial name
- Anacampsis meibomiella Forbes, 1931

Species of moth

Anacampsis meibomiella is a moth of the family Gelechiidae. It was described by William Trowbridge Merrifield Forbes in 1931. It is found in Puerto Rico and Cuba.
