= Anacampsis chlorodecta =

Scientific classification
- Kingdom: Animalia
- Phylum: Arthropoda
- Clade: Pancrustacea
- Class: Insecta
- Order: Lepidoptera
- Family: Gelechiidae
- Genus: Anacampsis
- Species: A. chlorodecta

Binomial name
- Anacampsis chlorodecta (Meyrick, 1932)

Synonyms
- Compsolechia chlorodecta Meyrick, 1932

Species of moth

Anacampsis chlorodecta is a moth of the family Gelechiidae. It was described by Edward Meyrick in 1932. It is found in Manchuria.
