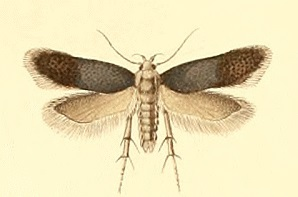

Scientific classification
- Kingdom: Animalia
- Phylum: Arthropoda
- Clade: Pancrustacea
- Class: Insecta
- Order: Lepidoptera
- Family: Gelechiidae
- Genus: Anacampsis
- Species: A. trifoliella

Binomial name
- Anacampsis trifoliella (Constant, 1890)

Synonyms
- Tachyptilia trifoliella Constant, 1890

= Anacampsis trifoliella =

Species of moth

Anacampsis trifoliella is a moth of the family Gelechiidae. It is found in France, Italy and Switzerland.

The wingspan is about 12 mm.
