= Anacampsis panormitella =

Scientific classification
- Kingdom: Animalia
- Phylum: Arthropoda
- Clade: Pancrustacea
- Class: Insecta
- Order: Lepidoptera
- Family: Gelechiidae
- Genus: Anacampsis
- Species: A. panormitella

Binomial name
- Anacampsis panormitella (Caradja, 1920)

Synonyms
- Tachyptilia panormitella Caradja, 1920

Species of moth

Anacampsis panormitella is a moth of the family Gelechiidae. It was described by Aristide Caradja in 1920. It is found in Turkey.
