= Anacampsis lupinella =

Scientific classification
- Kingdom: Animalia
- Phylum: Arthropoda
- Clade: Pancrustacea
- Class: Insecta
- Order: Lepidoptera
- Family: Gelechiidae
- Genus: Anacampsis
- Species: A. lupinella

Binomial name
- Anacampsis lupinella Busck, 1901

Species of moth

Anacampsis lupinella is a moth of the family Gelechiidae. It was described by August Busck in 1901. It is found in North America, where it has been recorded from Ontario, Florida, Illinois, Louisiana and Texas.

The wingspan is about 14 millimetres (0.55 in). The forewings are purplish black, with a satin lustre and with numerous evenly distributed bluish white scales, only visible under a lens. There are several varieties. The forewings in some specimens are without any markings, while in others they have a distinct whitish-yellow spot at the beginning of the costal cilia and another similar dorsal spot opposite. In yet other specimens these spots are extended downwards and upwards relatively and meet each other, forming a narrow transverse fascia. The hindwings are black, with strong purple reflections.

The larvae feed on Lupinus perennis.
