= Anacampsis kearfottella =

Scientific classification
- Kingdom: Animalia
- Phylum: Arthropoda
- Clade: Pancrustacea
- Class: Insecta
- Order: Lepidoptera
- Family: Gelechiidae
- Genus: Anacampsis
- Species: A. kearfottella

Binomial name
- Anacampsis kearfottella (Busck, 1903)

Synonyms
- Aproaerema kearfottella Busck, 1903

Species of moth

Anacampsis kearfottella is a moth of the family Gelechiidae. It was described by August Busck in 1903. It is found in North America, where it has been recorded in Kentucky, Pennsylvania and New Jersey.

The wingspan is about 12 mm. The forewings are silvery white at the base, gradually becoming overlaid with fuscous outward. The outer half of the wing is dark fuscous with a silver-yellowish lustre. At the end of the cell is a small round black dot. At the beginning of the costal cilia is a short oblique triangular light yellow spot and there is a heavy deep black line at the base of the cilia, around the entire apical edge, interrupted by four costal and three dorsal short indistinct yellowish-white dashes, which are faintly continued out in the dark fuscous cilia. The dorsal edge opposite the costal triangular spot is yellowish. The hindwings are dark fuscous, nearly black, with silvery reflections.
