= Anacampsis flexiloqua =

Scientific classification
- Kingdom: Animalia
- Phylum: Arthropoda
- Clade: Pancrustacea
- Class: Insecta
- Order: Lepidoptera
- Family: Gelechiidae
- Genus: Anacampsis
- Species: A. flexiloqua

Binomial name
- Anacampsis flexiloqua Meyrick, 1922

Species of moth

Anacampsis flexiloqua is a moth of the family Gelechiidae. It was described by Edward Meyrick in 1922. It is found in Peru.

The wingspan is about 11 mm. The forewings are fuscous sprinkled brownish with the plical and second discal stigmata obscurely darker. There is a faint paler shade from three-fourths of the costa to the tornus, obtusely angulated in the middle, with the halves straight. Two or three indistinct dark dots are found on the upper part of termen. The hindwings are dark fuscous.
