= Anacampsis viretella =

Scientific classification
- Kingdom: Animalia
- Phylum: Arthropoda
- Clade: Pancrustacea
- Class: Insecta
- Order: Lepidoptera
- Family: Gelechiidae
- Genus: Anacampsis
- Species: A. viretella

Binomial name
- Anacampsis viretella (Zeller, 1877)

Synonyms
- Gelechia (Teleia) viretella Zeller, 1877; Dichomeris viretella

Species of moth

Anacampsis viretella is a moth of the family Gelechiidae. It was described by Philipp Christoph Zeller in 1877. It is found in Central America.
