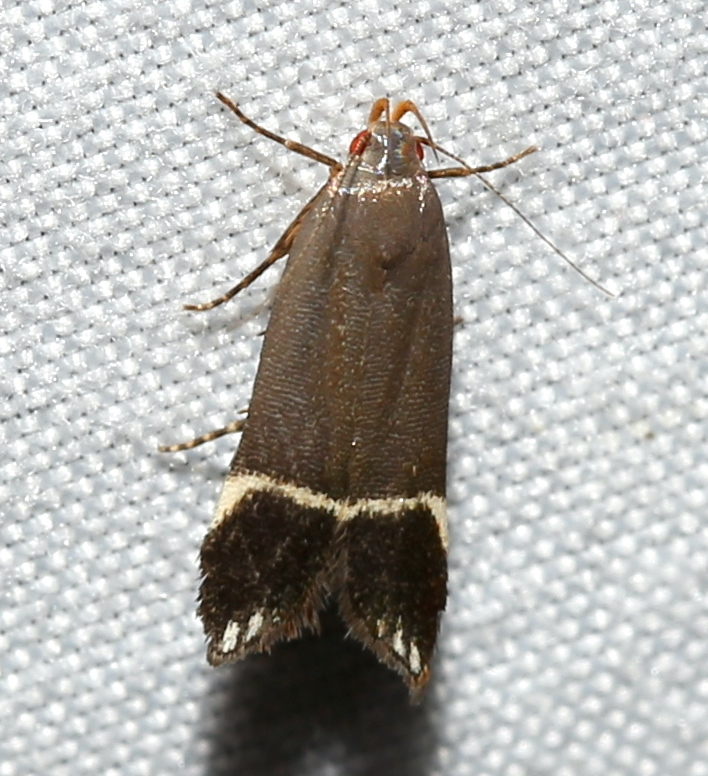

Scientific classification
- Kingdom: Animalia
- Phylum: Arthropoda
- Clade: Pancrustacea
- Class: Insecta
- Order: Lepidoptera
- Family: Gelechiidae
- Genus: Anacampsis
- Species: A. tristrigella

Binomial name
- Anacampsis tristrigella (Walsingham, 1882)

Synonyms
- Gelechia (Anacampsis) tristrigella Walsingham, 1882

= Anacampsis tristrigella =

Species of moth

Anacampsis tristrigella is a moth of the family Gelechiidae. It was described by Thomas de Grey in 1882. It is found in North America, where it has been recorded Alabama, Arkansas, Manitoba, Massachusetts, Mississippi, Ontario, Quebec, Tennessee and Texas.

The wingspan is about 12 mm. The forewings are greyish fuscous from the base to beyond the middle, with a greenish hue in some lights and a steel-grey streak along the costal margin, passing over the front of the thorax, beyond the middle very dark brown, with a transverse white fascia extended outwards at the commencement of the costal cilia, narrowed in the middle of the wing, and somewhat dilated about the dorsal margin. Beyond it are three, sometimes four, white tooth-like streaks, with their bases joined towards the apical margin and separated from the steel-grey fringes by a reduplicated line of dark brown, which passes around the apex. The hindwings are brown, with grey fringes, oblique, but scarcely emarginate below the apex. The base of the costal margin is steel-grey.

The larvae feed on Corylus americana.
