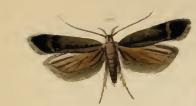

Scientific classification
- Kingdom: Animalia
- Phylum: Arthropoda
- Clade: Pancrustacea
- Class: Insecta
- Order: Lepidoptera
- Family: Gelechiidae
- Genus: Anacampsis
- Species: A. scintillella

Binomial name
- Anacampsis scintillella (Fischer von Röslerstamm, 1841)

Synonyms
- Lita scintillella Fischer von Röslerstamm, 1841; Anacampsis brunneella Herrich-Schäffer, 1854; Gelechia contuberniella Staudinger, 1859

= Anacampsis scintillella =

Species of moth

Anacampsis scintillella is a moth of the family Gelechiidae. It is found in most of Europe, except Ireland, Great Britain, the Netherlands, Norway, Finland, most of the Baltic region and Poland.

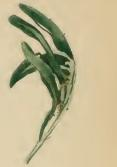
A sprig of Helianthemum vulgare eaten by larva

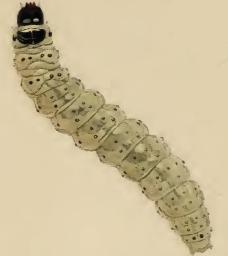
Larva

The wingspan is 12–13 mm. Adults are on wing from June to August.

The larvae feed on Helianthemum species.
