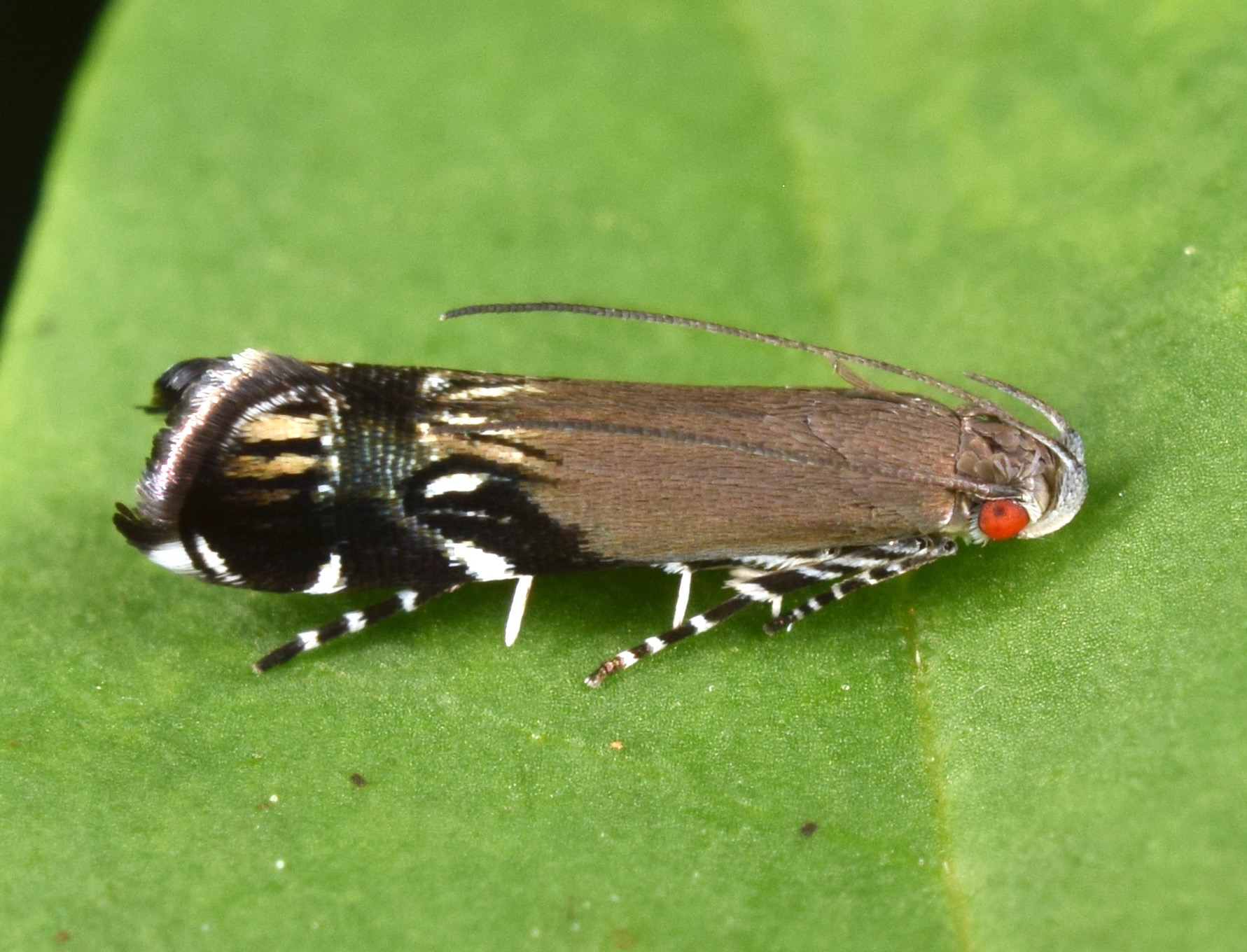

Scientific classification
- Kingdom: Animalia
- Phylum: Arthropoda
- Clade: Pancrustacea
- Class: Insecta
- Order: Lepidoptera
- Family: Gelechiidae
- Genus: Anacampsis
- Species: A. levipedella

Binomial name
- Anacampsis levipedella (Clemens, 1863)

Synonyms
- Strobisia levipedella Clemens, 1863

= Anacampsis levipedella =

Species of moth

Anacampsis levipedella is a moth of the family Gelechiidae. It was described by James Brackenridge Clemens in 1863. It is found in North America, where it has been recorded from Alabama, Florida, Georgia, Illinois, Indiana, Iowa, Kentucky, Maryland, Massachusetts, Mississippi, New Jersey, New York, North Carolina, Ohio, Oklahoma, Tennessee, Texas, Virginia, West Virginia and Wisconsin.

The forewings are dark brownish, with a cupreous line. The apical half of the wing is darker than the basal half. About the middle of the costa is a short, oblique white streak and another of the same hue midway between it and the tip of the wing, perpendicular to the costa and of nearly triangular form. Beneath the first costal streak are two short, longitudinal dashes, one on each side of the fold of the wing, and two others of the same hue, parallel, and beneath the second costal streak. The hindwings are dark brownish.
