= Anacampsis idiocentra =

Scientific classification
- Kingdom: Animalia
- Phylum: Arthropoda
- Clade: Pancrustacea
- Class: Insecta
- Order: Lepidoptera
- Family: Gelechiidae
- Genus: Anacampsis
- Species: A. idiocentra

Binomial name
- Anacampsis idiocentra Meyrick, 1922

Species of moth

Anacampsis idiocentra is a moth of the family Gelechiidae. It was described by Edward Meyrick in 1922. It is found in Brazil (Para).

The wingspan is 10–12 mm. The forewings are greyish-ochreous with the plical and second discal stigmata small, indistinct and fuscous. There is a faint pale shade from four-fifths of the costa to the tornus, nearly straight, slightly indented above the middle and sometimes hardly perceptible. Two cloudy blackish dots are found on the termen beneath the apex, sometimes a third smaller beneath these. The hindwings are dark fuscous.
