= Anacampsis malella =

Scientific classification
- Kingdom: Animalia
- Phylum: Arthropoda
- Clade: Pancrustacea
- Class: Insecta
- Order: Lepidoptera
- Family: Gelechiidae
- Genus: Anacampsis
- Species: A. malella

Binomial name
- Anacampsis malella Amsel, 1959

Species of moth

Anacampsis malella is a moth of the family Gelechiidae. It is found in Greece and Iraq.
