= Anacampsis maculatella =

Scientific classification
- Kingdom: Animalia
- Phylum: Arthropoda
- Clade: Pancrustacea
- Class: Insecta
- Order: Lepidoptera
- Family: Gelechiidae
- Genus: Anacampsis
- Species: A. maculatella

Binomial name
- Anacampsis maculatella (D. Lucas, 1956)

Synonyms
- Tachyptilia maculatella D. Lucas, 1956

Species of moth

Anacampsis maculatella is a moth of the family Gelechiidae. It was described by Daniel Lucas in 1956. It is found in Morocco.
