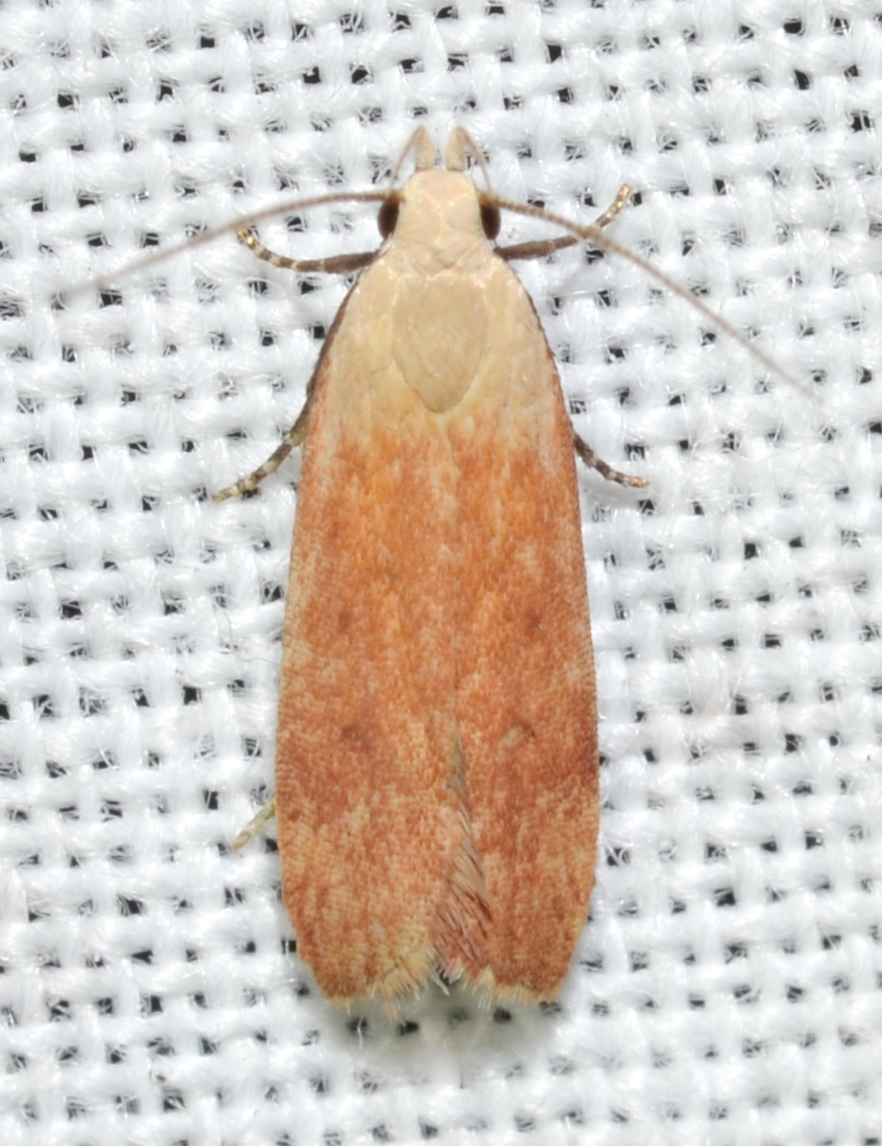

Scientific classification
- Kingdom: Animalia
- Phylum: Arthropoda
- Clade: Pancrustacea
- Class: Insecta
- Order: Lepidoptera
- Family: Gelechiidae
- Genus: Anacampsis
- Species: A. fullonella

Binomial name
- Anacampsis fullonella (Zeller, 1873)

Synonyms
- Gelechia (Ceratophora) fullonella Zeller, 1873; Gelechia rufusella Chambers, 1874; Gelechia subruberella Chambers, 1874; Gelechia bidiscomaculella Chambers, 1874; Menesta rubescens Walsingham, 1881

= Anacampsis fullonella =

Species of moth

Anacampsis fullonella is a moth of the family Gelechiidae. It was described by Philipp Christoph Zeller in 1873. It is found in North America, where it has been recorded from Arkansas, Florida, Illinois, Kentucky, Louisiana, Mississippi, New Mexico, Oklahoma and Texas.
