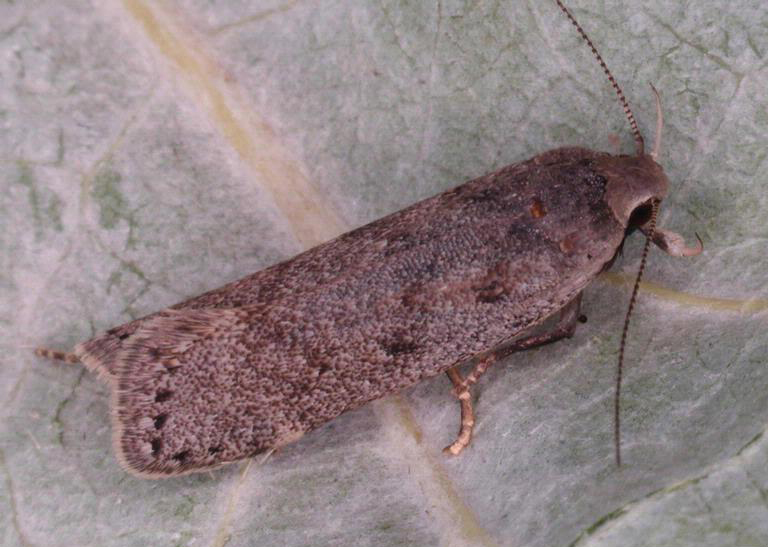
- Anacampsis populella

Scientific classification
- Domain: Eukaryota
- Kingdom: Animalia
- Phylum: Arthropoda
- Class: Insecta
- Order: Lepidoptera
- Family: Gelechiidae
- Tribe: Anacampsini
- Genus: Anacampsis; Curtis, 1827

Synonyms
- Agriastis Meyrick, 1914; Tachyptilia Heinemann, 1870

= Anacampsis =

Genus of moths

Anacampsis is a worldwide genus of moth with most found in the nearctic and neotropical regions. It is in the family Gelechiidae. The larvae feed on a range of deciduous trees and shrubs in a rolled or folded leaf, or spun shoot.

== Species ==
- Anacampsis aedificata Meyrick, 1929
- Anacampsis agrimoniella (Clemens, 1860)
- Anacampsis anisogramma (Meyrick, 1927)
- Anacampsis argyrothamniella Busck, 1900
- Anacampsis blattariella (Hubner, 1796)
- Anacampsis capyrodes Meyrick, 1922
- Anacampsis cenelpis (Walsingham, 1911)
- Anacampsis chlorodecta (Meyrick, 1932)
- Anacampsis comparanda (Meyrick, 1929)
- Anacampsis conclusella (Walker, 1864)
- Anacampsis conistica Walsingham, 1910
- Anacampsis considerata Meyrick, 1922
- Anacampsis consonella (Zeller, 1873)
- Anacampsis cornifer Walsingham, 1897
- Anacampsis cosmia Meyrick, 1921
- Anacampsis coverdalella Kearfott, 1903
- Anacampsis crypticopa (Meyrick, 1931)
- Anacampsis diplodelta Meyrick, 1922
- Anacampsis embrocha Meyrick, 1914
- Anacampsis flexiloqua Meyrick, 1922
- Anacampsis fragariella Busck, 1904
- Anacampsis fullonella (Zeller, 1873)
- Anacampsis fuscella (Eversmann, 1844)
- Anacampsis hirsutella (Constant, 1885)
- Anacampsis homoplasta (Meyrick, 1932)
- Anacampsis humilis Hodges, 1970
- Anacampsis idiocentra Meyrick, 1922
- Anacampsis innocuella (Zeller, 1873)
- Anacampsis inquieta (Meyrick, 1914)
- Anacampsis insularis Walsingham, 1897
- Anacampsis kearfottella (Busck, 1903)
- Anacampsis lacteusochrella (Chambers, 1875)
- Anacampsis lagunculariella Busck, 1900
- Anacampsis languens Meyrick, 1918
- Anacampsis lapidella Walsingham, 1897
- Anacampsis levipedella (Clemens, 1863)
- Anacampsis lignaria (Meyrick, 1926)
- Anacampsis lithodelta Meyrick, 1922
- Anacampsis lupinella Busck, 1901
- Anacampsis maculatella (Lucas, 1956)
- Anacampsis malella Amsel, 1959
- Anacampsis meibomiella Forbes, 1931
- Anacampsis mongolicae Park, 1988
- Anacampsis multinotata (Meyrick, 1918)
- Anacampsis niveopulvella (Chambers, 1875)
- Anacampsis nocturna (Meyrick, 1914)
- Anacampsis nonstrigella Busck, 1906
- Anacampsis obscurella (Denis & Schiffermuller, 1775)
- Anacampsis okui Park, 1988
- Anacampsis paltodoriella Busck, 1903
- Anacampsis panormitella (Caradja, 1920)
- Anacampsis peloptila (Meyrick, 1914)
- Anacampsis perquisita Meyrick, 1922
- Anacampsis petrographa Meyrick, 1922
- Anacampsis phytomiella Busck, 1914
- Anacampsis poliombra Meyrick, 1922
- Anacampsis pomaceella (Walker, 1864)
- Anacampsis populella (Clerck, 1759)
- Anacampsis prasina (Meyrick, 1914)
- Anacampsis primigenia Meyrick, 1918
- Anacampsis psoraliella Barnes & Busck, 1920
- Anacampsis quinquepunctella Walsingham, 1897
- Anacampsis rhabdodes Walsingham, 1910
- Anacampsis rhoifructella (Clemens, 1861)
- Anacampsis rivalis Meyrick, 1918
- Anacampsis sacramenta Keifer, 1933
- Anacampsis scalata (Meyrick, 1914)
- Anacampsis scintillella (Fischer von Röslerstamm, 1841)
- Anacampsis solemnella (Christoph, 1882)
- Anacampsis subactella (Walker, 1864)
- Anacampsis temerella (Lienig & Zeller, 1846)
- Anacampsis tephriasella (Chambers, 1872)
- Anacampsis timidella (Wocke, 1887)
- Anacampsis triangularis Braun, 1923
- Anacampsis triangulella Park, 1988
- Anacampsis tridentella (Walsingham, 1910)
- Anacampsis trifoliella (Constant, 1890)
- Anacampsis tristrigella (Walsingham, 1882)
- Anacampsis ursula Walsingham, 1910
- Anacampsis viretella (Zeller, 1877)
- Anacampsis wikeri Harrison, 2013

== Status unclear ==
- Anacampsis hamartola Walsingham
- Anacampsis karmeliella Amsel, 1935

== Former species ==
- Anacampsis parviocellatella Bruand, 1850
