= Anacampsis tridentella =

Scientific classification
- Kingdom: Animalia
- Phylum: Arthropoda
- Clade: Pancrustacea
- Class: Insecta
- Order: Lepidoptera
- Family: Gelechiidae
- Genus: Anacampsis
- Species: A. tridentella

Binomial name
- Anacampsis tridentella (Walsingham, 1910)

Synonyms
- Cathegesis tridentella Walsingham, 1910

Species of moth

Anacampsis tridentella is a moth of the family Gelechiidae. It was described by Thomas de Grey in 1910. It is found in Mexico (state of Guerrero).

The wingspan is about 13 mm. The forewings are brownish cinereous, shaded with greyish brown along the costa, except at the base and on the apical fifth. This darker shading is diffused downward as far as the middle of the fold, and in a broken and diluted form reaches the dorsum and extends outward to above the tornus, where it is terminated by a pale ante-apical band sinuate inward below the costa and outward above the tornus, the somewhat pale apical space containing three dark fuscous tooth-like streaks. The hindwings are brownish grey.
