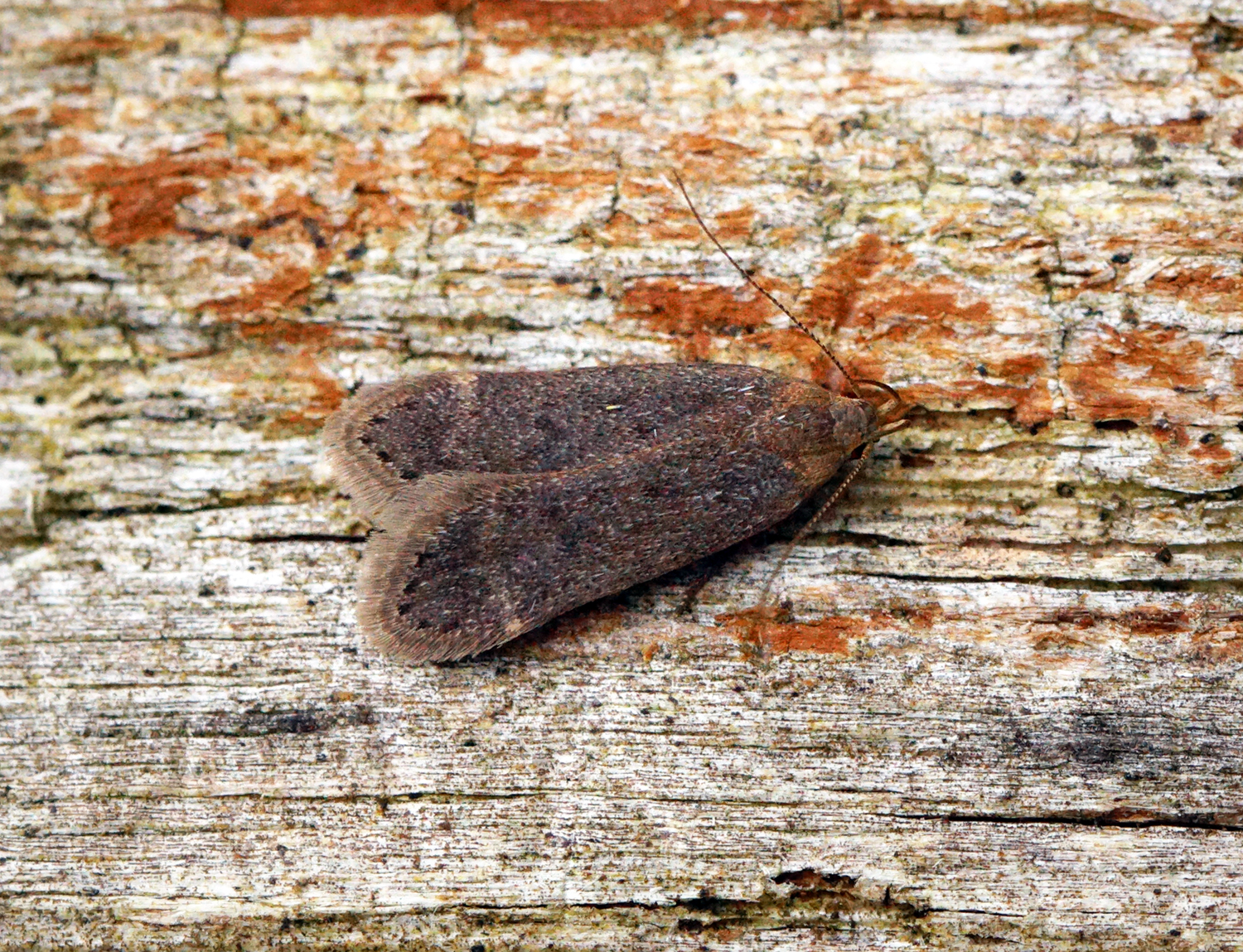

Scientific classification
- Kingdom: Animalia
- Phylum: Arthropoda
- Clade: Pancrustacea
- Class: Insecta
- Order: Lepidoptera
- Family: Gelechiidae
- Genus: Anacampsis
- Species: A. timidella

Binomial name
- Anacampsis timidella (Wocke, 1887)

Synonyms
- Tachyptilia timidella Wocke, 1887; Tachyptilia disquei Mess, 1907; Anacampsis quercella Chretien, 1907; Anacampsis suberiella Caradja, 1920

= Anacampsis timidella =

Species of moth

Anacampsis timidella is a moth of the family Gelechiidae. It is found in most of Europe, except Ireland, Great Britain, the Benelux, Denmark, Fennoscandia, the Baltic region, Slovenia and Bulgaria.

The wingspan is 15–17 mm.

The larvae feed on Quercus species, mainly Quercus pubescens from within a rolled leaf. The larvae are about 12 mm in length. They have a red-violet body and black-brown head.
