= Anacampsis subactella =

Scientific classification
- Kingdom: Animalia
- Phylum: Arthropoda
- Clade: Pancrustacea
- Class: Insecta
- Order: Lepidoptera
- Family: Gelechiidae
- Genus: Anacampsis
- Species: A. subactella

Binomial name
- Anacampsis subactella (Walker, 1864)

Synonyms
- Gelechia subactella Walker, 1864

Species of moth

Anacampsis subactella is a moth of the family Gelechiidae. It was described by Francis Walker in 1864. It is found in Australia.

Adults are dark cinereous (ash grey), the forewings thickly blackish speckled, with some longitudinal black streaks, and with a blackish stripe, which is dilated and abbreviated exteriorly, and contains a short slender whitish streak. The exterior border is slightly convex and very oblique.
