= Anacampsis wikeri =

Scientific classification
- Kingdom: Animalia
- Phylum: Arthropoda
- Clade: Pancrustacea
- Class: Insecta
- Order: Lepidoptera
- Family: Gelechiidae
- Genus: Anacampsis
- Species: A. wikeri

Binomial name
- Anacampsis wikeri Harrison, 2013

Species of moth

Anacampsis wikeri is a moth of the family Gelechiidae. It was described by Harrison in 2013. It is found in North America, where it has been recorded from Illinois and Iowa. The habitat consists of prairies.

Adults are on wing from mid-June onwards, overwintering as an adult. There is one generation per year.

The larvae feed on Amorpha canescens. They feed on the terminal leaflets of the host plant.
