= Anacampsis conclusella =

Scientific classification
- Kingdom: Animalia
- Phylum: Arthropoda
- Clade: Pancrustacea
- Class: Insecta
- Order: Lepidoptera
- Family: Gelechiidae
- Genus: Anacampsis
- Species: A. conclusella

Binomial name
- Anacampsis conclusella (Walker, 1864)

Synonyms
- Gelechia conclusella Walker, 1864; Gelechia grissefasciella Chambers, 1875

Species of moth

Anacampsis conclusella is a moth of the family Gelechiidae. It was described by Francis Walker in 1864. It is found in North America, where it has been recorded from Alabama, Alberta, Florida, Illinois, Indiana, Kentucky, Louisiana, Maine, Maryland, Mississippi, New York, North Carolina, Ohio, Oklahoma, Pennsylvania, South Carolina, Tennessee, Texas and West Virginia.

The wingspan is 9 mm. Adults are dark cinereous (ash gray), the forewings very minutely speckled with black and with a pale cinereous transverse line at two-thirds of the length, forming two angles. There are three black costal marks, the first and second small and elongate and the third much larger, extending to the disc. A submarginal line of elongated black points, and a few small elongated black points is found in the disc and the exterior border is slightly convex, moderately oblique.
