= Anacampsis lagunculariella =

Scientific classification
- Kingdom: Animalia
- Phylum: Arthropoda
- Clade: Pancrustacea
- Class: Insecta
- Order: Lepidoptera
- Family: Gelechiidae
- Genus: Anacampsis
- Species: A. lagunculariella

Binomial name
- Anacampsis lagunculariella Busck, 1900

Species of moth

Anacampsis lagunculariella is a moth of the family Gelechiidae. It was described by August Busck in 1900. It is found in Panama, Cuba and the southern United States, where it has been recorded from Florida.

The wingspan is 15–16 mm. The forewings are yellowish brown with sparse, scattered, black scales. The extreme base of the costa is black and at the middle of the wing is a triangular black costal spot, sometimes followed by a smaller indistinct collection of black scales at the costa at the apical third. Sometimes this latter is wanting. The intervals between the veins are depressed, and in these depressions, one in each, is a row of four to six small black dots around the apex. The hindwings are dark purplish grey. The larvae feed on Laguncularia racemosa, tying the leaves of their host plant.
