= Anacampsis agrimoniella =

Scientific classification
- Kingdom: Animalia
- Phylum: Arthropoda
- Clade: Pancrustacea
- Class: Insecta
- Order: Lepidoptera
- Family: Gelechiidae
- Genus: Anacampsis
- Species: A. agrimoniella

Binomial name
- Anacampsis agrimoniella (Clemens, 1860)

Synonyms
- Gelechia agrimoniella Clemens, 1860; Gelechia aduncella Zeller, 1868

Species of moth

Anacampsis agrimoniella is a moth of the family Gelechiidae. It was described by James Brackenridge Clemens in 1860. It is found in North America, where it has been recorded from Ontario and New York south to Florida, west to Illinois. The habitat consists of woodlands and wood edges.

The larvae feed on Agrimonia species.
