= Anacampsis obscurella =

Scientific classification
- Kingdom: Animalia
- Phylum: Arthropoda
- Clade: Pancrustacea
- Class: Insecta
- Order: Lepidoptera
- Family: Gelechiidae
- Genus: Anacampsis
- Species: A. obscurella

Binomial name
- Anacampsis obscurella (Denis & Schiffermüller, 1775)

Synonyms
- Tinea obscurella Denis & Schiffermüller, 1775; Tinea subsequella Hübner, 1796

Species of moth

Anacampsis obscurella is a moth of the family Gelechiidae. It is found in most of Europe, except Ireland, Great Britain, the Netherlands, Portugal, Denmark, Fennoscandia, the Baltic region, Poland, Switzerland, Slovenia and Croatia.

The wingspan is 12–13 mm. Adults are on wing from June to September.

The larvae feed on Salix, Cerasus, Cotoneaster, Crataegus, Prunus domestica, Prunus spinosa and Sorbus from within a rolled leaf.
