= Anacampsis cenelpis =

Scientific classification
- Kingdom: Animalia
- Phylum: Arthropoda
- Clade: Pancrustacea
- Class: Insecta
- Order: Lepidoptera
- Family: Gelechiidae
- Genus: Anacampsis
- Species: A. cenelpis

Binomial name
- Anacampsis cenelpis (Walsingham, 1911)

Synonyms
- Untomia cenelpis Walsingham, 1911

Species of moth

Anacampsis cenelpis is a moth of the family Gelechiidae. It was described by Thomas de Grey, 6th Baron Walsingham, in 1911. It is found in Mexico (Tabasco).

The wingspan is about 10 mm. The forewings are dark greenish olivaceous, with minute paler speckling and some blackish patches and suffusion. A small black spot at the extreme base of the costa is followed by a second costal spot before one-third. An elongate costal spot precedes the middle, and there is a larger one beyond the middle, pointing downward to an obscure spot at the end of the cell, and forming, at its outer edge, the margin of a slender pale olivaceous line crossing the wing from the costal to the dorsal cilia. This line is angulated inward on its upper half and outward at its middle, then descending straight to the dorsum. Beyond it are two or three blackish spots before the evenly rounded apex, and there is some indication of a similar spot on the fold before its middle. None of the markings are clearly defined. The hindwings are brownish fuscous.
