= Anacampsis inquieta =

Scientific classification
- Kingdom: Animalia
- Phylum: Arthropoda
- Clade: Pancrustacea
- Class: Insecta
- Order: Lepidoptera
- Family: Gelechiidae
- Genus: Anacampsis
- Species: A. inquieta

Binomial name
- Anacampsis inquieta (Meyrick, 1914)

Synonyms
- Agriastis inquieta Meyrick, 1914

Species of moth

Anacampsis inquieta is a moth of the family Gelechiidae. It was described by Edward Meyrick in 1914. It is found in Guyana.

The wingspan is 15–16 mm. The forewings are pale greyish-ochreous, more or less tinged or suffused with brown, and sprinkled with fuscous and dark fuscous scales and with a dark fuscous elongate dot towards the costa near the base and elongate dark fuscous marks on the costa about the middle and two-thirds. The stigmata are represented by small tufts of dark fuscous or blackish scales suffused with reddish-brown, an additional tuft adjoining the first discal obliquely above and before it, the plical beneath the first discal, an additional tuft beneath the second discal. There is a spot of dark reddish-fuscous suffusion on the dorsum before the tornus and a row of blackish dots around the posterior part of the costa and termen. The hindwings are dark fuscous.
