= Anacampsis temerella =

Scientific classification
- Kingdom: Animalia
- Phylum: Arthropoda
- Clade: Pancrustacea
- Class: Insecta
- Order: Lepidoptera
- Family: Gelechiidae
- Genus: Anacampsis
- Species: A. temerella

Binomial name
- Anacampsis temerella (Lienig & Zeller, 1846)

Synonyms
- Gelechia temerella Lienig & Zeller, 1846; Gelechia pernigrella Douglas, 1850

Species of moth

Anacampsis temerella is a moth of the family Gelechiidae, found in most of Europe, except Belgium, Switzerland, the Iberian Peninsula and the Balkan Peninsula.

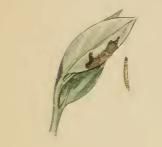
A sprig of Salix eaten by larva

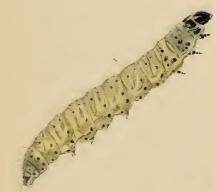
Larva

The wingspan is 11–14 mm. The forewings are blackish, slightly violet-tinged; stigmata deep black, very indistinct, first discal beyond plical; a broad suffused black fascia at 2/3. Hindwings 1 rather dark grey. The larva is whitish; dots black; head and plate of 2 black. Adults are on wing in July and August.

The larvae feed on Salix species, including tea-leaved willow (Salix phylicifolia), great sallow (Salix caprea), downy willow (Salix lapponum) and creeping willow (Salix repens). They feed in a spinning in the terminal shoots of their host plant.
