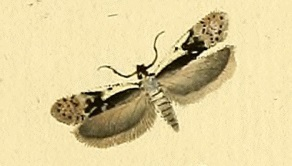

Scientific classification
- Kingdom: Animalia
- Phylum: Arthropoda
- Clade: Pancrustacea
- Class: Insecta
- Order: Lepidoptera
- Family: Gelechiidae
- Genus: Anacampsis
- Species: A. blattariella

Binomial name
- Anacampsis blattariella (Hübner, 1796)

Synonyms
- Tinea blattariella Hübner, 1796; Tinea thapsiella Hübner, 1796; Recurvaria blattariae Haworth, 1828; Anacampsis populella var. atragriseella Bruand, 1850; Anacampsis betulinella Vári, 1941

= Anacampsis blattariella =

Birch sober

Species of moth

Anacampsis blattariella, the birch sober, is a moth of the family Gelechiidae. It is found in most of Europe, except Ireland, the Iberian Peninsula and most of the Balkan Peninsula.

The wingspan is 16–19 mm. Adults are on wing from July to September.
