= Anacampsis consonella =

Scientific classification
- Kingdom: Animalia
- Phylum: Arthropoda
- Clade: Pancrustacea
- Class: Insecta
- Order: Lepidoptera
- Family: Gelechiidae
- Genus: Anacampsis
- Species: A. consonella

Binomial name
- Anacampsis consonella (Zeller, 1873)

Synonyms
- Gelechia (Tachyptilia) consonella Zeller, 1873; Gelechia quadrimaculella Chambers, 1874; Gelechia ochreocostella Chambers, 1878

Species of moth

Anacampsis consonella is a moth of the family Gelechiidae. It was described by Philipp Christoph Zeller in 1873. It is found in North America, where it has been recorded from the eastern United States and south-eastern Canada.
