= Filatima biminimaculella =

Scientific classification
- Domain: Eukaryota
- Kingdom: Animalia
- Phylum: Arthropoda
- Class: Insecta
- Order: Lepidoptera
- Family: Gelechiidae
- Genus: Filatima
- Species: F. biminimaculella

Binomial name
- Filatima biminimaculella (Chambers, 1880)

Synonyms
- Gelechia biminimaculella Chambers, 1880; Fascista biminimaculella

Species of moth

Filatima biminimaculella is a moth of the family Gelechiidae. It is found in North America, where it has been recorded from Alabama, Arkansas, Georgia, Louisiana, Maryland, Mississippi, Missouri, Oklahoma, South Carolina, Tennessee and Texas.

Adults are similar to Filatima pseudacaciella, but are a little darker and lack the white dusting in the apical part of the wing. There is also a small ochreous spot on each side of the apex of the thorax. Otherwise, the species resemble closely being brown with a faint purplish hue, more or less distinctly streaked longitudinally, with ochreous within the costal margin.
