= Filatima saliciphaga =

Scientific classification
- Domain: Eukaryota
- Kingdom: Animalia
- Phylum: Arthropoda
- Class: Insecta
- Order: Lepidoptera
- Family: Gelechiidae
- Genus: Filatima
- Species: F. saliciphaga

Binomial name
- Filatima saliciphaga (Keifer, 1937)

Synonyms
- Gelechia saliciphaga Keifer, 1937

Species of moth

Filatima saliciphaga is a moth of the family Gelechiidae. It is found in North America, where it has been recorded from California.

The wingspan is 18–21 mm. The forewings are tan to whitish tan, with scales tipped ochreous brown to fuscous, producing a light irroration. The wing features ill-defined markings and usually has a black mark along the dorsal base. There are remnants of a dark streak through the center of the wing. The plical stigma is not distinguishable, and the first discal stigma appears as a black dot at just beyond one-third, while the second discal at nearly two-thirds. There is sometimes an oblique dark area toward the tornus. The hindwings are white, lightly infuscated.

The larvae feed on Salix sessilifolia.
