= Filatima persicaeella =

Scientific classification
- Domain: Eukaryota
- Kingdom: Animalia
- Phylum: Arthropoda
- Class: Insecta
- Order: Lepidoptera
- Family: Gelechiidae
- Genus: Filatima
- Species: F. persicaeella

Binomial name
- Filatima persicaeella (Murtfeldt, 1899)

Synonyms
- Depressaria persicaeella Murtfeldt, 1899; Gelechia confusella Chambers, 1875 (preocc. Heinemann, 1870)

Species of moth

Filatima persicaeella is a moth of the family Gelechiidae. It is found in North America, where it has been recorded from Michigan and Maine.

There is a small white spot on the fold of the forewing about the middle, another opposite to it on the disc. Behind the space between these two is another minute yellowish-white spot. There are also small opposite costal and dorsal spots at the beginning of the cilia.

The larvae feed on Prunus persica.
