= Filatima zagulajevi =

Scientific classification
- Kingdom: Animalia
- Phylum: Arthropoda
- Clade: Pancrustacea
- Class: Insecta
- Order: Lepidoptera
- Family: Gelechiidae
- Genus: Filatima
- Species: F. zagulajevi

Binomial name
- Filatima zagulajevi Anikin & Piskunov, 1996

Species of moth

Filatima zagulajevi is a moth of the family Gelechiidae. It is found in the European part of southern Russia (the Volga-Don region, the Lower Volga and southern Ural).
