= Filatima nigripectus =

Scientific classification
- Domain: Eukaryota
- Kingdom: Animalia
- Phylum: Arthropoda
- Class: Insecta
- Order: Lepidoptera
- Family: Gelechiidae
- Genus: Filatima
- Species: F. nigripectus

Binomial name
- Filatima nigripectus (Walsingham, 1911)

Synonyms
- Gelechia nigripectus Walsingham, 1911

Species of moth

Filatima nigripectus is a moth of the family Gelechiidae. It is found in Mexico (Sonora) and the United States, where it has been recorded from Arizona.

The wingspan is about 15 mm. The forewings are hoary cinereous, profusely sprinkled and shaded with brownish fuscous, leaving an indistinct pale fluctuate fascia across the outer fifth. The outer third of the cell shows an elongate black streak, apparently composed of two spots connected by a line of black scales. The terminal and dorsal parts of the wing-surface are rather more suffused and less speckled than the costal portion. The hindwings are semitransparent, grey, shading to pale bronzy brownish along the margins and especially along the costa towards the apex.
