= Filatima ukrainica =

Scientific classification
- Kingdom: Animalia
- Phylum: Arthropoda
- Clade: Pancrustacea
- Class: Insecta
- Order: Lepidoptera
- Family: Gelechiidae
- Genus: Filatima
- Species: F. ukrainica

Binomial name
- Filatima ukrainica Piskunov, 1971

Species of moth

Filatima ukrainica is a moth of the family Gelechiidae. It is found in Gotland, Ukraine, Lithuania and Hungary.

The wingspan is 14–16 mm. The forewings are grey with four dark spots, three of which are ill-defined.
