= Filatima catacrossa =

Scientific classification
- Kingdom: Animalia
- Phylum: Arthropoda
- Class: Insecta
- Order: Lepidoptera
- Family: Gelechiidae
- Genus: Filatima
- Species: F. catacrossa

Binomial name
- Filatima catacrossa (Meyrick, 1927)

Synonyms
- Gelechia catacrossa Meyrick, 1927

Species of moth

Filatima catacrossa is a moth of the family Gelechiidae. It is found in North America, where it has been recorded from Texas and Arizona.

The wingspan is 17–19 mm. The forewings are fuscous suffusedly irrorated dark fuscous, in males almost always a broad band of brownish-ochreous suffusion on the costal area from the base to about three-fourths, but leaving the costal edge and often two or three streaks posteriorly dark, in females this suffusion is little developed. The stigmata in males are usually quite imperceptible, but in one dark example indicated by obscure whitish dots, in females sometimes visible, small, blackish, the plical linear, beneath the first discal. There is a small spot of whitish suffusion on the costa at three-fourths. The hindwings are light grey.
