= Filatima pravinominella =

Scientific classification
- Kingdom: Animalia
- Phylum: Arthropoda
- Clade: Pancrustacea
- Class: Insecta
- Order: Lepidoptera
- Family: Gelechiidae
- Genus: Filatima
- Species: F. pravinominella

Binomial name
- Filatima pravinominella (Chambers, 1878)

Synonyms
- Gelechia pravinominella Chambers, 1878; Gelechia quadrimaculella Chambers, 1875 (preocc. Chambers, 1874)

Species of moth

Filatima pravinominella is a moth of the family Gelechiidae. It is found in North America, where it has been recorded from Colorado.

The wings are dark brown, the forewings have four obscure darker brown spots, two of which are on the fold, the first one being the most obscure, one on the disc, and one at the end of the cell.
