= Filatima albicostella =

Scientific classification
- Domain: Eukaryota
- Kingdom: Animalia
- Phylum: Arthropoda
- Class: Insecta
- Order: Lepidoptera
- Family: Gelechiidae
- Genus: Filatima
- Species: F. albicostella

Binomial name
- Filatima albicostella Clarke, 1942

Species of moth

Filatima albicostella is a moth of the family Gelechiidae. It is found in North America, where it has been recorded from Washington, Kansas, Montana, Texas and Yukon.

The wingspan is 18–19 mm. The forewings are yellowish white strongly suffused and irrorated with fuscous, except for the costal edge, and with a purplish luster. There are a few ill-defined, blackish-fuscous streaks in the cell, on the basal half of the wing. The hindwings are light purplish fuscous, darker towards the margins.
