= Filatima albilorella =

Scientific classification
- Kingdom: Animalia
- Phylum: Arthropoda
- Clade: Pancrustacea
- Class: Insecta
- Order: Lepidoptera
- Family: Gelechiidae
- Genus: Filatima
- Species: F. albilorella

Binomial name
- Filatima albilorella (Zeller, 1873)

Synonyms
- Gelechia albilorella Zeller, 1873; Gelechia trifasciella Chambers, 1875

Species of moth

Filatima albilorella is a moth of the family Gelechiidae. It is found in North America, where it has been recorded from Arizona, Colorado, Florida, New Mexico and Texas.

The length of the forewings is 6 mm. The forewings are dark brown, with three distinct oblique white fascia, one about the basal fourth, one about the middle, and one just before the cilia, the first and third being frequently obsolete or interrupted in the middle. Adults are on wing from March to September.
