= Filatima albipectus =

Scientific classification
- Domain: Eukaryota
- Kingdom: Animalia
- Phylum: Arthropoda
- Class: Insecta
- Order: Lepidoptera
- Family: Gelechiidae
- Genus: Filatima
- Species: F. albipectus

Binomial name
- Filatima albipectus (Walsingham, 1911)

Synonyms
- Gelechia albipectus Walsingham, 1911; Fascista albipectus

Species of moth

Filatima albipectus is a moth of the family Gelechiidae. It is found in Mexico (Sonora) and the United States, where it has been recorded from California.

The wingspan is 14–15 mm. The forewings are pale brownish cinereous, sprinkled and smeared with fuscous, with a slight indication of four fuscous spots, one small one at one-fifth from the base, one in the fold and another on the disc a little beyond the latter and partially connected with it by fuscous scaling. The fourth is found at the end of the cell and the faintly indicated pale fascia on the outer fifth is scarcely bowed outward. The hindwings are brownish grey, more shaded with brown on their outer half.
