= Filatima obscurosuffusella =

Scientific classification
- Kingdom: Animalia
- Phylum: Arthropoda
- Clade: Pancrustacea
- Class: Insecta
- Order: Lepidoptera
- Family: Gelechiidae
- Genus: Filatima
- Species: F. obscurosuffusella

Binomial name
- Filatima obscurosuffusella (Chambers, 1878)

Synonyms
- Gelechia obscurosuffusella Chambers, 1878; Gelechia canopulvella Chambers, 1878; Gelechia monopa Meyrick, 1927; Gelechia epigypsa Meyrick, 1927

Species of moth

Filatima obscurosuffusella is a moth of the family Gelechiidae. It is found in North America, where it has been recorded from Texas.

The wingspan is 15–17 mm. The forewings are grey-whitish with scattered black specks. The first discal stigma is rather large, black, surrounded with clearer white suffusion, the plical and second discal usually only indicated by whiter suffusion, seldom by minute black dots, the plical obliquely before the first discal. There is an angulated whiter subterminal shade sometimes visible. The hindwings are light grey.
