= Filatima occidua =

Scientific classification
- Kingdom: Animalia
- Phylum: Arthropoda
- Clade: Pancrustacea
- Class: Insecta
- Order: Lepidoptera
- Family: Gelechiidae
- Genus: Filatima
- Species: F. occidua

Binomial name
- Filatima occidua Hodges & Adamski, 1997

Species of moth

Filatima occidua is a moth of the family Gelechiidae. It is found in North America, where it has been recorded from Washington and California.

The length of the forewings is 5.5-6.2 mm.

The larvae on Lupinus sericeus var. sericeus and Lupinus ornatus.

== Etymology ==
The species name refers to its distribution and is derived from Latin occiduus (meaning setting [of the sun]).
