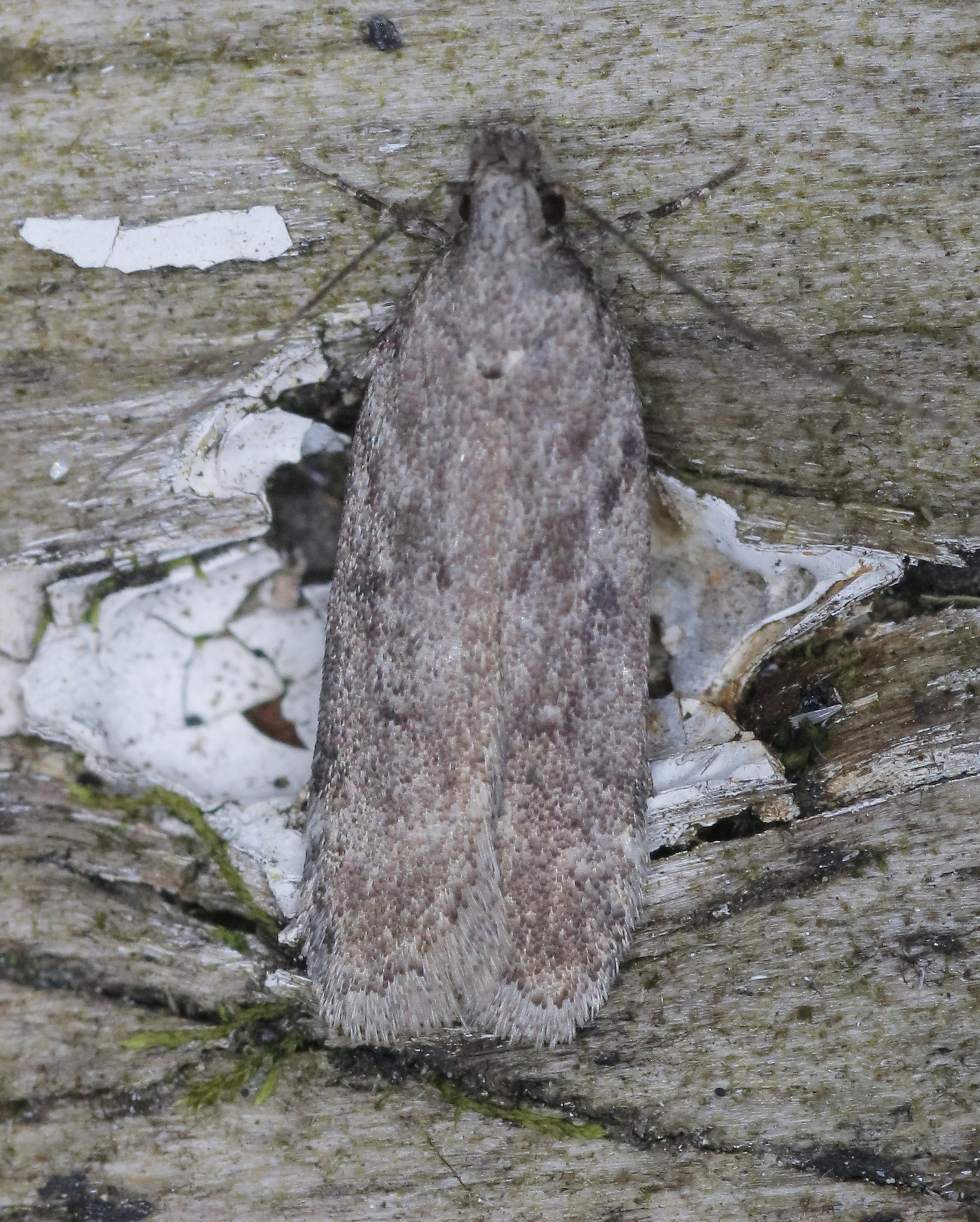

Scientific classification
- Kingdom: Animalia
- Phylum: Arthropoda
- Class: Insecta
- Order: Lepidoptera
- Family: Gelechiidae
- Genus: Filatima
- Species: F. vaccinii

Binomial name
- Filatima vaccinii Clarke, 1947

= Filatima vaccinii =

Species of moth

Filatima vaccinii is a species of moth in the family Gelechiidae. It is found in North America, where it has been recorded from Alberta, British Columbia, Manitoba and New Jersey.

The wingspan is 16–18 mm. The forewings are grey, each scale tipped with fuscous and with four small fuscous spots on the fold and in the cell. There is an ill-defined narrow, outwardly convex transverse fascia at the apical fourth, from the costa to the tornus. The hindwings are fuscous with a brassy hue, darker apically than basally.

The larvae feed on Vaccinium vacillans.
