= Filatima adamsi =

Scientific classification
- Kingdom: Animalia
- Phylum: Arthropoda
- Clade: Pancrustacea
- Class: Insecta
- Order: Lepidoptera
- Family: Gelechiidae
- Genus: Filatima
- Species: F. adamsi

Binomial name
- Filatima adamsi Hodges & Adamski, 1997

Species of moth

Filatima adamsi is a moth of the family Gelechiidae. It is found in North America, where it has been recorded from Maine.
