= Filatima rhypodes =

Scientific classification
- Kingdom: Animalia
- Phylum: Arthropoda
- Class: Insecta
- Order: Lepidoptera
- Family: Gelechiidae
- Genus: Filatima
- Species: F. rhypodes

Binomial name
- Filatima rhypodes (Walsingham, 1911)

Synonyms
- Gelechia rhypodes Walsingham, 1911

Species of moth

Filatima rhypodes is a moth of the family Gelechiidae. It is found in Mexico (Sonora).

This species has a wingspan of approximately 14 mm. The forewings are stone-white, with sparse blackish scales beyond the basal fourth. Notable features include a discal spot before the middle, a spot at the end of the cell, and another in the fold, slightly preceding the first. These spots are only slightly more prominent than the smaller groups and scattered scales found towards the tornus and along the termen, which extend slightly into the cilia. The hindwings are whitish-grey, gradually darkening toward the apex.
