= Filatima abactella =

Scientific classification
- Domain: Eukaryota
- Kingdom: Animalia
- Phylum: Arthropoda
- Class: Insecta
- Order: Lepidoptera
- Family: Gelechiidae
- Genus: Filatima
- Species: F. abactella

Binomial name
- Filatima abactella (Clarke, 1932)

Synonyms
- Gelechia abactella Clarke, 1932

Species of moth

Filatima abactella is a moth of the family Gelechiidae. It is found in North America, where it has been recorded from Alberta, British Columbia, New Brunswick, New Mexico, Ontario, Quebec and Wyoming.
