= Filatima lapidescens =

Scientific classification
- Kingdom: Animalia
- Phylum: Arthropoda
- Class: Insecta
- Order: Lepidoptera
- Family: Gelechiidae
- Genus: Filatima
- Species: F. lapidescens

Binomial name
- Filatima lapidescens (Meyrick, 1916)

Synonyms
- Gelechia lapidescens Meyrick, 1916; Gelechia lithodes Walsingham, 1911 (preocc. Meyrick, 1886)

Species of moth

Filatima lapidescens is a moth of the family Gelechiidae. It is found in Mexico (Sonora).

The wingspan is about 15 millimetres (0.59 in). The forewings are stone-grey, sparsely dusted with blackish atoms, especially along the margins and on the base of the pale stone-grey cilia, a very few ochreous scales lying along the middle of the fold. The veins beyond the cell are slightly indicated by darkened scaling. The hindwings are pale leaden grey, with a brownish tinge beyond the middle.
