= Filatima hemicrossa =

Scientific classification
- Kingdom: Animalia
- Phylum: Arthropoda
- Class: Insecta
- Order: Lepidoptera
- Family: Gelechiidae
- Genus: Filatima
- Species: F. hemicrossa

Binomial name
- Filatima hemicrossa (Meyrick, 1927)

Synonyms
- Gelechia hemicrossa Meyrick, 1927

Species of moth

Filatima hemicrossa is a moth of the family Gelechiidae. It is found in North America, where it has been recorded from Texas, Montana and Florida.

The wingspan is 20–21 mm. The forewings are pale grey sprinkled dark grey, partially tinged whitish between the veins, the veins marked with distinct lines of blackish irroration, and the lower two-thirds of the cell forming an irregular-edged but well-defined area darker than the rest of the wing. There is an oblique mark of blackish irroration beneath the costa at one-fourth. The hindwings are pale grey. Adults are on wing from April to May.
