= Filatima bigella =

Scientific classification
- Domain: Eukaryota
- Kingdom: Animalia
- Phylum: Arthropoda
- Class: Insecta
- Order: Lepidoptera
- Family: Gelechiidae
- Genus: Filatima
- Species: F. bigella

Binomial name
- Filatima bigella (Busck, 1913)

Synonyms
- Gelechia bigella Busck, 1913; Gelechia spilosella Barnes & Busck, 1920

Species of moth

Filatima bigella is a moth of the family Gelechiidae. It is found in North America, where it has been recorded from Texas and Arizona.

The wingspan is 20–21 mm. The forewings are dark velvety fuscous with two velvety black round dots, one on the middle of the fold and one obliquely above it on the cell, both slightly edged with rust-brown scales. There is a small rust-brown spot at the end of the cell, containing a few single black scales, a small blackish costal spot at the apical third and an ill-defined marginal row of black around the apical and terminal edges. The hindwings are dark fuscous.
