= Filatima asiatica =

Scientific classification
- Kingdom: Animalia
- Phylum: Arthropoda
- Clade: Pancrustacea
- Class: Insecta
- Order: Lepidoptera
- Family: Gelechiidae
- Genus: Filatima
- Species: F. asiatica

Binomial name
- Filatima asiatica Sattler, 1961

Species of moth

Filatima asiatica is a moth of the family Gelechiidae. It is found in New Guinea, where it has been recorded from the Prince Alexander Mountains.
