= Filatima pagicola =

Scientific classification
- Kingdom: Animalia
- Phylum: Arthropoda
- Class: Insecta
- Order: Lepidoptera
- Family: Gelechiidae
- Genus: Filatima
- Species: F. pagicola

Binomial name
- Filatima pagicola (Meyrick, 1936)

Synonyms
- Gelechia pagicola Meyrick, 1936

Species of moth

Filatima pagicola is a moth of the family Gelechiidae. It is found in China.
