= Filatima natalis =

Scientific classification
- Kingdom: Animalia
- Phylum: Arthropoda
- Clade: Pancrustacea
- Class: Insecta
- Order: Lepidoptera
- Family: Gelechiidae
- Genus: Filatima
- Species: F. natalis

Binomial name
- Filatima natalis (Heinrich, 1920)

Synonyms
- Gelechia natalis Heinrich, 1920

Species of moth

Filatima natalis is a moth of the family Gelechiidae. It is found in North America, where it has been recorded from Arizona, Colorado and Oregon.

The wingspan is 17–20 mm. The forewings are white scaled, with the tips of the scales bluish. The costa is lighter than the rest of the wing near the base and there is a faint streak of dark scaling on the basal fourth of the costa, as well as a similar spot on the outer third of the costa. Near the base of the cell, before the middle a faint dark streak, and two dark spots in the cell on its outer costal margin, there often fusing and forming a single short, indistinct, longitudinal streak. The hindwings are pale, somewhat smoky towards the apex and along the veins.

The larvae feed on Arceuthobium vaginatum.
