= Filatima transsilvanella =

Scientific classification
- Domain: Eukaryota
- Kingdom: Animalia
- Phylum: Arthropoda
- Class: Insecta
- Order: Lepidoptera
- Family: Gelechiidae
- Genus: Filatima
- Species: F. transsilvanella

Binomial name
- Filatima transsilvanella Z. Kovács & S. Kovács, 2001

Species of moth

Filatima transsilvanella is a moth of the family Gelechiidae. It is found in Transylvania in Romania and the southern Ural Mountains in Russia.
