= Filatima angustipennis =

Scientific classification
- Kingdom: Animalia
- Phylum: Arthropoda
- Class: Insecta
- Order: Lepidoptera
- Family: Gelechiidae
- Genus: Filatima
- Species: F. angustipennis

Binomial name
- Filatima angustipennis Sattler, 1961

Species of moth

Filatima angustipennis is a moth of the family Gelechiidae. It is found in southern France.
