= Filatima obscuroocelella =

Scientific classification
- Kingdom: Animalia
- Phylum: Arthropoda
- Clade: Pancrustacea
- Class: Insecta
- Order: Lepidoptera
- Family: Gelechiidae
- Genus: Filatima
- Species: F. obscuroocelella

Binomial name
- Filatima obscuroocelella (Chambers, 1875)

Synonyms
- Gelechia obscuroocelella Chambers, 1875; Filatima obscuroocellella

Species of moth

Filatima obscuroocelella is a moth of the family Gelechiidae. It is found in North America, where it has been recorded from Texas.

There are three obscure brownish ochreous spots on the forewing, one of which is on the disc, another near it on the fold, and the third at the end of the cell, this last having an indistinct annulus around it.
