= Filatima depuratella =

Scientific classification
- Domain: Eukaryota
- Kingdom: Animalia
- Phylum: Arthropoda
- Class: Insecta
- Order: Lepidoptera
- Family: Gelechiidae
- Genus: Filatima
- Species: F. depuratella

Binomial name
- Filatima depuratella (Busck, 1910)

Synonyms
- Gelechia depuratella Busck, 1910

Species of moth

Filatima depuratella is a moth of the family Gelechiidae. It is found in North America, where it has been recorded from Arizona and New Mexico.

The wingspan is about 17 mm. The forewings are ochreous white suffused with light yellow, especially on the apical half. There is a large oblique blackish spot on the middle of the cell, nearest the costa at its basal end and followed by a small blackish dot at the end of the cell. Just above it, the costal edge is sprinkled with black and there is a small blackish costal spot at the apical third. The extreme tip of the wing is sprinkled with black. The hindwings are whitish fuscous, darkest towards the tip and with a few black scales in the apical cilia.
