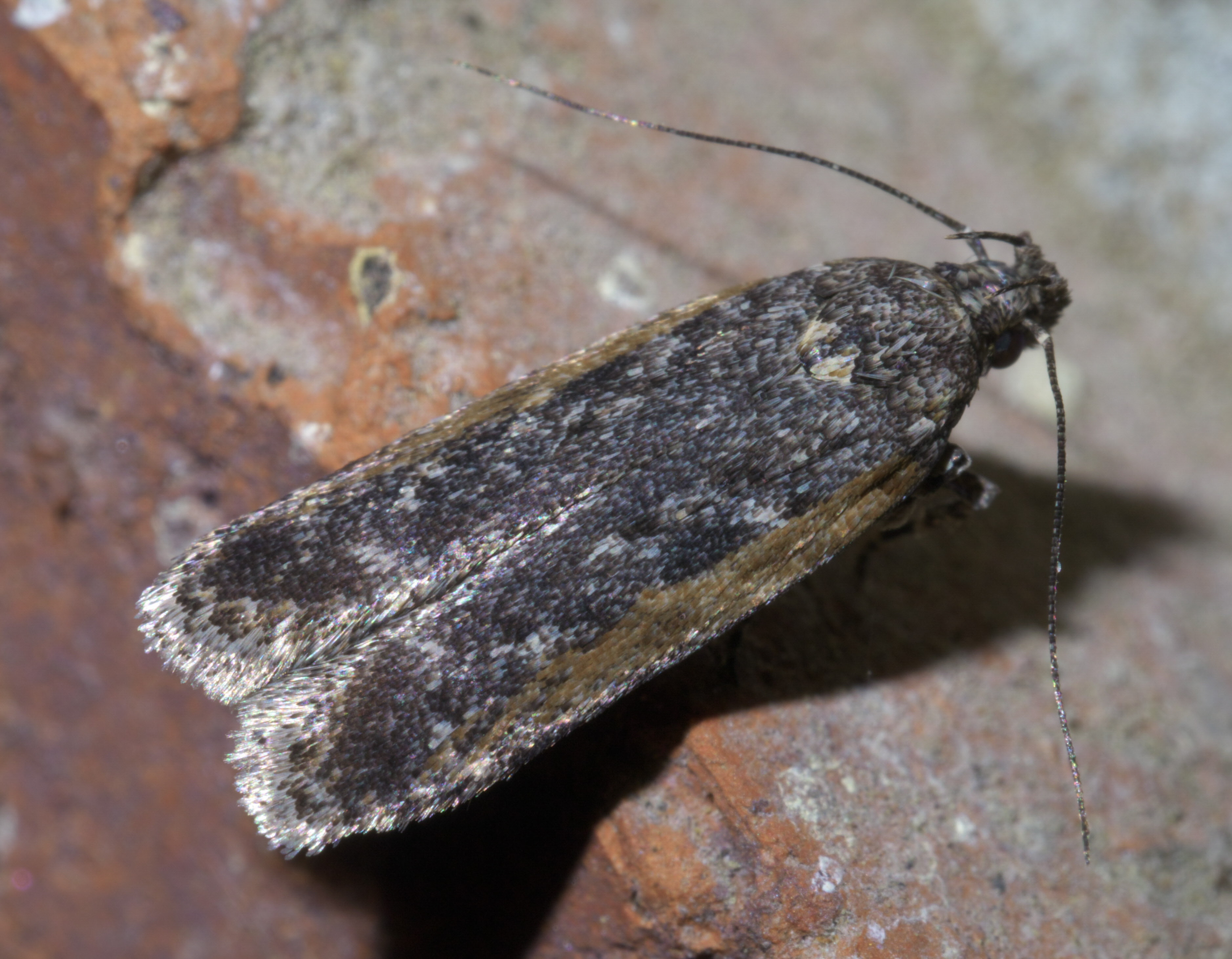

Scientific classification
- Domain: Eukaryota
- Kingdom: Animalia
- Phylum: Arthropoda
- Class: Insecta
- Order: Lepidoptera
- Family: Gelechiidae
- Genus: Filatima
- Species: F. serotinella

Binomial name
- Filatima serotinella (Busck, 1903)

Synonyms
- Gelechia serotinella Busck, 1903

= Filatima serotinella =

Species of moth

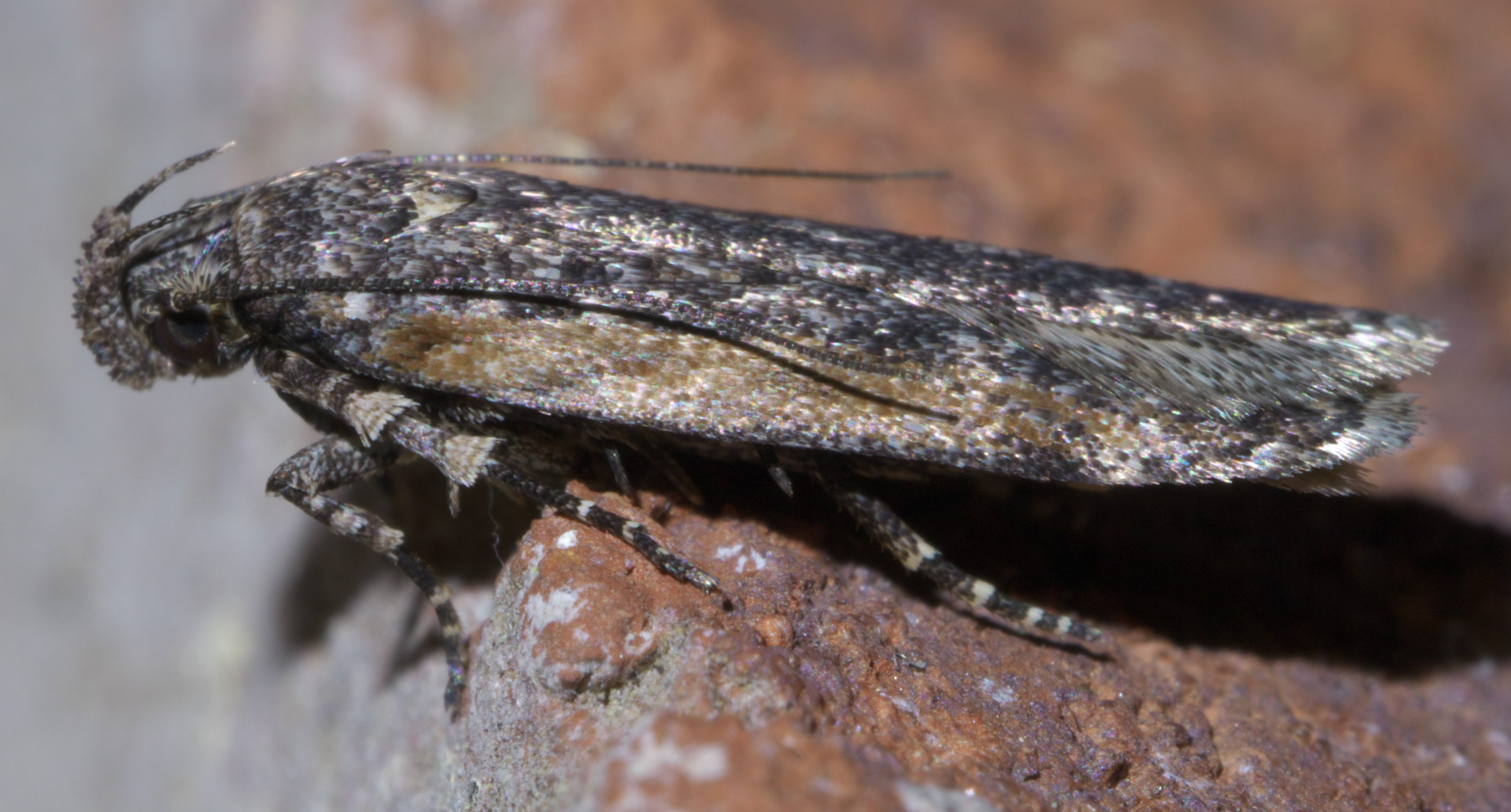
Filatima serotinella, Hodges #2172, Size: 11.1 mm

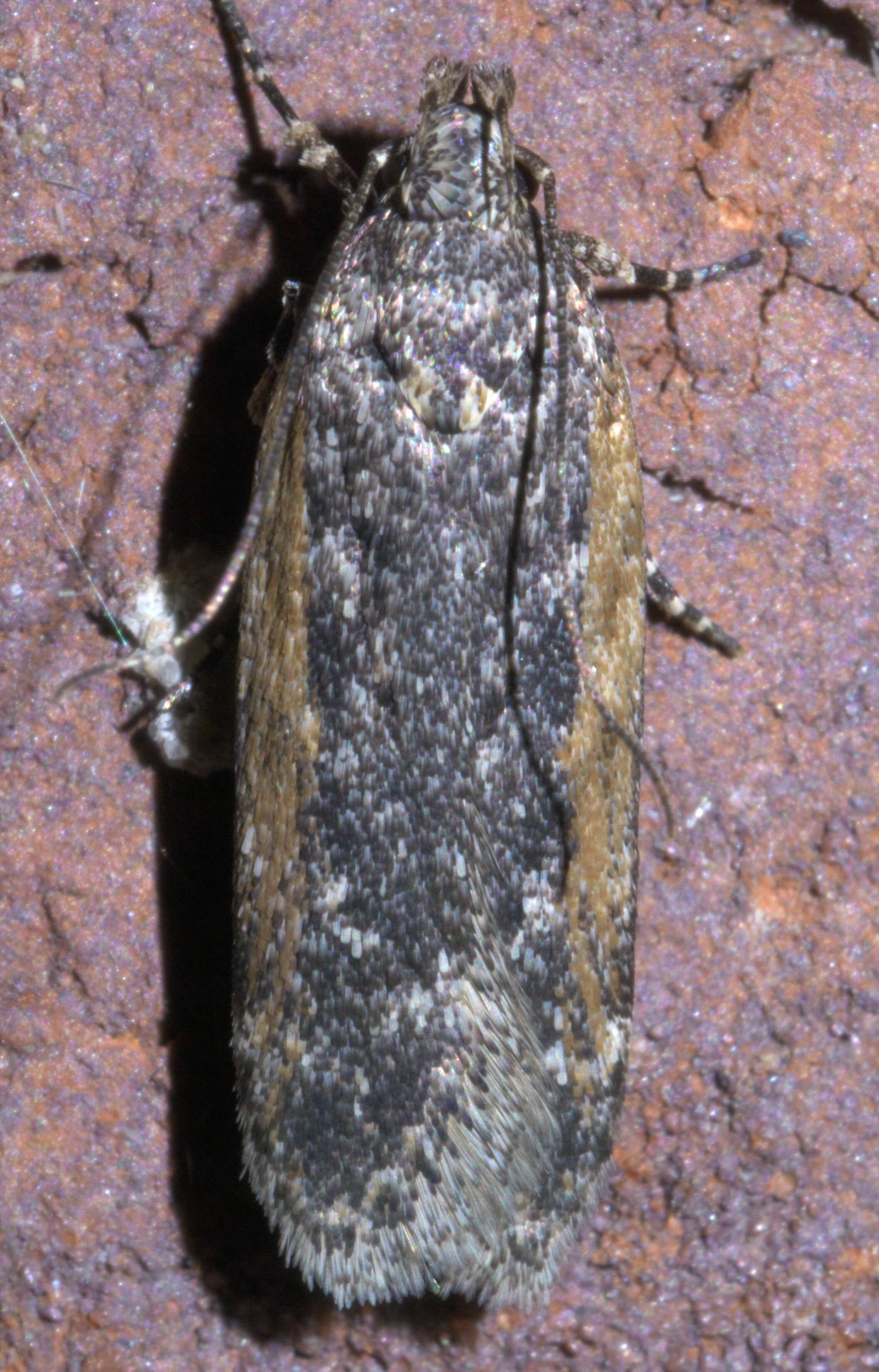
Filatima serotinella, Hodges #2172, Size: 11.2 mm

Filatima serotinella is a moth of the family Gelechiidae. It is found in North America, where it has been recorded from Alabama, Alberta, Arkansas, Colorado, Illinois, Indiana, Kansas, Kentucky, Louisiana, Maine, Maryland, Mississippi, South Carolina, Tennessee, Texas and West Virginia.

The wingspan is 16–21 mm. The forewings are dark, black and white scales irregularly mixed, but the black prevailing. There are dark-brown scales in a narrow longitudinal streak along, but below the costal edge, giving that part of the wing a perceptible chocolate-brown shade. At the end of this streak, at the apical fourth, the white scales congregate in an ill-defined costal white spot, which is connected with an opposite equally ill-defined dorsal white spot by a wavering interrupted narrow white fascia. The hindwings are dark shining fuscous. Adults are on wing from March to October.

The larvae feed on Prunus serotina.
