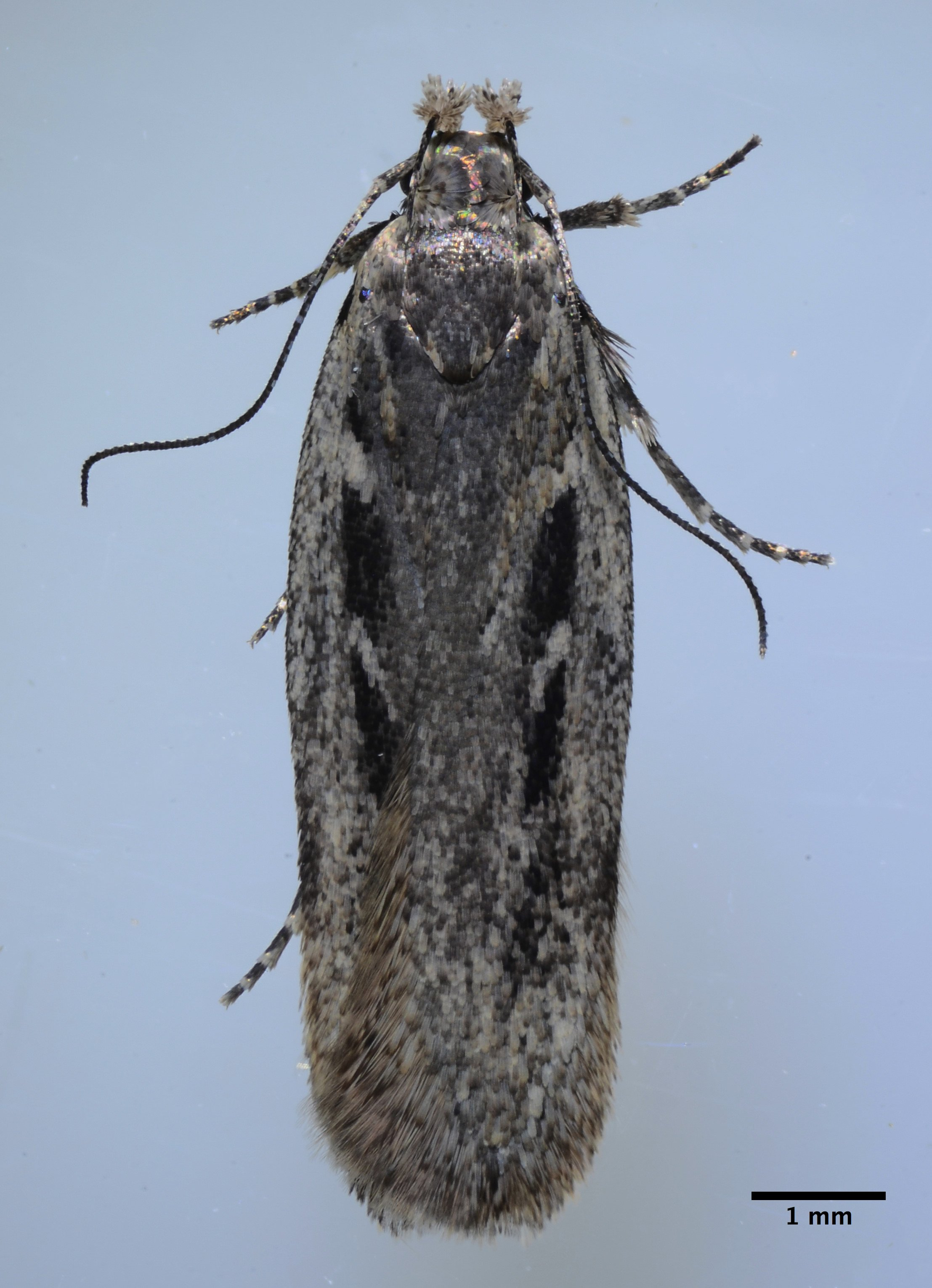
- Filatima obidenna

Scientific classification
- Kingdom: Animalia
- Phylum: Arthropoda
- Class: Insecta
- Order: Lepidoptera
- Family: Gelechiidae
- Tribe: Gelechiini
- Genus: Filatima; Busck, 1939

= Filatima =

Genus of moths

Filatima is a genus of moths in the family Gelechiidae.

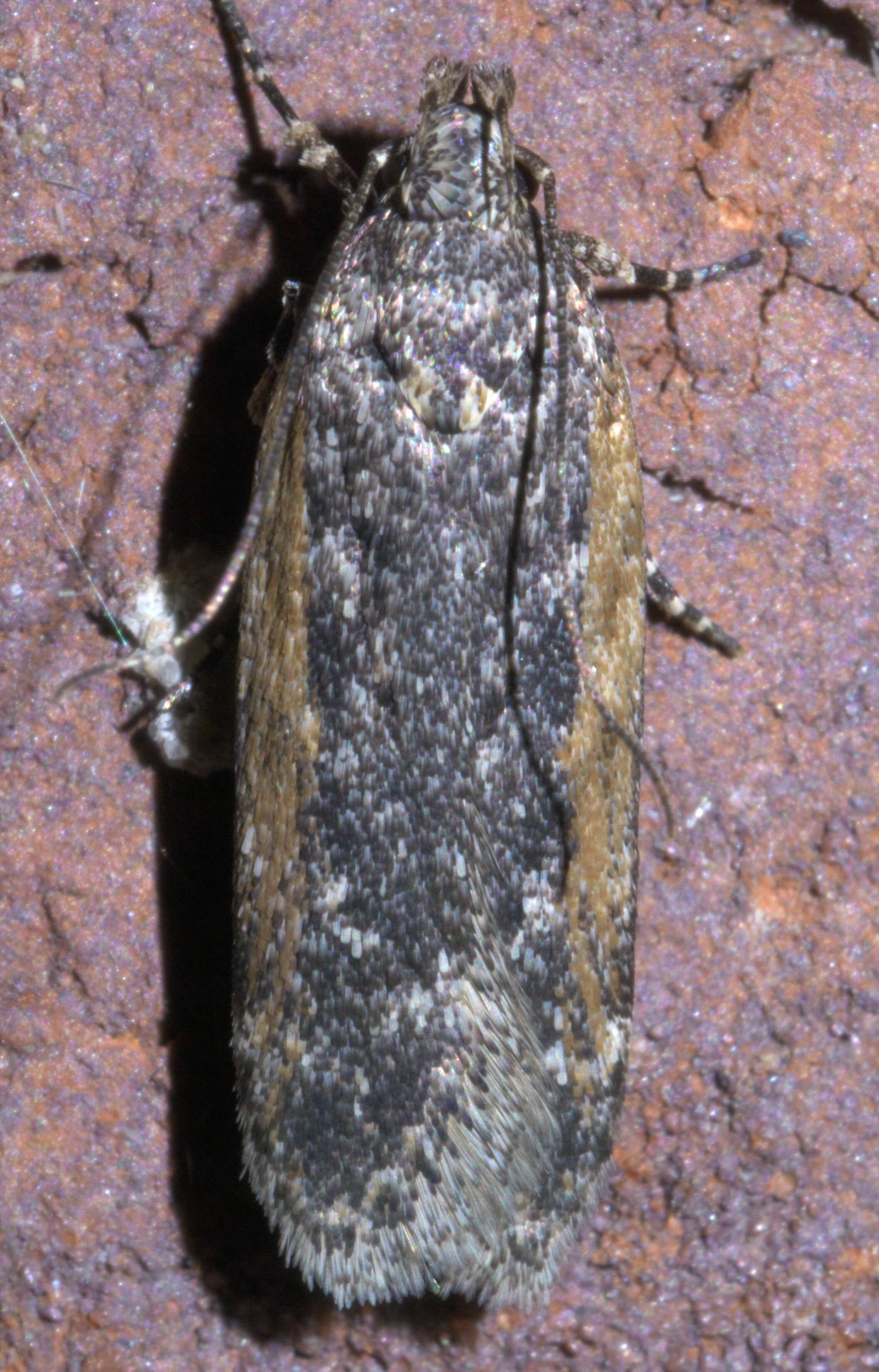
Filatima serotinella

== Biology ==
In November 2005, an infestation of Filatima caterpillars was found to be stunting the revegetation activity of land destroyed by the eruption of Mount St. Helens in Washington.

== Species ==
- Filatima abactella (Clarke, 1932)
- Filatima adamsi Hodges & Adamski, 1997
- Filatima albicostella Clarke, 1942
- Filatima albilorella (Zeller, 1873)
- Filatima albipectus (Walsingham, 1911)
- Filatima angustipennis Sattler, 1961
- Filatima arizonella (Busck, 1903)
- Filatima asiatica Sattler, 1961
- Filatima aulaea (Clarke, 1932)
- Filatima autocrossa (Meyrick, 1937)
- Filatima betulae Clarke, 1947
- Filatima biforella (Busck, 1909)
- Filatima bigella (Busck, 1913)
- Filatima biminimaculella (Chambers, 1880)
- Filatima catacrossa (Meyrick, 1927)
- Filatima collinearis (Meyrick, 1927)
- Filatima confusatella (Darlington, 1949)
- Filatima cushmani Clarke, 1942
- Filatima demissae (Keifer, 1931)
- Filatima depuratella (Busck, 1910)
- Filatima djakovica Anikin & Piskunov, 1996
- Filatima epulatrix Hodges, 1969
- Filatima fontisella Lvovsky & Piskunov, 1989
- Filatima frugalis (Braun, 1925)
- Filatima fuliginea (Meyrick, 1929)
- Filatima glycyrhizaeella (Chambers, 1877)
- Filatima golovina Clarke, 1947
- Filatima gomphopis (Meyrick, 1927)
- Filatima hemicrossa (Meyrick, 1927)
- Filatima incomptella (Herrich-Schaffer, 1854)
- Filatima inquilinella (Busck, 1910)
- Filatima isocrossa (Meyrick, 1927)
- Filatima karsholti Ivinskis & Piskunov, 1989
- Filatima kerzhneri Ivinskis & Piskunov, 1989
- Filatima lapidescens (Meyrick, 1916)
- Filatima loowita Adamski, 2009
- Filatima monotaeniella (Bottimer, 1926)
- Filatima natalis (Heinrich, 1920)
- Filatima neotrophella (Heinrich, 1921)
- Filatima nigripectus (Walsingham, 1911)
- Filatima normifera (Meyrick, 1927)
- Filatima nucifer (Walsingham, 1911)
- Filatima obidenna Clarke, 1947
- Filatima obscuroocelella (Chambers, 1875)
- Filatima obscurosuffusella (Chambers, 1878)
- Filatima occidua Hodges & Adamski, 1997
- Filatima ochreosuffusella (Chambers, 1874)
- Filatima ornatifimbriella (Clemens, 1864)
- Filatima pagicola (Meyrick, 1936)
- Filatima pallipalpella (Snellen, 1884)
- Filatima perpensa Clarke, 1947
- Filatima persicaeella (Murtfeldt, 1899)
- Filatima platyochra Clarke, 1947
- Filatima pravinominella (Chambers, 1878)
- Filatima procedes Clarke, 1947
- Filatima prognosticata (Braun, 1925)
- Filatima pseudacaciella (Chambers, 1872)
- Filatima revisensis Harrison & Berenbaum, 2013
- Filatima rhypodes (Walsingham, 1911)
- Filatima roceliella Clarke, 1942
- Filatima saliciphaga (Keifer, 1937)
- Filatima sciocrypta (Meyrick, 1936)
- Filatima serotinella (Busck, 1903)
- Filatima shastaella (Gaede, 1937)
- Filatima sperryi Clarke, 1947
- Filatima spinigera Clarke, 1947
- Filatima spurcella (Duponchel, 1843)
- Filatima striatella (Busck, 1903)
- Filatima tephrinopa (Meyrick, 1929)
- Filatima tephritidella (Duponchel, 1844)
- Filatima textorella (Chretien, 1908)
- Filatima transsilvanella Z. Kovacs & S. Kovács, 2002
- Filatima tridentata Clarke, 1947
- Filatima ukrainica Piskunov, 1971
- Filatima vaccinii Clarke, 1947
- Filatima vaniae Clarke, 1947
- Filatima xanthuris (Meyrick, 1927)
- Filatima zagulajevi Anikin & Piskunov, 1996
