= Filatima platyochra =

Scientific classification
- Kingdom: Animalia
- Phylum: Arthropoda
- Clade: Pancrustacea
- Class: Insecta
- Order: Lepidoptera
- Family: Gelechiidae
- Genus: Filatima
- Species: F. platyochra

Binomial name
- Filatima platyochra Clarke, 1947

Species of moth

Filatima platyochra is a moth of the family Gelechiidae. It is found in North America, where it has been recorded from California.

The wingspan is 17–18 mm.
