= Filatima pallipalpella =

Scientific classification
- Kingdom: Animalia
- Phylum: Arthropoda
- Clade: Pancrustacea
- Class: Insecta
- Order: Lepidoptera
- Family: Gelechiidae
- Genus: Filatima
- Species: F. pallipalpella

Binomial name
- Filatima pallipalpella (Snellen, 1884)

Synonyms
- Gelechia pallipalpella Snellen, 1884; Gelechia autocrossa Meyrick, 1937; Filatima autocrossa – Bidzylia, 2000

Species of moth

Filatima pallipalpella is a moth of the family Gelechiidae. It is found in Russia (the Russian Far East and the Volga region), China (Shandong), and Kyrgyzstan.

== Description ==
The wingspan is 16–17 mm. The forewings are dark brownish-grey with a rust-yellow ringed dot at the fold. Above this, at two-fifths an ill-defined double rust-yellow cross-line with a similar line on the vein. The hindwings are dark grey.
