= Filatima inquilinella =

Scientific classification
- Domain: Eukaryota
- Kingdom: Animalia
- Phylum: Arthropoda
- Class: Insecta
- Order: Lepidoptera
- Family: Gelechiidae
- Genus: Filatima
- Species: F. inquilinella

Binomial name
- Filatima inquilinella (Busck, 1910)

Synonyms
- Gelechia inquilinella Busck, 1910

Species of moth

Filatima inquilinella is a moth of the family Gelechiidae. It is found in North America, where it has been recorded from New York and Maine.

The wingspan is 14–15 mm. The forewings are whitish, heavily overlaid with bluish-black and dark fuscous scales. There is a small, obscure, ill-defined black spot on the middle of the cell and there are similar equally obscure black spots on the fold below and at the end of the cell, both slightly edged by a few dark ochreous scales. The hindwings are light shining fuscous.

Larvae have been recorded feeding within galls on Salix species.
