= Filatima normifera =

Scientific classification
- Kingdom: Animalia
- Phylum: Arthropoda
- Clade: Pancrustacea
- Class: Insecta
- Order: Lepidoptera
- Family: Gelechiidae
- Genus: Filatima
- Species: F. normifera

Binomial name
- Filatima normifera (Meyrick, 1927)

Synonyms
- Gelechia normifera Meyrick, 1927

Species of moth

Filatima normifera is a moth of the family Gelechiidae. It is found in North America, where it has been recorded from Texas and Wyoming.

The wingspan is 18–25 mm. The forewings are greyish more or less sprinkled or irrorated dark fuscous, sometimes tinged or irrorated whitish, or partially streaked ochreous-brown especially towards the costa and posteriorly. The stigmata are blackish, usually more or less circled ochreous, the discal moderate, the plical usually linear, rather before the first discal. There is a faint whitish angulated line at four-fifths sometimes perceptible. The hindwings are light bluish-grey.
