= Filatima biforella =

Scientific classification
- Domain: Eukaryota
- Kingdom: Animalia
- Phylum: Arthropoda
- Class: Insecta
- Order: Lepidoptera
- Family: Gelechiidae
- Genus: Filatima
- Species: F. biforella

Binomial name
- Filatima biforella (Busck, 1909)

Synonyms
- Gelechia biforella Busck, 1909; Gelechia promonitrix Meyrick, 1927

Species of moth

Filatima biforella is a moth of the family Gelechiidae. It is found in North America, where it has been recorded from Texas.

The wingspan is 17–18 mm. The forewings are whitish-grey or grey with slight blackish subcostal and subdorsal marks near the base and with black discal blotches before the middle of the wing and on the end of the cell, slightly edged whitish or brownish, the first transverse-oval, sometimes broken into two, the second inverted-triangular. There is a small suffused white spot on the costa at three-fourths, sometimes nearly obsolete. The hindwings are grey or light grey.
