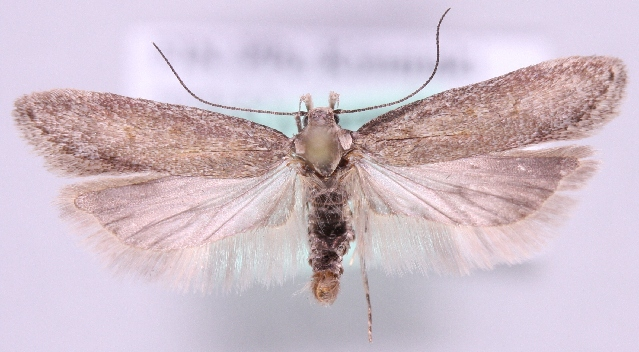

Scientific classification
- Domain: Eukaryota
- Kingdom: Animalia
- Phylum: Arthropoda
- Class: Insecta
- Order: Lepidoptera
- Family: Gelechiidae
- Genus: Filatima
- Species: F. incomptella

Binomial name
- Filatima incomptella (Herrich-Schäffer, 1854)

Synonyms
- Gelechia incomptella Herrich-Schäffer, 1854; Gelechia turbidella Nolcken, 1871

= Filatima incomptella =

Species of moth

Filatima incomptella is a moth of the family Gelechiidae. It is found in Scandinavia, the Baltic region, Germany, Poland, European Russia and Siberia (Transbaikal).

The wingspan is 14–16 mm.

The larvae feed on Salix caprea and Salix repens.
