= Filatima sciocrypta =

Scientific classification
- Kingdom: Animalia
- Phylum: Arthropoda
- Class: Insecta
- Order: Lepidoptera
- Family: Gelechiidae
- Genus: Filatima
- Species: F. sciocrypta

Binomial name
- Filatima sciocrypta (Meyrick, 1936)

Synonyms
- Gelechia sciocrypta Meyrick, 1936; Gelechia digrapta Meyrick, 1936; Gelechia demophila Meyrick, 1936

Species of moth

Filatima sciocrypta is a moth of the family Gelechiidae. It is found in China (Shandong, Jilin).
