= Filatima demissae =

Scientific classification
- Domain: Eukaryota
- Kingdom: Animalia
- Phylum: Arthropoda
- Class: Insecta
- Order: Lepidoptera
- Family: Gelechiidae
- Genus: Filatima
- Species: F. demissae

Binomial name
- Filatima demissae (Keifer, 1931)

Synonyms
- Gelechia demissae Keifer, 1931

Species of moth

Filatima demissae is a moth of the family Gelechiidae. It is found in North America, where it has been recorded from California and Arizona.
