= Filatima roceliella =

Scientific classification
- Kingdom: Animalia
- Phylum: Arthropoda
- Class: Insecta
- Order: Lepidoptera
- Family: Gelechiidae
- Genus: Filatima
- Species: F. roceliella

Binomial name
- Filatima roceliella Clarke, 1942

Species of moth

Filatima roceliella is a moth of the family Gelechiidae. It is found in North America, where it has been recorded from Washington.

The wingspan is about 17 mm. The forewings have a distinct, median, longitudinal fuscous streak suffused and irrorated with light ochreous. There are longitudinal ochreous streaks along the veins. The hindwings are pale fuscous.
