= Filatima loowita =

Scientific classification
- Kingdom: Animalia
- Phylum: Arthropoda
- Clade: Pancrustacea
- Class: Insecta
- Order: Lepidoptera
- Family: Gelechiidae
- Genus: Filatima
- Species: F. loowita

Binomial name
- Filatima loowita Adamski, 2009

Species of moth

Filatima loowita is a moth of the family Gelechiidae. It is found in the United States, where it has been recorded from Washington.

The length of the forewings is 7.3–10.9 mm. The forewings are pale gray intermixed with some scales tipped with dark gray and a few grayish orange scales. The hindwings are pale gray.

The larvae feed on Lupinus lepidus. Young larvae mine the leaves of their host plant, while older larvae move outside of the leaf-mines and incorporate entire leaflets and leaves into their silken feeding tunnels. They have a smooth, pale grayish green body and dark reddish brown head. They reach a length of 8.2-15.1 mm.

== Etymology ==
The species name is derived from Loowit, a name for Mount St. Helens used by the native peoples of the Pacific northwest region of the United States.
