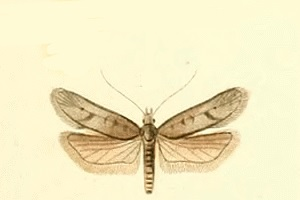

Scientific classification
- Kingdom: Animalia
- Phylum: Arthropoda
- Class: Insecta
- Order: Lepidoptera
- Family: Gelechiidae
- Genus: Filatima
- Species: F. tephritidella

Binomial name
- Filatima tephritidella (Duponchel, 1844)

Synonyms
- Anacampsis tephritidella Duponchel, 1844; Gelechia tephriditella Herrich-Schäffer, 1854

= Filatima tephritidella =

Species of moth

Filatima tephritidella is a moth of the family Gelechiidae. It is found in France, Austria, Slovakia, Italy, Hungary, Romania, Poland, North Macedonia, Ukraine and Russia.
