= Filatima cushmani =

Scientific classification
- Domain: Eukaryota
- Kingdom: Animalia
- Phylum: Arthropoda
- Class: Insecta
- Order: Lepidoptera
- Family: Gelechiidae
- Genus: Filatima
- Species: F. cushmani

Binomial name
- Filatima cushmani Clarke, 1942

Species of moth

Filatima cushmani is a moth of the family Gelechiidae. It is found in North America, where it has been recorded from Washington.

The wingspan is 18–22 mm. The forewings are greyish buff with a bronzy iridescence. There is a broken blackish-fuscous line from the costa, near the base, an ill-defined, outwardly oblique and another similar ill-defined line to the center of the cell from the costa at the basal fifth, then longitudinally to the end of the cell. There is a faint indication of a blackish-fuscous spot at the apical third on the costa. A fine, broken, ochreous, longitudinal line is found on the costal fold, from the base to the basal third and there are two distinct, dull-yellowish spots in the cell, with mixed ochreous and black scales. The hindwings are light greyish fuscous.
