= Filatima tephrinopa =

Scientific classification
- Kingdom: Animalia
- Phylum: Arthropoda
- Class: Insecta
- Order: Lepidoptera
- Family: Gelechiidae
- Genus: Filatima
- Species: F. tephrinopa

Binomial name
- Filatima tephrinopa (Meyrick, 1929)

Synonyms
- Nothris tephrinopa Meyrick, 1929

Species of moth

Filatima tephrinopa is a moth of the family Gelechiidae. It is found in North America, where it has been recorded from Texas.

The wingspan is 15–17 mm.
