= Filatima autocrossa =

Scientific classification
- Kingdom: Animalia
- Phylum: Arthropoda
- Class: Insecta
- Order: Lepidoptera
- Family: Gelechiidae
- Genus: Filatima
- Species: F. autocrossa

Binomial name
- Filatima autocrossa (Meyrick, 1937)

Synonyms
- Gelechia autocrossa Meyrick, 1937

Species of moth

Filatima autocrossa is a moth of the family Gelechiidae. It is found in China, the southern Ural Mountains, the lower Volga region, the Altai Mountains, the Tuva region, the Chita region and the Krasnoyarsk region.

The wingspan is 17–20 mm.
