= Filatima procedes =

Scientific classification
- Domain: Eukaryota
- Kingdom: Animalia
- Phylum: Arthropoda
- Class: Insecta
- Order: Lepidoptera
- Family: Gelechiidae
- Genus: Filatima
- Species: F. procedes

Binomial name
- Filatima procedes Clarke, 1947

Species of moth

Filatima procedes is a moth of the family Gelechiidae. It is found in North America, where it has been recorded from Indiana, Michigan and Texas.

The wingspan is 18–20 mm.

The larvae feed on Salix exiqua.
