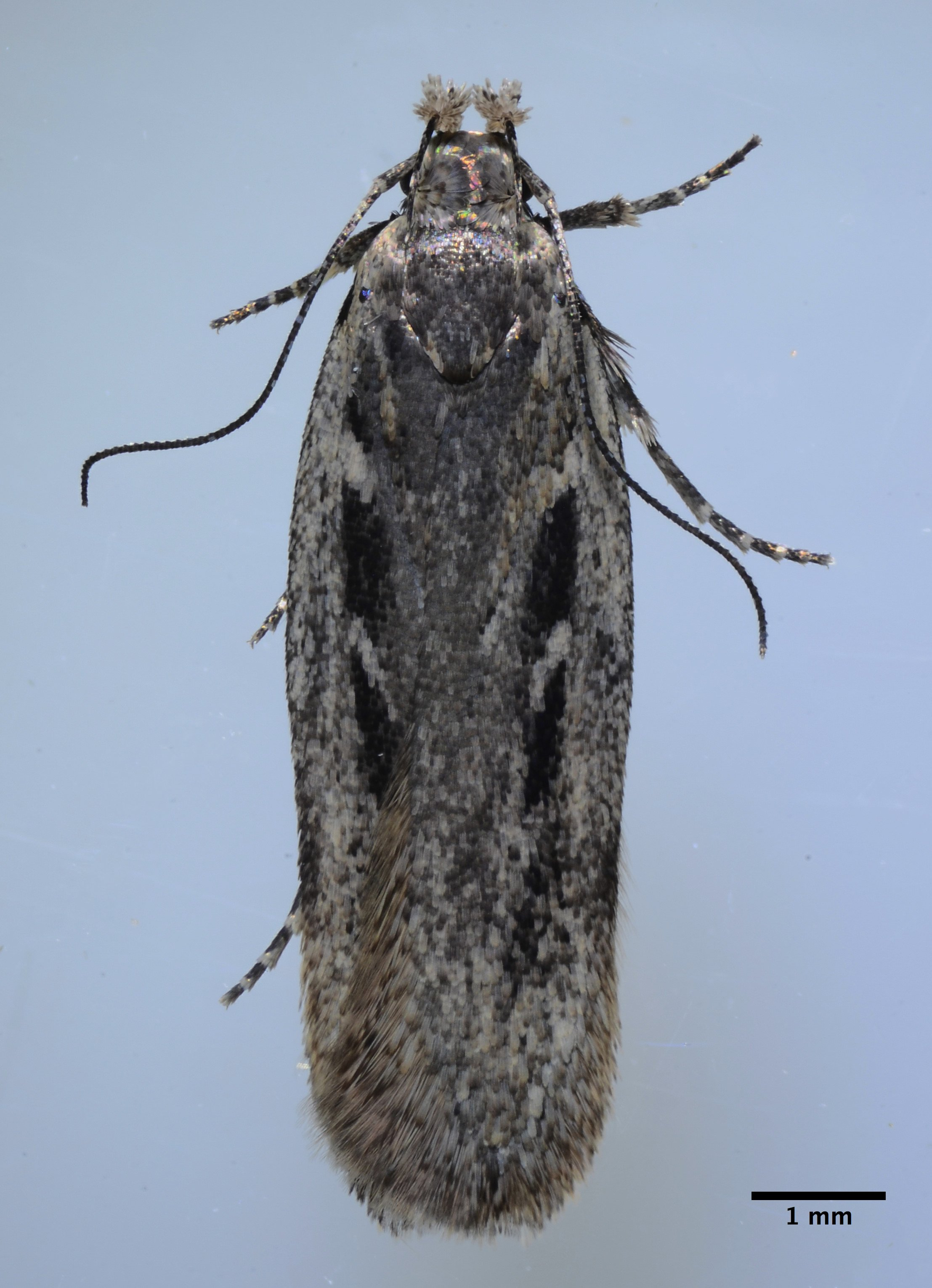

Scientific classification
- Kingdom: Animalia
- Phylum: Arthropoda
- Clade: Pancrustacea
- Class: Insecta
- Order: Lepidoptera
- Family: Gelechiidae
- Genus: Filatima
- Species: F. obidenna

Binomial name
- Filatima obidenna Clarke, 1947

= Filatima obidenna =

Species of moth

Filatima obidenna is a moth of the family Gelechiidae. It is found in North America, where it has been recorded from Arizona.

The wingspan is 17–20 mm.
