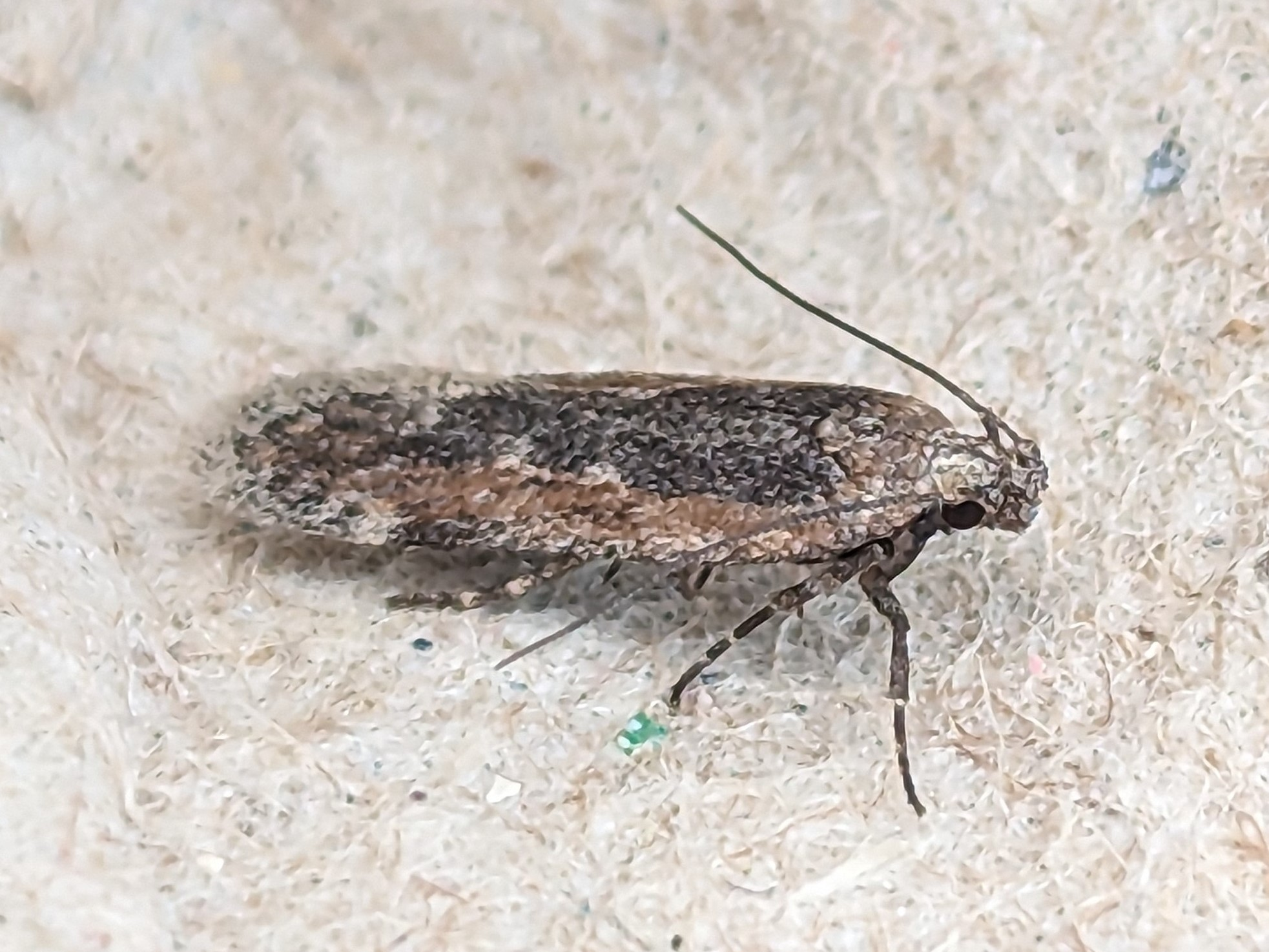

Scientific classification
- Kingdom: Animalia
- Phylum: Arthropoda
- Clade: Pancrustacea
- Class: Insecta
- Order: Lepidoptera
- Family: Gelechiidae
- Genus: Filatima
- Species: F. epulatrix

Binomial name
- Filatima epulatrix Hodges, 1969

= Filatima epulatrix =

Species of moth

Filatima epulatrix is a species of moth in the family Gelechiidae. It is found in North America, where it has been recorded from British Columbia, New York, Oklahoma, Ontario and Quebec.

The wingspan is 15.5-17.5 mm.

The larvae feed on Malus sylvestris.
