= Filatima monotaeniella =

Scientific classification
- Domain: Eukaryota
- Kingdom: Animalia
- Phylum: Arthropoda
- Class: Insecta
- Order: Lepidoptera
- Family: Gelechiidae
- Genus: Filatima
- Species: F. monotaeniella

Binomial name
- Filatima monotaeniella (Bottimer, 1926)

Synonyms
- Gelechia monotaeniella Bottimer, 1926

Species of moth

Filatima monotaeniella is a moth of the family Gelechiidae. It is found in North America, where it has been recorded from Texas.

The larvae feed on Vachellia farnesiana.
