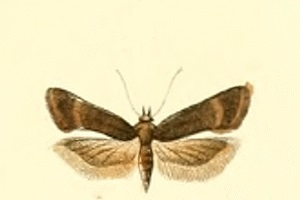

Scientific classification
- Kingdom: Animalia
- Phylum: Arthropoda
- Class: Insecta
- Order: Lepidoptera
- Family: Gelechiidae
- Genus: Filatima
- Species: F. spurcella

Binomial name
- Filatima spurcella (Duponchel, 1843)

Synonyms
- Anacampsis spurcella Duponchel, 1843; Gelechia fuscantella Heinemann, 1870

= Filatima spurcella =

Species of moth

Filatima spurcella is a moth of the family Gelechiidae. It is found from central and southern Europe to the southern Ural and Turkey.

The larvae feed on Crataegus and Amelanchier species, as well as Prunus spinosa.
