= Filatima confusatella =

Scientific classification
- Domain: Eukaryota
- Kingdom: Animalia
- Phylum: Arthropoda
- Class: Insecta
- Order: Lepidoptera
- Family: Gelechiidae
- Genus: Filatima
- Species: F. confusatella

Binomial name
- Filatima confusatella (Darlington, 1948)

Synonyms
- Gnorimoschema confusatella Darlington, 1948

Species of moth

Filatima confusatella is a moth of the family Gelechiidae. It is found in North America, where it has been recorded from New Jersey.
