= Filatima sperryi =

Scientific classification
- Domain: Eukaryota
- Kingdom: Animalia
- Phylum: Arthropoda
- Class: Insecta
- Order: Lepidoptera
- Family: Gelechiidae
- Genus: Filatima
- Species: F. sperryi

Binomial name
- Filatima sperryi Clarke, 1947

Species of moth

Filatima sperryi is a moth of the family Gelechiidae. It is found in North America, where it has been recorded from California, Nevada and Utah.

The wingspan is 18–21 mm.

== Etymology ==
The species is named for John L. Sperry, who provided the type specimen and the Nevada specimen.
