= Filatima ornatifimbriella =

Scientific classification
- Kingdom: Animalia
- Phylum: Arthropoda
- Clade: Pancrustacea
- Class: Insecta
- Order: Lepidoptera
- Family: Gelechiidae
- Genus: Filatima
- Species: F. ornatifimbriella

Binomial name
- Filatima ornatifimbriella (Clemens, 1864)

Synonyms
- Gelechia ornatifimbriella Clemens, 1864; Gelechia unctulella Zeller, 1873; Gelechia amorphaeella Chambers, 1877

Species of moth

Filatima ornatifimbriella is a moth of the family Gelechiidae. It is found in North America, where it has been recorded from Colorado, Arizona, Texas, Nebraska and Illinois.

The length of the forewings is 6.5-8.5 mm.
