= Filatima frugalis =

Scientific classification
- Domain: Eukaryota
- Kingdom: Animalia
- Phylum: Arthropoda
- Class: Insecta
- Order: Lepidoptera
- Family: Gelechiidae
- Genus: Filatima
- Species: F. frugalis

Binomial name
- Filatima frugalis (Braun, 1925)

Synonyms
- Gelechia frugalis Braun, 1925

Species of moth

Filatima frugalis is a moth of the family Gelechiidae. It is found in North America, where it has been recorded from Utah and Texas.

The larvae feed on Amelanchier alnifolia.
