= Filatima aulaea =

Scientific classification
- Domain: Eukaryota
- Kingdom: Animalia
- Phylum: Arthropoda
- Class: Insecta
- Order: Lepidoptera
- Family: Gelechiidae
- Genus: Filatima
- Species: F. aulaea

Binomial name
- Filatima aulaea (Clarke, 1932)

Synonyms
- Gelechia aulaea Clarke, 1932

Species of moth

Filatima aulaea is a moth of the family Gelechiidae. It is found in North America, where it has been recorded from Washington, Idaho, Wyoming and California.
