= Filatima shastaella =

Scientific classification
- Kingdom: Animalia
- Phylum: Arthropoda
- Clade: Pancrustacea
- Class: Insecta
- Order: Lepidoptera
- Family: Gelechiidae
- Genus: Filatima
- Species: F. shastaella

Binomial name
- Filatima shastaella (Gaede, 1937)

Synonyms
- Gelechia shastaella Gaede, 1937; Gelechia albifemorella Clarke, 1932 (preocc. Hofmann, 1867); Filatima clarkella Busck, 1939

Species of moth

Filatima shastaella is a moth of the family Gelechiidae. It is found in North America, where it has been recorded from California.
