= Filatima glycyrhizaeella =

Scientific classification
- Kingdom: Animalia
- Phylum: Arthropoda
- Clade: Pancrustacea
- Class: Insecta
- Order: Lepidoptera
- Family: Gelechiidae
- Genus: Filatima
- Species: F. glycyrhizaeella

Binomial name
- Filatima glycyrhizaeella (Chambers, 1877)

Synonyms
- Gelechia glycyrhizaeella Chambers, 1877; Gelechia lepidotae Clarke, 1934

Species of moth

Filatima glycyrhizaeella is a moth of the family Gelechiidae. It is found in North America, where it has been recorded from Washington, Arizona and Colorado.

The forewings are yellowish-ochreous, dusted densely with brown and somewhat with white along both margins, the dusted portion on the dorsal margin wider than that on the costal margin. The hindwings are pale leaden.

The larvae feed on Glycyrrhiza lepidotae.
