= Filatima nucifer =

Scientific classification
- Domain: Eukaryota
- Kingdom: Animalia
- Phylum: Arthropoda
- Class: Insecta
- Order: Lepidoptera
- Family: Gelechiidae
- Genus: Filatima
- Species: F. nucifer

Binomial name
- Filatima nucifer (Walsingham, 1911)

Synonyms
- Gelechia nucifer Walsingham, 1911

Species of moth

Filatima nucifer is a moth of the family Gelechiidae. It is found in Mexico (Sonora) and the United States, where it has been recorded from Montana.

The wingspan is 15–16 mm. The forewings are whitish cinereous, profusely sprinkled with fuscous, forming a small reduplicated spot on the base of the costa, and a few ill-defined groups, at the base of the cilia, around the apex and termen, otherwise evenly and profusely distributed over the wing-surface. There are three small rust-brown spots, two discal and one plical, the first discal scarcely before the middle, the second at the end of the cell. The plical spot is straight below the first discal. The hindwings are greyish at the base, becoming brownish grey outwardly.

The larvae feed on the leaves of Prosopis species.
