= Filatima arizonella =

Scientific classification
- Domain: Eukaryota
- Kingdom: Animalia
- Phylum: Arthropoda
- Class: Insecta
- Order: Lepidoptera
- Family: Gelechiidae
- Genus: Filatima
- Species: F. arizonella

Binomial name
- Filatima arizonella (Busck, 1903)

Synonyms
- Gelechia arizonella Busck, 1903

Species of moth

Filatima arizonella is a moth of the family Gelechiidae. It is found in North America, where it has been recorded from Arizona.

The wingspan is 13–15 mm. The forewings are deep bronzy black with four white markings, namely, one large outwardly oblique white costal streak near the base, the lower tip of which crosses the fold. There is one nearly elliptical white spot on the middle of the wing, one triangular white costal spot at the beginning of the cilia, and opposite this a smaller dorsal white spot. The hindwings are light silvery fuscous, darker along the costa and toward the tip.
