= Filatima perpensa =

Scientific classification
- Domain: Eukaryota
- Kingdom: Animalia
- Phylum: Arthropoda
- Class: Insecta
- Order: Lepidoptera
- Family: Gelechiidae
- Genus: Filatima
- Species: F. perpensa

Binomial name
- Filatima perpensa Clarke, 1947

Species of moth

Filatima perpensa is a moth of the family Gelechiidae. It is found in North America, where it has been recorded from California.

The wingspan is 18–22 mm.
