= Filatima ochreosuffusella =

Scientific classification
- Kingdom: Animalia
- Phylum: Arthropoda
- Clade: Pancrustacea
- Class: Insecta
- Order: Lepidoptera
- Family: Gelechiidae
- Genus: Filatima
- Species: F. ochreosuffusella

Binomial name
- Filatima ochreosuffusella (Chambers, 1874)

Synonyms
- Gelechia ochreosuffusella Chambers, 1874; Gelechia depresso-strigella Chambers, 1874; Gelechia asbolodes Meyrick, 1927

Species of moth

Filatima ochreosuffusella is a moth of the family Gelechiidae. It is found in North America, where it has been recorded from Texas.

The wingspan is about 17 mm. The forewings are rather dark grey, the veins lined black except towards the margins, the ground colour mixed whitish in the disc between the veins and there is a small blackish-grey spot on the base of the costa, some dull reddish-brown suffusion beneath the costa beyond this. Opposite suffused white spots are found on the costa at three-fourths and the tornus, connected by a slender straight interrupted line of white suffusion, with blotches of blackish-grey suffusion preceding these on the costa and dorsum. The hindwings are grey, thinly scaled anteriorly.
