= Filatima collinearis =

Scientific classification
- Kingdom: Animalia
- Phylum: Arthropoda
- Class: Insecta
- Order: Lepidoptera
- Family: Gelechiidae
- Genus: Filatima
- Species: F. collinearis

Binomial name
- Filatima collinearis (Meyrick, 1927)

Synonyms
- Gelechia collinearis Meyrick, 1927

Species of moth

Filatima collinearis is a moth of the family Gelechiidae. It is found in North America, where it has been recorded from Texas.

The wingspan is 19–20 mm. The forewings are light grey speckled dark fuscous, sometimes partially tinged whitish. There are several small indistinct dots of black irroration on the basal area and the second discal stigma is small, blackish, sometimes followed by a few whitish-ochreous scales, and tending to be connected by an imperfect row of blackish scales with a minute blackish dot representing the first discal. The hindwings are grey.
