= Filatima gomphopis =

Scientific classification
- Kingdom: Animalia
- Phylum: Arthropoda
- Class: Insecta
- Order: Lepidoptera
- Family: Gelechiidae
- Genus: Filatima
- Species: F. gomphopis

Binomial name
- Filatima gomphopis (Meyrick, 1927)

Synonyms
- Gelechia gomphopis Meyrick, 1927

Species of moth

Filatima gomphopis is a moth of the family Gelechiidae. It is found in North America, where it has been recorded from Texas.

The wingspan is 16–17 mm. The forewings are whitish-grey, sometimes minutely speckled darker or with a few scattered blackish scales. The base of the costal edge is black and there is a small spot of greyish suffusion in the disc before the first stigmata. The plical and first discal stigmata are small or minute, black, accompanied by small pale yellow-ochreous dots, the plical somewhat anterior, the second discal forming a short thick black dash, all these surrounded with whiter suffusion. There is a small blackish spot on the costa before two-thirds, from beyond this a faint whiter angulated transverse shade more or less perceptible. The hindwings are light bluish-grey.
