= Filatima revisensis =

Scientific classification
- Domain: Eukaryota
- Kingdom: Animalia
- Phylum: Arthropoda
- Class: Insecta
- Order: Lepidoptera
- Family: Gelechiidae
- Genus: Filatima
- Species: F. revisensis

Binomial name
- Filatima revisensis Harrison & Berenbaum, 2013

Species of moth

Filatima revisensis is a moth of the family Gelechiidae. It is found in the United States, where it has been recorded from Illinois, Iowa and Minnesota.

The larvae feed on Amorpha canescens. The species overwinters in the larval stage.

== Etymology ==
The species is named for the Revis Hill Prairie in Mason County, Illinois, the type locality.
