= Filatima vaniae =

Scientific classification
- Kingdom: Animalia
- Phylum: Arthropoda
- Class: Insecta
- Order: Lepidoptera
- Family: Gelechiidae
- Genus: Filatima
- Species: F. vaniae

Binomial name
- Filatima vaniae Clarke, 1947

Species of moth from North America

Filatima vaniae is a moth of the family Gelechiidae. It is found in North America, where it has been recorded from Utah and California.

The wingspan is 15–18 mm.

The larvae feed on Ribes species.
