= Filatima neotrophella =

Scientific classification
- Domain: Eukaryota
- Kingdom: Animalia
- Phylum: Arthropoda
- Class: Insecta
- Order: Lepidoptera
- Family: Gelechiidae
- Genus: Filatima
- Species: F. neotrophella

Binomial name
- Filatima neotrophella (Heinrich, 1921)

Synonyms
- Gelechia neotrophella Heinrich, 1921

Species of moth

Filatima neotrophella is a moth of the family Gelechiidae. It is found in North America, where it has been recorded from Texas.

The wingspan is 12–13 mm. The forewings are black, marked with overlaid white scales, forming an oblique, basal greyish-white patch which is widest on the dorsum. There is also an obscure, rather broad median fascia consisting of a narrow, oblique median streak clouded with greyish before and behind. The hindwings are pale smoky fuscous, somewhat shaded with black towards the apex.

The larvae feed on Mimosa berlandieri. They tie the leaves of their host plant and spin a silken tube.
