= Filatima kerzhneri =

Scientific classification
- Kingdom: Animalia
- Phylum: Arthropoda
- Clade: Pancrustacea
- Class: Insecta
- Order: Lepidoptera
- Family: Gelechiidae
- Genus: Filatima
- Species: F. kerzhneri

Binomial name
- Filatima kerzhneri Ivinskis & Piskunov, 1989

Species of moth

Filatima kerzhneri is a moth of the family Gelechiidae. It is found in Central Asia.
