= Filatima isocrossa =

Scientific classification
- Kingdom: Animalia
- Phylum: Arthropoda
- Class: Insecta
- Order: Lepidoptera
- Family: Gelechiidae
- Genus: Filatima
- Species: F. isocrossa

Binomial name
- Filatima isocrossa (Meyrick, 1927)

Synonyms
- Gelechia isocrossa Meyrick, 1927; Filatima virgea Clarke, 1947

Species of moth

Filatima isocrossa is a moth of the family Gelechiidae. It is found in North America, where it has been recorded from Texas.

The wingspan is 15–18 mm.

The larvae feed on Acacia vernicosa.
