= Filatima djakovica =

Scientific classification
- Kingdom: Animalia
- Phylum: Arthropoda
- Clade: Pancrustacea
- Class: Insecta
- Order: Lepidoptera
- Family: Gelechiidae
- Genus: Filatima
- Species: F. djakovica

Binomial name
- Filatima djakovica Anikin & Piskunov, 1996

Species of moth

Filatima djakovica is a moth of the family Gelechiidae. It is found in southern and central Russia, Ukraine and Romania.

The wingspan is about 17 mm.
