= Filatima textorella =

Scientific classification
- Kingdom: Animalia
- Phylum: Arthropoda
- Class: Insecta
- Order: Lepidoptera
- Family: Gelechiidae
- Genus: Filatima
- Species: F. textorella

Binomial name
- Filatima textorella (Chrétien, 1908)

Synonyms
- Gelechia textorella Chrétien, 1908

Species of moth

Filatima textorella is a moth of the family Gelechiidae. It is found in southern France and Spain.

The wingspan is 15–19 mm.

The larvae feed on Dorycnium pentaphyllum.
