= Filatima fontisella =

Scientific classification
- Kingdom: Animalia
- Phylum: Arthropoda
- Clade: Pancrustacea
- Class: Insecta
- Order: Lepidoptera
- Family: Gelechiidae
- Genus: Filatima
- Species: F. fontisella

Binomial name
- Filatima fontisella Lvovsky & Piskunov, 1989

Species of moth

Filatima fontisella is a moth of the family Gelechiidae. It is found in Russia.
