= Filatima xanthuris =

Scientific classification
- Kingdom: Animalia
- Phylum: Arthropoda
- Class: Insecta
- Order: Lepidoptera
- Family: Gelechiidae
- Genus: Filatima
- Species: F. xanthuris

Binomial name
- Filatima xanthuris (Meyrick, 1927)

Synonyms
- Gelechia xanthuris Meyrick, 1927

Species of moth

Filatima xanthuris is a moth of the family Gelechiidae. It is found in North America, where it has been recorded from North Carolina, South Carolina, Texas, New Mexico, Arizona, Utah, Nevada, Manitoba, Alberta, British Columbia, Washington and Oregon.

The wingspan is 20–24 mm. The forewings are fuscous, obscurely irrorated darker, sometimes with a short dark fuscous streak on the fold towards the base in females. The stigmata are cloudy, dark fuscous, the plical obliquely before the first discal, the second discal rather large, subtriangular or elongate, but all these in males obscure and sometimes hardly perceptible, in females more distinct. The apical area is often sprinkled whitish, with a small indistinct whitish spot on the costa at four-fifths and a faint angulated line sometimes perceptible. The hindwings are light bluish-grey.

The larvae feed on Thermopsis pinetorum, Lupinus, Robinia and Vicia species.
