= Filatima striatella =

Scientific classification
- Domain: Eukaryota
- Kingdom: Animalia
- Phylum: Arthropoda
- Class: Insecta
- Order: Lepidoptera
- Family: Gelechiidae
- Genus: Filatima
- Species: F. striatella

Binomial name
- Filatima striatella (Busck, 1903)

Synonyms
- Gelechia striatella Busck, 1903; Gelechia rivulata Meyrick, 1927

Species of moth

Filatima striatella is a moth of the family Gelechiidae. It is found in North America, where it has been recorded from Alberta, Texas and Arizona.

The wingspan is 16-17.5 mm. The forewings are light whitish grey, thickly sprinkled with darker grey-brown, and black scales, which are arranged in indistinct narrow longitudinal darker lines, somewhat more pronounced in the apical part of the wing, but even there not clearly perceptible. Along the fold and at the dorsal cilia the wing is faintly suffused with ochreous. The hindwings are shining light ochreous fuscous.
