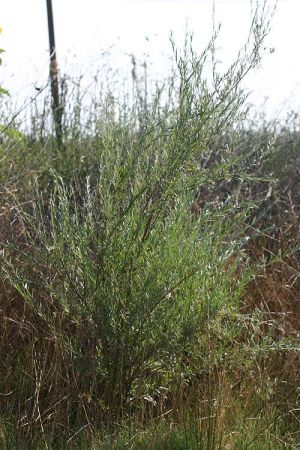

Conservation status
- Least Concern (IUCN 3.1)

Scientific classification
- Kingdom: Plantae
- Clade: Tracheophytes
- Clade: Angiosperms
- Clade: Eudicots
- Clade: Rosids
- Order: Malpighiales
- Family: Salicaceae
- Genus: Salix
- Species: S. sessilifolia

Binomial name
- Salix sessilifolia Nutt.
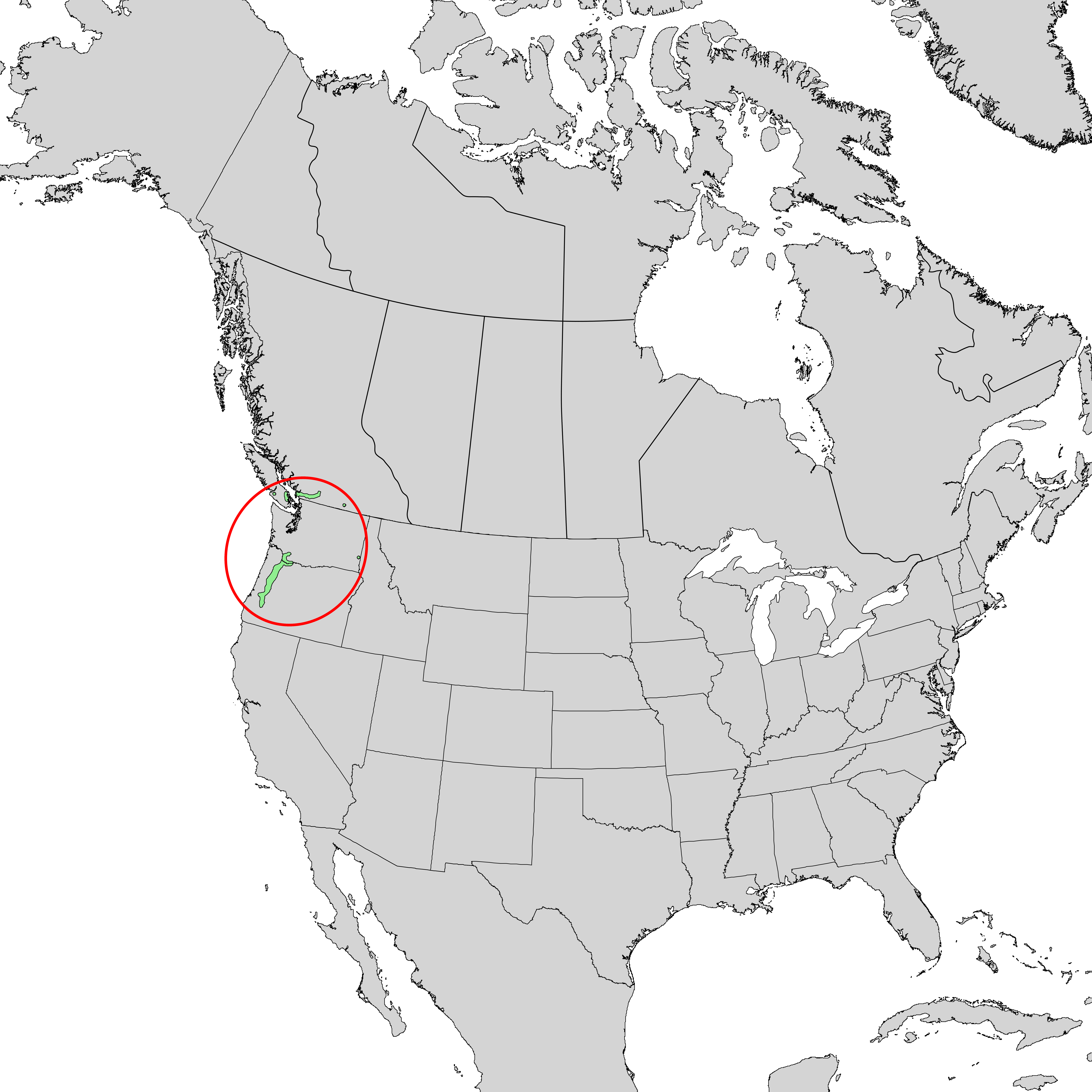
- Natural range of Salix sessilifolia

Synonyms
- Salix fluviatilis auct. non Nutt.; Salix macrostachya Nutt.; Salix exigua var. sessilifolia; Salix fluviatilis var. sessilifolia; Salix longifolia var. sessilifolia

= Salix sessilifolia =

Species of willow

Salix sessilifolia is a species of willow known by the common name northwest sandbar willow. It is native to the west coast of North America from British Columbia and the US states of Washington and Oregon. It grows on sandy and gravelly riverbanks, floodplains, and sandbars.

Salix sessilifolia Nutt. is a shrub growing 3 to 5 metres (10 to 16 1/2 ft), exceptionally 7.5 m (24 1/2 ft) in height, sometimes forming colonial thickets of clones by sprouting repeatedly from its root system. The leaves are up to 12 centimetres (4 1/2 in) long, oval with pointed tips, edged with spiny teeth, and generally coated thinly in silky hairs. The inflorescence is a catkin of flowers, male catkins up to 4.5 cm (2 in) long and female catkins longer and more slender.
