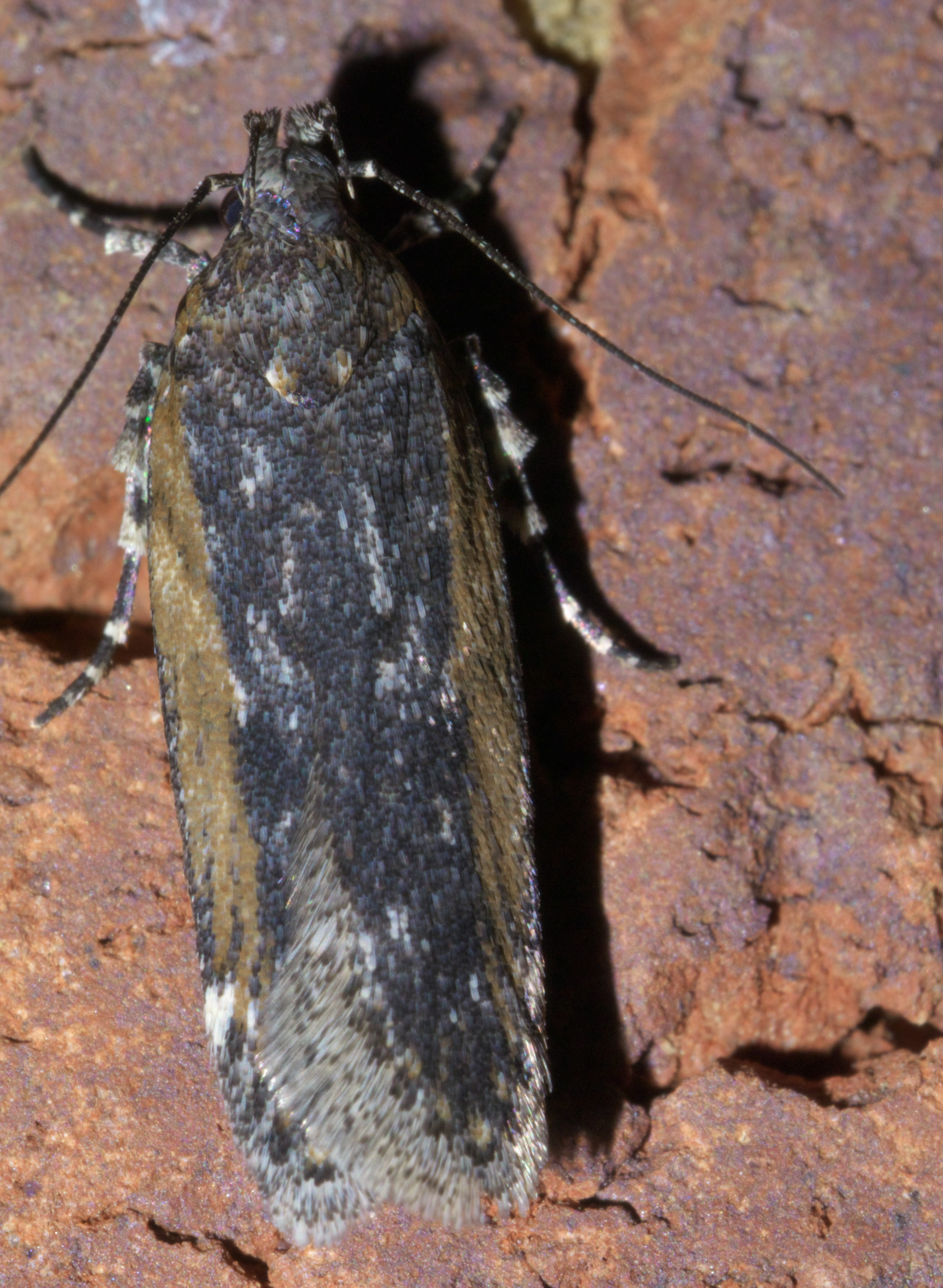

Scientific classification
- Kingdom: Animalia
- Phylum: Arthropoda
- Clade: Pancrustacea
- Class: Insecta
- Order: Lepidoptera
- Family: Gelechiidae
- Genus: Filatima
- Species: F. pseudacaciella

Binomial name
- Filatima pseudacaciella (Chambers, 1872)

Synonyms
- Depressaria pseudacaciella Chambers, 1872; Gelechia caecella Zeller, 1873

= Filatima pseudacaciella =

Species of moth

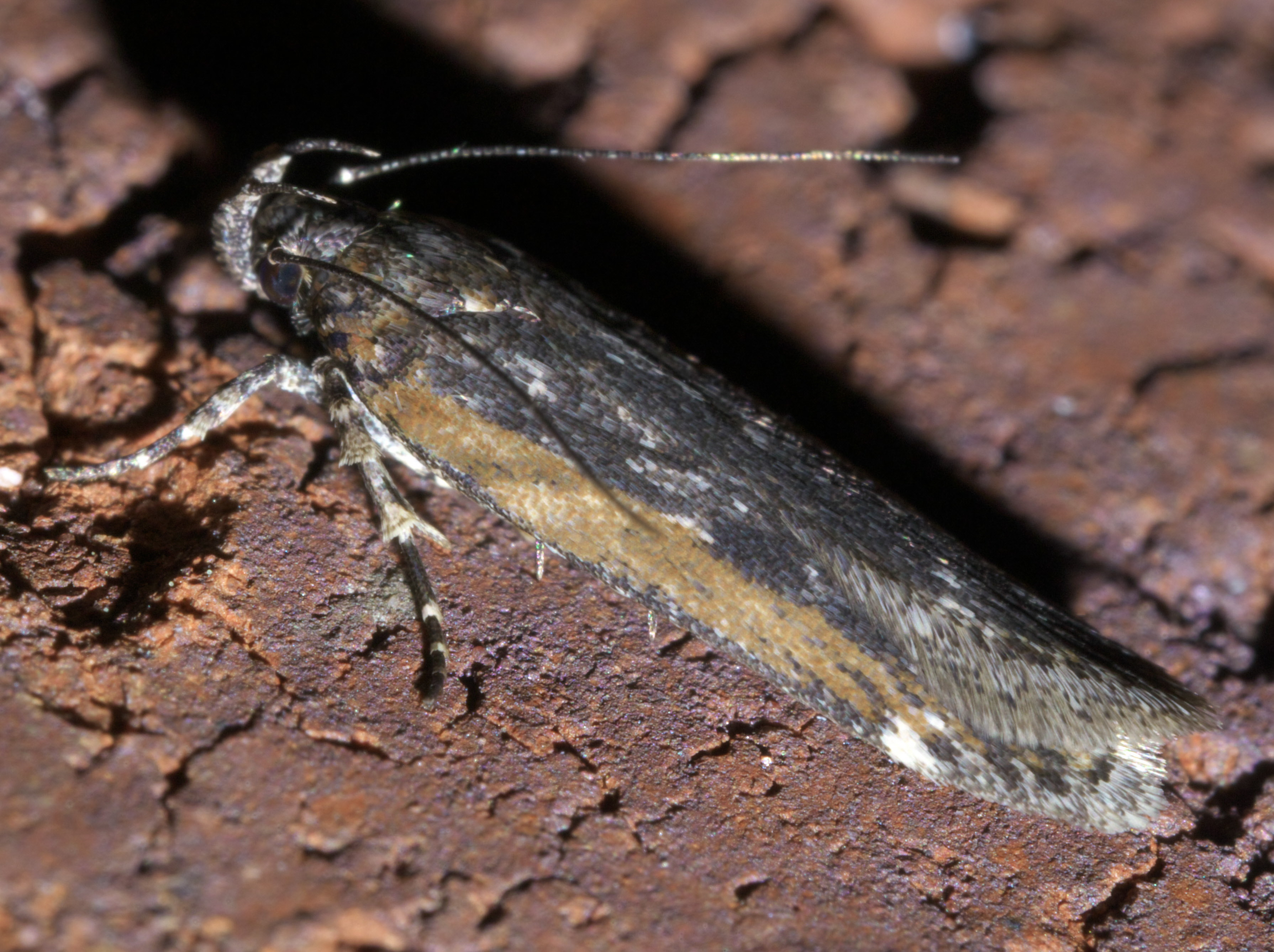
Filatima pseudacaciella, dusky-backed filatima, Size: 11.6 mm

Filatima pseudacaciella, the dusky-backed filatima moth, is a moth of the family Gelechiidae. It is found in North America, where it has been recorded from California, Illinois, Indiana, Kansas, Kentucky, Louisiana, Maine, Massachusetts, Mississippi, New Hampshire, New York, Ohio, Oklahoma, Ontario, Tennessee and West Virginia.

The forewings are dark purplish-brown, streaked and flecked with white and ocherous especially. A streak extends from the base nearly to the apex, just within the costal margin of which the prevailing hue is ocherous, mixed with white. A white costal spot at the beginning of the costal cilia, and an opposite dorsal one, both small. The hindwings are pale ocherous-brown.

The larvae feed on the leaves of Robinia pseudacacia. They have been observed feeding within the mines of Macrosaccus robiniella, but also feed externally. Young larvae are green with darker green longitudinal markings and a shining black head. Older larvae are pale brown with two dark brown longitudinal stripes and a row of dark brown spots.
