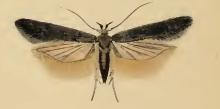
- Xenolechia aethiops

Scientific classification
- Domain: Eukaryota
- Kingdom: Animalia
- Phylum: Arthropoda
- Class: Insecta
- Order: Lepidoptera
- Family: Gelechiidae
- Tribe: Litini
- Genus: Xenolechia; Meyrick, 1895

= Xenolechia =

Genus of moths

Xenolechia is a genus of moth in the family Gelechiidae. The genus is distributed in Eurasia and North America. Host plants are known from families Ericaceae, Fagaceae, and Rhamnaceae.

== Species ==
There are eleven recognized species:

- Xenolechia aethiops (Humphreys & Westwood, 1845)
- Xenolechia basistrigella (Zeller, 1873)
- Xenolechia ceanothiae Priest, 2014
- Xenolechia ceanothiella (Braun, 1921)
- Xenolechia lindae Huemer & Karsholt, 1999
- Xenolechia ontariensis Keifer, 1933
- Xenolechia pseudovulgella Huemer & Karsholt, 1999
- Xenolechia querciphaga Keifer, 1933
- Xenolechia staspa Opler, 1974
- Xenolechia taphiopis (Meyrick, 1929)
- Xenolechia velatella Busck, 1907

X. taphiopis may also be included in Recurvaria as Recurvaria taphiopis.
