= Xenolechia ontariensis =

Scientific classification
- Kingdom: Animalia
- Phylum: Arthropoda
- Class: Insecta
- Order: Lepidoptera
- Family: Gelechiidae
- Genus: Xenolechia
- Species: X. ontariensis

Binomial name
- Xenolechia ontariensis Keifer, 1933

Species of moth

Xenolechia ontariensis is a moth of the family Gelechiidae. It is found in North America, where it has been recorded from Manitoba to Texas, as well as Arizona and possibly California.

The wingspan is about 12 mm. Adults are similar to Xenolechia querciphaga. Adults are on wing from April to July.
