= List of gelechiid genera: X =

The large moth family Gelechiidae contains the following genera:

- Xenolechia
- Xystophora
