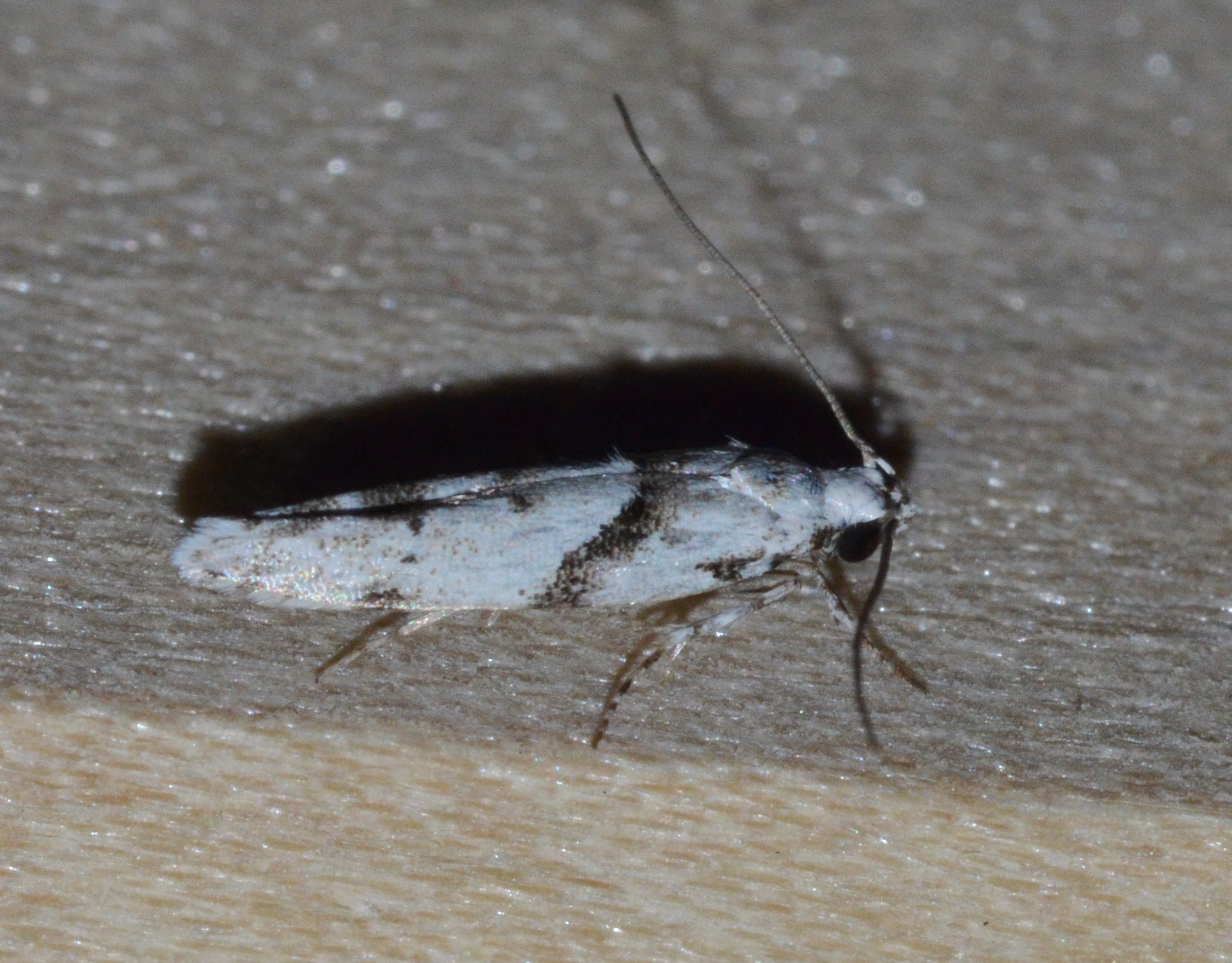
- Arogalea cristifasciella

Scientific classification
- Domain: Eukaryota
- Kingdom: Animalia
- Phylum: Arthropoda
- Class: Insecta
- Order: Lepidoptera
- Family: Gelechiidae
- Subfamily: Gelechiinae
- Tribe: Litini
- Genus: Arogalea; Walsingham, 1910

= Arogalea =

Genus of moths

Arogalea is a genus of moths in the family Gelechiidae.

== Species ==
- Arogalea albilingua Walsingham, 1911
- Arogalea archaea Walsingham, 1911
- Arogalea cristifasciella (Chambers, 1878)
- Arogalea crocipunctella (Walsingham, [1892])
- Arogalea melitoptila (Meyrick, 1923)
- Arogalea senecta Walsingham, 1911
- Arogalea soronella Busck, 1914

== Former species ==
- Arogalea senariella (Zeller, 1877)
