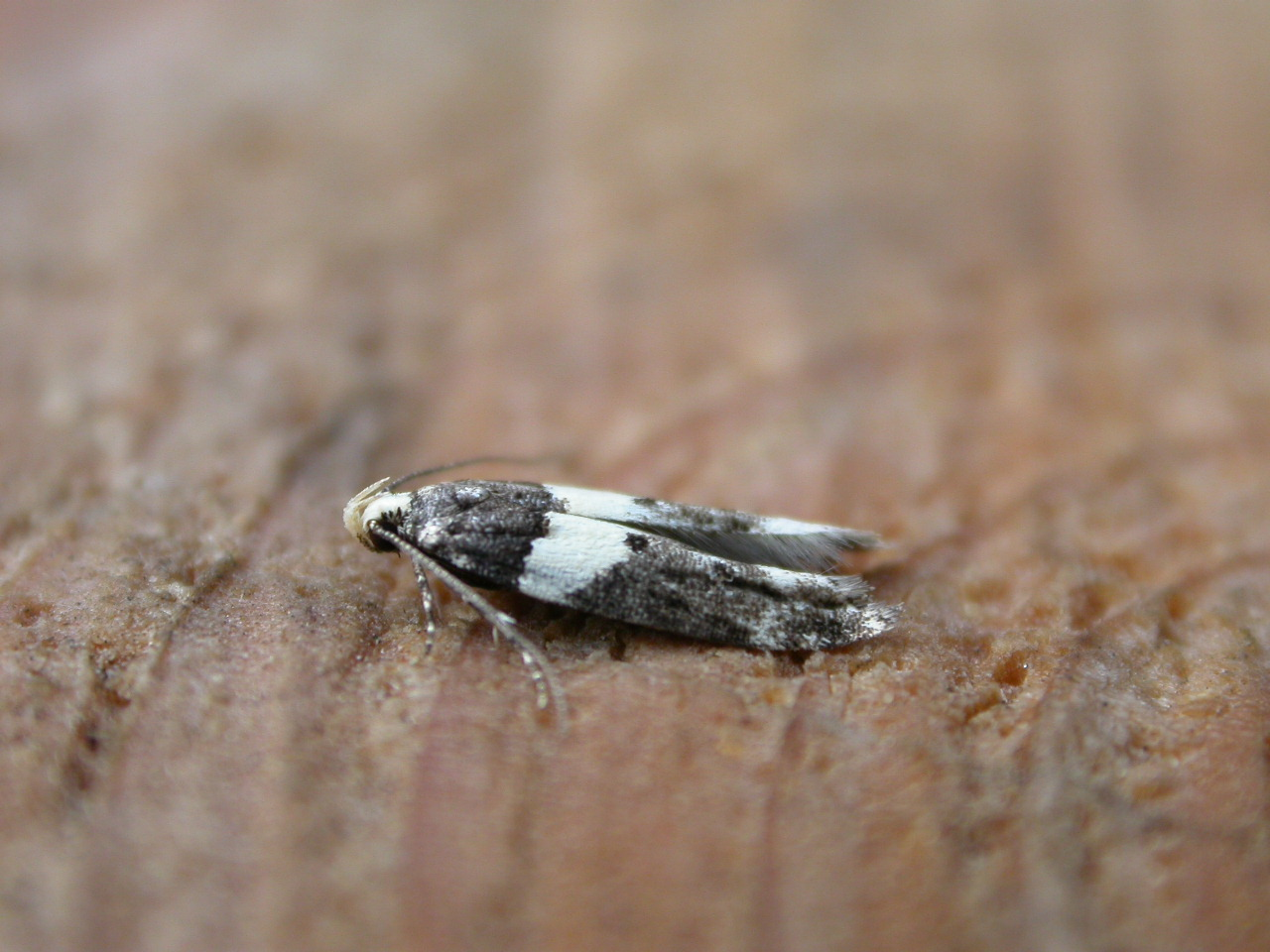

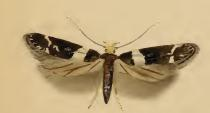

Scientific classification
- Domain: Eukaryota
- Kingdom: Animalia
- Phylum: Arthropoda
- Class: Insecta
- Order: Lepidoptera
- Family: Gelechiidae
- Genus: Recurvaria
- Species: R. leucatella

Binomial name
- Recurvaria leucatella (Clerck, 1759)

Synonyms
- Phalaena leucatella Clerck, 1759; Phalaena (Tinea) leucatella Linnaeus, 1761; Erminea leucatea Haworth, 1828; Lita albo-cingulella Duponchel, 1839

= Recurvaria leucatella =

Species of moth

Recurvaria leucatella (lesser budmoth or white-barred groundling moth) is a moth of the family Gelechiidae. It is found in most of Europe, Turkey, Central Asia and the Caucasus.

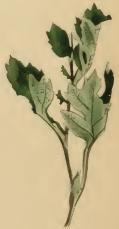
A sprig of hawthorn eaten by larva

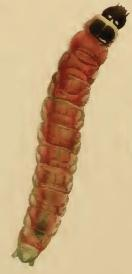
Larva

The wingspan is 14–15 mm. The head is ochreous-white. Forewings are dark fuscous; a broad white or ochreous-white fascia at 1/3; stigmata and a dot below second discal indistinctly blackish, somewhat raised; a white spot on tornus, and another on costa opposite; some white terminal scales. Hindwings are grey. The larva is light brown to whitish-green, more or less rosy-tinged; head and plate of 2 black.

The moths are on wing from June to July depending on the location.

The larvae feed on Crataegus and Malus species.
