= Recurvaria pleurosaris =

Scientific classification
- Kingdom: Animalia
- Phylum: Arthropoda
- Class: Insecta
- Order: Lepidoptera
- Family: Gelechiidae
- Genus: Recurvaria
- Species: R. pleurosaris

Binomial name
- Recurvaria pleurosaris Meyrick, 1923

Synonyms
- Coleotechnites pleurosaris

Species of moth

Recurvaria pleurosaris is a moth of the family Gelechiidae. It is found in Brazil (Amazonas).

The wingspan is about 7 mm. The forewings are ochreous-whitish irregular sprinkled ochreous and with elongate black marks on the costa at and near the base, before the middle and at two-thirds. There is a minute black dot beneath the costa at one-third, one above the fold at one-fourth, a small tuft beneath the fold beyond this. The discal stigmata are black whitish-ringed, with a small subdorsal spot of black irroration beneath the second. There are two small black dots on the costa near the apex, some slight grey and blackish sprinkling in the disc towards the apex, and two or three black specks on the termen. The hindwings are light grey.
