= Recurvaria rhicnota =

Scientific classification
- Domain: Eukaryota
- Kingdom: Animalia
- Phylum: Arthropoda
- Class: Insecta
- Order: Lepidoptera
- Family: Gelechiidae
- Genus: Recurvaria
- Species: R. rhicnota

Binomial name
- Recurvaria rhicnota Walsingham, 1910

Species of moth

Recurvaria rhicnota is a moth of the family Gelechiidae. It is found in Guatemala.

The wingspan is about 15 mm. The forewings are olivaceous brownish, with a slight ochreous tinge, profusely speckled with pale cinereous, especially on their basal half, with numerous dark brown spots and blotches, of which the more conspicuous are two costal on either side of the middle, one discal a little beyond the middle, one dorsal before the tornus, and three or four smaller marginal, around the apex. The hindwings are bronzy brownish grey.
