= Recurvaria thiodes =

Scientific classification
- Kingdom: Animalia
- Phylum: Arthropoda
- Class: Insecta
- Order: Lepidoptera
- Family: Gelechiidae
- Genus: Recurvaria
- Species: R. thiodes

Binomial name
- Recurvaria thiodes Meyrick, 1917

Species of moth

Recurvaria thiodes is a moth of the family Gelechiidae. It is found in Colombia.

The wingspan is about 10 mm. The forewings are pale sulphur-yellow, slightly speckled with fulvous and with an elongate black spot along the basal sixth of the costa, as well as small black semi-oval spots on the costa at two-fifths and two-thirds. The plical and second discal stigmata are black and there are two or three small black dots on the costa towards the apex, as well as four narrow semi-oval dark grey marks along the termen, with a few black scales. The hindwings are light grey.
