= Arogalea senecta =

Scientific classification
- Kingdom: Animalia
- Phylum: Arthropoda
- Class: Insecta
- Order: Lepidoptera
- Family: Gelechiidae
- Genus: Arogalea
- Species: A. senecta

Binomial name
- Arogalea senecta Walsingham, 1911

Species of moth

Arogalea senecta is a moth of the family Gelechiidae. It is found in Mexico (Guerrero).

The wingspan is about 12 mm. The forewings are greyish white, with dark fuscous sprinkling throughout and black scale-patches, some of which are distinctly raised. There is a small raised black spot on the costa near the base, a larger black spot in and above the fold at about one-fourth, a distinctly raised black patch on and above the dorsum beneath it, accompanied by a few chestnut-brown scales, also raised. Beyond this series of spots, which are more or less connected, a black costal spot occurs before the middle, with a curved black streak a little below and beyond it at the upper edge of the cell. This is succeeded by an inwardly oblique blackish cloud coming from the costa beyond the middle and almost connected with an opposite black dorsal spot, the latter narrowly produced outward and diffused nearly to the tornus. The apical portion of the wing is thickly sprinkled with dark fuscous, a streak of the same running through the basal half of the cilia at the apex. The hindwings are pale, shining, bluish grey.
