= Recurvaria annulicornis =

Scientific classification
- Domain: Eukaryota
- Kingdom: Animalia
- Phylum: Arthropoda
- Class: Insecta
- Order: Lepidoptera
- Family: Gelechiidae
- Genus: Recurvaria
- Species: R. annulicornis

Binomial name
- Recurvaria annulicornis (Walsingham, 1897)

Synonyms
- Aristotelia annulicornis Walsingham, 1897; Taygete annulicornis

Species of moth

Recurvaria annulicornis is a moth of the family Gelechiidae. It is found in the West Indies, where it has been recorded from Saint Thomas, Bermuda and Puerto Rico.

The wingspan is about 8 mm. The forewings are pale straw-ochreous, with a slight ferruginous shade along the middle from one-third to two-thirds, and several smoky-black spots and dots, the first at the base of the costa, small and inconspicuous. There is a larger costal spot at one-third, with one, immediately above the dorsum, straight below it. There is a larger costal spot at two-thirds, with a very small one straight below it at the end of the cell, a few smaller ones lying around the apex and apical margin. The hindwings are pale grey.
