= Arogalea albilingua =

Scientific classification
- Domain: Eukaryota
- Kingdom: Animalia
- Phylum: Arthropoda
- Class: Insecta
- Order: Lepidoptera
- Family: Gelechiidae
- Genus: Arogalea
- Species: A. albilingua

Binomial name
- Arogalea albilingua Walsingham, 1911

Species of moth

Arogalea albilingua is a moth of the family Gelechiidae. It is found in Mexico (Guerrero).

The wingspan is 10–10.5 mm. The forewings are shining white, sprinkled with brownish ochreous and brownish fuscous scales and with five conspicuous black marginal spots, one of these at the base of the costa is reduplicated, the white ground showing between its extremities. A second costal spot, before the middle, is followed by a third beyond the middle, opposite to which and a little beyond it is a black dorsal spot of raised scales at the end of the fold. Beyond this is a speck of black scales on the termen a little above the tornus, while another conspicuous black spot, with raised white scales intermixed, lies across the middle of the fold, a smaller similar spot on the cell about the middle of the wing. The hindwings are pale steely grey.
