= Recurvaria putella =

Scientific classification
- Kingdom: Animalia
- Phylum: Arthropoda
- Clade: Pancrustacea
- Class: Insecta
- Order: Lepidoptera
- Family: Gelechiidae
- Genus: Recurvaria
- Species: R. putella

Binomial name
- Recurvaria putella Busck, 1914

Species of moth

Recurvaria putella is a moth of the family Gelechiidae. It is found in Panama.

The wingspan is about 7 mm. The forewings are white, strongly suffused with grey, brown, ochreous, and black scales and with a large blackish brown, dorsal blotch at the base of the wing which terminates in tufts of raised scales, the tips of which are white. There are three equidistant, blackish, costal spots, one near the base, one before the middle, and one at the apical third. A central, longitudinal, black streak is edged on both sides with ochreous and is interrupted at the apical fourth by a transverse streak of tufted whitish scales. The hindwings are dark grey. The antennae are white with sharp blackish brown.
