= Recurvaria vestigata =

Scientific classification
- Kingdom: Animalia
- Phylum: Arthropoda
- Class: Insecta
- Order: Lepidoptera
- Family: Gelechiidae
- Genus: Recurvaria
- Species: R. vestigata

Binomial name
- Recurvaria vestigata Meyrick, 1929

Species of moth

Recurvaria vestigata is a moth of the family Gelechiidae first described by Edward Meyrick in 1929. It is found in North America, where it has been recorded from Ontario.

The wingspan is about 13 mm. Adults are on wing from April to June.
