= Recurvaria consimilis =

Scientific classification
- Kingdom: Animalia
- Phylum: Arthropoda
- Clade: Pancrustacea
- Class: Insecta
- Order: Lepidoptera
- Family: Gelechiidae
- Genus: Recurvaria
- Species: R. consimilis

Binomial name
- Recurvaria consimilis Braun, 1930

Species of moth

Recurvaria consimilis is a moth of the family Gelechiidae. It is found in North America, where it has been recorded from Illinois, Kentucky, Ohio and West Virginia.

The wingspan is about 8.5–9.5 mm.

The larvae feed on Ceanothus americanus. They mine the leaves of their host plant.
