= Recurvaria comprobata =

Scientific classification
- Kingdom: Animalia
- Phylum: Arthropoda
- Class: Insecta
- Order: Lepidoptera
- Family: Gelechiidae
- Genus: Recurvaria
- Species: R. comprobata

Binomial name
- Recurvaria comprobata (Meyrick, 1935)

Synonyms
- Telphusa comprobata Meyrick, 1935

Species of moth

Recurvaria comprobata is a moth of the family Gelechiidae. It is found in Japan, the Russian Far East (Primorye), Korea and China (Gansu, Shaanxi, Jilin).

The larvae feed on Sorbus comixta.
