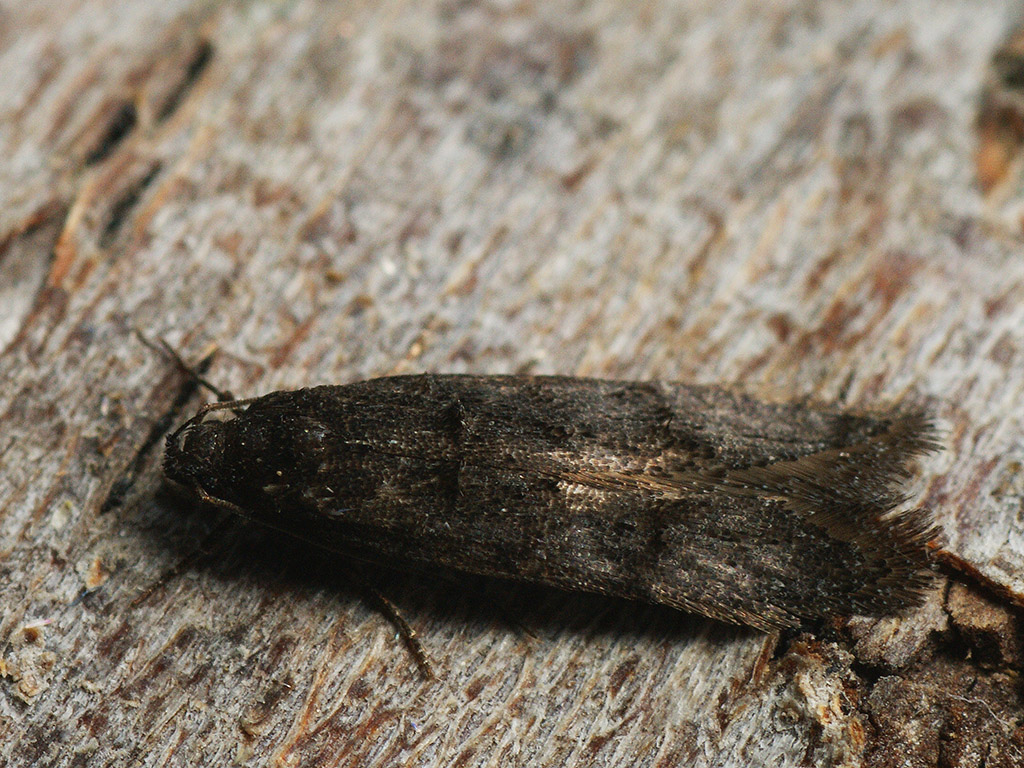

Scientific classification
- Kingdom: Animalia
- Phylum: Arthropoda
- Clade: Pancrustacea
- Class: Insecta
- Order: Lepidoptera
- Family: Gelechiidae
- Genus: Xenolechia
- Species: X. aethiops

Binomial name
- Xenolechia aethiops (Humphreys & Westwood, 1845)

Synonyms
- Anacampsis aethiops Humphreys & Westwood, 1845; Anacampsis aterrima Edleston, 1844; Gelechia aethiopella Doubleday, 1859; Gelechia squamulella Peyerimhoff, 1871; Gelechia quinquecristatella Chambers, 1878; Gelechia diffinis var. tristis Staudinger, 1879

= Xenolechia aethiops =

Species of moth

Xenolechia aethiops is a species of moth in the family Gelechiidae. It is found in Europe from Ireland, Great Britain and Denmark to the Iberian Peninsula, Sardinia, Italy and Greece. It is also present in North Africa and Turkey and has also been reported from North America, with records from Alberta, Arizona, California, Maine, Saskatchewan and Texas.

== Description ==
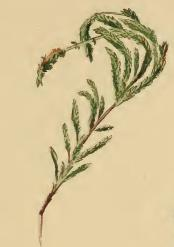
A sprig of heath eaten by larva

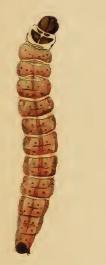
Larva

The wingspan is about 18 mm. The forewings are dark fuscous.stigmata black, raised, first discal much beyond plical; a similar spot in disc obliquely before plical, another on fold rather beyond first discal, and a third close beneath second discal. Hindwings considerably over 1, grey. The larva is dull reddish, segmental incisions greenish; dots black; head brown; plate of 2 black, crescentic, bisected

Adults are on wing in May and June.
