= Recurvaria francisca =

Scientific classification
- Domain: Eukaryota
- Kingdom: Animalia
- Phylum: Arthropoda
- Class: Insecta
- Order: Lepidoptera
- Family: Gelechiidae
- Genus: Recurvaria
- Species: R. francisca

Binomial name
- Recurvaria francisca Keifer, 1928

Species of moth

Recurvaria francisca is a moth of the family Gelechiidae. It is found in North America, where it has been recorded from California.

The larvae feed on Ceanothus thyrsiflorus.
