= Arogalea crocipunctella =

Scientific classification
- Kingdom: Animalia
- Phylum: Arthropoda
- Class: Insecta
- Order: Lepidoptera
- Family: Gelechiidae
- Genus: Arogalea
- Species: A. crocipunctella

Binomial name
- Arogalea crocipunctella (Walsingham, [1892])

Synonyms
- Lita crocipunctella Walsingham, [1892]

Species of moth

Arogalea crocipunctella is a moth of the family Gelechiidae. It is found in the West Indies, where it has been recorded from Saint Vincent.

The wingspan is about 12 mm. The forewings are dark umber, irrorated with pale ochreous scales and sprinkled with orange-yellow spots, some of which are faintly margined with raised blackish scales. The arrangement of the spots is somewhat as follows: one at the base below the costal margin, two on the fold, each followed by black scales, one on the middle of the wing and one beyond it towards the end of the cell, brighter and more conspicuous and followed by raised blackish scales. At one fourth from the apex, a large orange-yellow spot is found on the costal and an opposite one on the dorsal margin, with one small spot at the extreme apex. The hindwings are brownish grey.
