= Recurvaria filicornis =

Scientific classification
- Kingdom: Animalia
- Phylum: Arthropoda
- Clade: Pancrustacea
- Class: Insecta
- Order: Lepidoptera
- Family: Gelechiidae
- Genus: Recurvaria
- Species: R. filicornis

Binomial name
- Recurvaria filicornis (Zeller, 1877)

Synonyms
- Gelechia (Teleia) filicornis Zeller, 1877

Species of moth

Recurvaria filicornis is a moth of the family Gelechiidae. It is found in Colombia.
