= Recurvaria cinerella =

Scientific classification
- Domain: Eukaryota
- Kingdom: Animalia
- Phylum: Arthropoda
- Class: Insecta
- Order: Lepidoptera
- Family: Gelechiidae
- Genus: Recurvaria
- Species: R. cinerella

Binomial name
- Recurvaria cinerella Chrétien, 1908

Species of moth

Recurvaria cinerella is a moth of the family Gelechiidae. It is found on the Canary Islands.

The wingspan is about 6 mm.
