= Recurvaria stibomorpha =

Scientific classification
- Kingdom: Animalia
- Phylum: Arthropoda
- Class: Insecta
- Order: Lepidoptera
- Family: Gelechiidae
- Genus: Recurvaria
- Species: R. stibomorpha

Binomial name
- Recurvaria stibomorpha Meyrick, 1929

Species of moth

Recurvaria stibomorpha is a moth of the family Gelechiidae. It is found in North America, where it has been recorded from Ontario.

The wingspan is 9–10 mm.
