= Recurvaria sticta =

Scientific classification
- Domain: Eukaryota
- Kingdom: Animalia
- Phylum: Arthropoda
- Class: Insecta
- Order: Lepidoptera
- Family: Gelechiidae
- Genus: Recurvaria
- Species: R. sticta

Binomial name
- Recurvaria sticta Walsingham, 1910

Species of moth

Recurvaria sticta is a moth of the family Gelechiidae. It is found in Mexico (Guerrero).

The wingspan is 10–12 mm. The forewings are whitish ochreous, minutely dusted with pale brown and some blackish scales, with numerous black spots around which the brownish dusting is rather more profuse, at the extreme base of the costa is a small reduplicated black spot, with another at the middle of the base beneath it. A black costal spot is found before the middle, followed by a larger one, somewhat quadrangular, beyond the middle, after which three small black dots are found along the base of the costal cilia, followed in turn by an oblique black apical streak. A conspicuous outwardly oblique black dorsal patch arises immediately beyond the flexus, extending across the fold before its middle and there is a broken black streak along the outer half of the cell, a dorsal spot before the tornus, three or four small black spots along the termen, and one or two others just beyond the cell, enclosed by a faintly indicated whitish line, strongly bent outward, passing from the costal to the dorsal cilia. The terminal cilia is whitish ochreous, minutely dusted with black which forms a faint line running through them beyond their middle. The dorsal cilia is greyish ochreous. The hindwings are pale bluish grey along the middle and the costa is narrowly and the dorsum broadly tinged with brownish ochreous.
