= Recurvaria thomeriella =

Scientific classification
- Domain: Eukaryota
- Kingdom: Animalia
- Phylum: Arthropoda
- Class: Insecta
- Order: Lepidoptera
- Family: Gelechiidae
- Genus: Recurvaria
- Species: R. thomeriella

Binomial name
- Recurvaria thomeriella (Chrétien, 1901)

Synonyms
- Teleia thomeriella Chrétien, 1901; Teleiodes thomeriella

Species of moth

Recurvaria thomeriella is a moth of the family Gelechiidae. It is found in southern France and Spain.

The larvae feed on Prunus spinosa.
