= Arogalea soronella =

Scientific classification
- Domain: Eukaryota
- Kingdom: Animalia
- Phylum: Arthropoda
- Class: Insecta
- Order: Lepidoptera
- Family: Gelechiidae
- Genus: Arogalea
- Species: A. soronella

Binomial name
- Arogalea soronella Busck, 1914

Species of moth

Arogalea soronella is a moth of the family Gelechiidae. It is found in Panama.

The wingspan is 12–13 mm. The forewings are deep black with light yellow markings. There is an oblique yellow spot on the basal fourth of the costa and a yellow spot on the apical fourth of the costa, as well as a small yellow tuft of raised scales on the middle of the fold. Black scale tufts are found at the basal fourth and at the end of the cell, the latter with a few yellow scales. There is also a minute yellow dot at the tornus. The hindwings are blackish fuscous.
