= Arogalea archaea =

Scientific classification
- Domain: Eukaryota
- Kingdom: Animalia
- Phylum: Arthropoda
- Class: Insecta
- Order: Lepidoptera
- Family: Gelechiidae
- Genus: Arogalea
- Species: A. archaea

Binomial name
- Arogalea archaea Walsingham, 1911

Species of moth

Arogalea archaea is a moth of the family Gelechiidae. It is found in Mexico (Guerrero).

The wingspan is about 13 mm. The forewings are white, profusely dusted with olive-brown, with many brownish fuscous spots and mottlings and with a small one at the base of the costa, followed by another a little beyond it, a third lying below the base of the fold. A dorsal streak at about one-fifth crosses the fold upward and terminates on the cell. Above and beyond this are two more spots, one on the costa, one below and beyond it, these are followed by a broad brownish fuscous costal blotch, beyond the middle, which merges at its lower end in an olive-brown median shade, and opposite to it is a scarcely smaller dorsal blotch, the apical portion of the wing being mottled throughout with brownish fuscous, mixed with olive-brown. The hindwings are shining, pale grey.
