= Recurvaria picula =

Scientific classification
- Domain: Eukaryota
- Kingdom: Animalia
- Phylum: Arthropoda
- Class: Insecta
- Order: Lepidoptera
- Family: Gelechiidae
- Genus: Recurvaria
- Species: R. picula

Binomial name
- Recurvaria picula Walsingham, 1910

Species of moth

Recurvaria picula is a moth of the family Gelechiidae. It is found in Mexico (Veracruz).

The wingspan is about 10 mm. The forewings are white, slightly smeared with olivaceous brown between the black markings, which consist of four elongate costal spots, one at the base, forming the origin of an outwardly oblique black and brown fascia, in which some of the scales are slightly raised, reaching the dorsum at one-third from the base, one, scarcely before the middle, one beyond the middle, and a fourth, forming a somewhat broken patch, just before the apex. There is another mixed black and brownish spot on the dorsum before the tornus, while a little below each of the two middle costal spots is a black dot. The terminal cilia whitish, mottled with olivaceous brownish and the dorsal cilia grey. The hindwings are grey.
