= Recurvaria synestia =

Scientific classification
- Kingdom: Animalia
- Phylum: Arthropoda
- Class: Insecta
- Order: Lepidoptera
- Family: Gelechiidae
- Genus: Recurvaria
- Species: R. synestia

Binomial name
- Recurvaria synestia Meyrick, 1939

Species of moth

Recurvaria synestia is a moth of the family Gelechiidae. It is found in Argentina.
