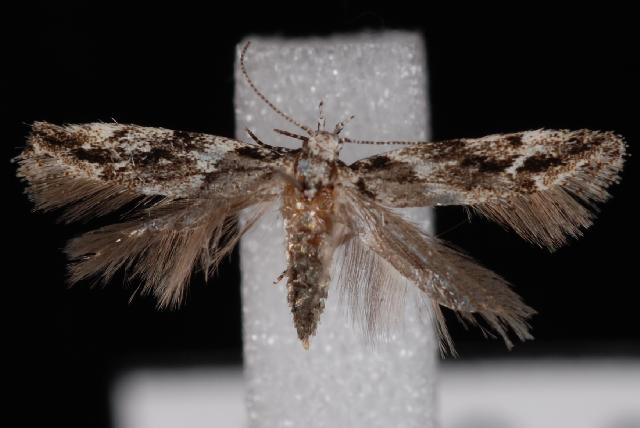

Scientific classification
- Domain: Eukaryota
- Kingdom: Animalia
- Phylum: Arthropoda
- Class: Insecta
- Order: Lepidoptera
- Family: Gelechiidae
- Genus: Recurvaria
- Species: R. nanella

Binomial name
- Recurvaria nanella (Denis & Schiffermüller, 1775)

Synonyms
- Tinea nanella Denis & Schiffermüller, 1775; Tinea pumilella [Denis & Schiffermüller], 1775; Recurvaria nana Haworth, 1828; Recurvaria crataegella Busck, 1903; Recurvaria srataegella Busck, 1903; Recurvaria nanella unicolor Rebel, 1927

= Recurvaria nanella =

Species of moth

Recurvaria nanella, the lesser bud moth, is a moth of the family Gelechiidae. It is widely distributed in Europe and is also found in Turkey, the Near East, North Africa (including Egypt), the Caucasus, Transcaucasia, Kazakhstan and south-eastern Siberia. It is also found in North America, where it is probably introduced.

The wingspan is 10–12 mm. Adults are on wing from July to August.
