= Xenolechia pseudovulgella =

Scientific classification
- Kingdom: Animalia
- Phylum: Arthropoda
- Clade: Pancrustacea
- Class: Insecta
- Order: Lepidoptera
- Family: Gelechiidae
- Genus: Xenolechia
- Species: X. pseudovulgella

Binomial name
- Xenolechia pseudovulgella Huemer & Karsholt, 1999

Species of moth

Xenolechia pseudovulgella is a moth of the family Gelechiidae. It is found in southern Greece and Turkey.
