= Recurvaria xanthotricha =

Scientific classification
- Kingdom: Animalia
- Phylum: Arthropoda
- Class: Insecta
- Order: Lepidoptera
- Family: Gelechiidae
- Genus: Recurvaria
- Species: R. xanthotricha

Binomial name
- Recurvaria xanthotricha Meyrick, 1917

Species of moth

Recurvaria xanthotricha is a moth of the family Gelechiidae. It is found in Peru.

The wingspan is 8–9 mm. The forewings are whitish, irregularly irrorated with grey and dark fuscous. The markings are suffused, blackish, more or less confused with the dark irroration. There is a spot on the base of the costa and a curved oblique series of three spots (costal, plical, dorsal) towards the base, followed by a more or less developed narrow white fascia. There is a subcostal dot at one-fourth and spots on the costa at two-fifths and two-thirds. The stigmata are represented by cloudy dots, the plical slightly beyond the first discal. There is also a spot on the tornus and sometimes an irregular angulated fine whitish transverse line is traceable beyond this. The hindwings are pale greyish.
