= Recurvaria insequens =

Scientific classification
- Kingdom: Animalia
- Phylum: Arthropoda
- Class: Insecta
- Order: Lepidoptera
- Family: Gelechiidae
- Genus: Recurvaria
- Species: R. insequens

Binomial name
- Recurvaria insequens Meyrick, 1931

Species of moth

Recurvaria insequens is a moth of the family Gelechiidae. It is found in Brazil.
