= Recurvaria flagellifer =

Scientific classification
- Kingdom: Animalia
- Phylum: Arthropoda
- Clade: Pancrustacea
- Class: Insecta
- Order: Lepidoptera
- Family: Gelechiidae
- Genus: Recurvaria
- Species: R. flagellifer

Binomial name
- Recurvaria flagellifer Walsingham, 1910

Synonyms
- Coleotechnites flagellifer

Species of moth

Recurvaria flagellifer is a moth of the family Gelechiidae. It lives in Mexico (Guerrero).

The wingspan is 11–13 mm. The forewings are dirty white profusely sprinkled with brown fuscous, with numerous small spots of pale, slightly raised scales. The fuscous clouding tends to assume the form of oblique shades descending outward from the costa, but these are so confused and ill-defined that they do not constitute true bands or fasciae, nor do they reach the dorsum. The first of these is near the base and can be traced to the fold and a little beyond it, the second is a little before the middle, rather less oblique, but in some specimens more strongly marked than the first and the third consists mainly of a larger dark fuscous cloud before the commencement of the costal cilia, and opposite to this is a smaller patch on the dorsum, the terminal portion of the wing being also more or less suffused. The hindwings are shining pale grey.
