= Recurvaria ornatipalpella =

Scientific classification
- Domain: Eukaryota
- Kingdom: Animalia
- Phylum: Arthropoda
- Class: Insecta
- Order: Lepidoptera
- Family: Gelechiidae
- Genus: Recurvaria
- Species: R. ornatipalpella

Binomial name
- Recurvaria ornatipalpella (Walsingham, 1897)

Synonyms
- Aristotelia ornatipalpella Walsingham, 1897; Taygete ornatipalpella

Species of moth

Recurvaria ornatipalpella is a moth of the family Gelechiidae. It is found in the West Indies, where it has been recorded from Grenada.

The wingspan is about 8 mm (0.31 in). The forewings are olive-grey, with a slight greenish tinge and a short black basal patch occupying the costal half, which is followed by a smaller costal patch at one-third, with a black dorsal patch a little beyond it. At the upper extremity of the latter is a round black spot on the cell, almost connected with it. Another small black costal patch lies at the commencement of the costal cilia and a round black dot beneath it at the end of the cell. A few black scales are scattered along the termen at the base of the olive-grey cilia. The hindwings are shining and grey.
