= Recurvaria nothostigma =

Scientific classification
- Kingdom: Animalia
- Phylum: Arthropoda
- Class: Insecta
- Order: Lepidoptera
- Family: Gelechiidae
- Genus: Recurvaria
- Species: R. nothostigma

Binomial name
- Recurvaria nothostigma Meyrick, 1914

Species of moth

Recurvaria nothostigma is a moth of the family Gelechiidae. It is found in Guyana.

The wingspan is 7–8 mm. The forewings are whitish closely irrorated with grey and with dark grey markings sprinkled with black and indistinctly edged with yellowish suffusion and posteriorly with whitish. There are spots on the costa near the base, before the middle, at two-thirds, and a longer one towards the apex, the first connected with the base by a subcostal dash. There are dots in the disc at one-fourth and the middle, the first connected with the dorsum by an obscure yellowish-grey bar, the second with an indistinct spot beneath and slightly before it. There is a triangular spot on the tornus opposite the third costal spot, followed by a roundish grey patch including a minute black dot. An irregular suffused spot is found within the apex. The hindwings are grey, paler anteriorly.
