= Recurvaria ochrospila =

Scientific classification
- Kingdom: Animalia
- Phylum: Arthropoda
- Class: Insecta
- Order: Lepidoptera
- Family: Gelechiidae
- Genus: Recurvaria
- Species: R. ochrospila

Binomial name
- Recurvaria ochrospila Meyrick, 1934

Species of moth

Recurvaria ochrospila is a moth of the family Gelechiidae. It is found in India.

The larvae feed between appressed leaves of Ougeinia dalbergioides.
