= Arogalea melitoptila =

Scientific classification
- Kingdom: Animalia
- Phylum: Arthropoda
- Class: Insecta
- Order: Lepidoptera
- Family: Gelechiidae
- Genus: Arogalea
- Species: A. melitoptila

Binomial name
- Arogalea melitoptila (Meyrick, 1923)

Synonyms
- Telphusa melitoptila Meyrick, 1923

Species of moth

Arogalea melitoptila is a moth of the family Gelechiidae. It is found in Brazil.

The wingspan is about 15 mm. The forewings are dark purple-fuscous, the markings formed of erect scales, clear yellow, edged with black scales. There is a rather oblique fasciate blotch from the costa at one-fourth reaching three-fourths across the wing. There are small spots on the fold in the middle of the wing and at the extremity, as well as larger spots in the disc at two-thirds and on the costa beyond this, almost confluent. There is also a round apical dot. The hindwings are dark grey, thinly scaled in the disc.
