= Xenolechia basistrigella =

Scientific classification
- Kingdom: Animalia
- Phylum: Arthropoda
- Clade: Pancrustacea
- Class: Insecta
- Order: Lepidoptera
- Family: Gelechiidae
- Genus: Xenolechia
- Species: X. basistrigella

Binomial name
- Xenolechia basistrigella (Zeller, 1873)

Synonyms
- Gelechia (Poecilia?) basistrigella Zeller, 1873

Species of moth

Xenolechia basistrigella is a moth of the family Gelechiidae. It is found in North America, where it has been recorded from Texas.
