= Recurvaria sartor =

Scientific classification
- Kingdom: Animalia
- Phylum: Arthropoda
- Class: Insecta
- Order: Lepidoptera
- Family: Gelechiidae
- Genus: Recurvaria
- Species: R. sartor

Binomial name
- Recurvaria sartor Walsingham, 1910

Species of moth

Recurvaria sartor is a moth of the family Gelechiidae. It is found in Mexico (Guerrero).

The wingspan is about 11 mm (0.43 in). The forewings are fawn-brownish, with a lilac tinge, the costa is slightly shaded along the basal half. There is a patch of black raised scales on the dorsum at one-fourth, partially connected by blackish scaling along the dorsum, with a second smaller but otherwise similar spot at about two-thirds. The hindwings are pale shining silvery grey.
