= Recurvaria saxea =

Scientific classification
- Kingdom: Animalia
- Phylum: Arthropoda
- Clade: Pancrustacea
- Class: Insecta
- Order: Lepidoptera
- Family: Gelechiidae
- Genus: Recurvaria
- Species: R. saxea

Binomial name
- Recurvaria saxea Meyrick, 1923

Species of moth

Recurvaria saxea is a moth of the family Gelechiidae. It is found in Brazil (Para).

The wingspan is 7–8 mm. The forewings are rather dark grey, the points of the scales finely whitish-ochreous or whitish and with a small blackish spot on the costa towards the base and small oblique whitish strigulae on the costa at the middle and three-fourths, preceded by spots of blackish suffusion, the second large. There is a black dot beneath the costa at one-third and a round black dot below the fold at one-third, one above the fold somewhat before it. The stigmata are black, raised, accompanied by whitish scales, the plical less marked, rather before the first discal, similar dots near the dorsum beyond the middle and towards the tornus. There is a whitish dot on the tornus and an indistinct blackish dash in the disc posteriorly, as well as some blackish speckling towards the apex. The hindwings are dark grey.
