= Recurvaria penetrans =

Scientific classification
- Kingdom: Animalia
- Phylum: Arthropoda
- Class: Insecta
- Order: Lepidoptera
- Family: Gelechiidae
- Genus: Recurvaria
- Species: R. penetrans

Binomial name
- Recurvaria penetrans Meyrick, 1923

Synonyms
- Coleotechnites penetrans

Species of moth

Recurvaria penetrans is a moth of the family Gelechiidae. It is found in Brazil (Amazonas).

The wingspan is about 9 mm. The forewings are ochreous-whitish irregularly irrorated grey and with oblique black marks from the costa at and near the base. There are small blackish tufts above and below the fold at one-fourth, and a slightly incurved very oblique black streak from the costa before the middle to the disc at three-fourths. There is also a small black tuft on the fold in the middle and small blackish opposite spots on the costa at three-fourths and the tornus. A black dot is found in the disc at four-fifths and there is an elongate inwards oblique black mark from the costa near the apex, as well as minute linear black marks on the costa posteriorly and on the termen. The hindwings are pale greyish.
