= Recurvaria dryozona =

Scientific classification
- Kingdom: Animalia
- Phylum: Arthropoda
- Class: Insecta
- Order: Lepidoptera
- Family: Gelechiidae
- Genus: Recurvaria
- Species: R. dryozona

Binomial name
- Recurvaria dryozona (Meyrick, 1916)

Synonyms
- Epithectis dryozona Meyrick, 1916

Species of moth

Recurvaria dryozona is a moth of the family Gelechiidae. It is found in Sri Lanka and India (Bengal).

The wingspan is about 8 mm. The forewings are grey or grey-whitish closely irrorated with blackish. The markings are light ochreous-brown. There is a narrow slightly curved transverse fascia before the middle, a small spot in disc at three-fourths, and another at the apex. The hindwings are grey.
