= Recurvaria eromene =

Scientific classification
- Domain: Eukaryota
- Kingdom: Animalia
- Phylum: Arthropoda
- Class: Insecta
- Order: Lepidoptera
- Family: Gelechiidae
- Genus: Recurvaria
- Species: R. eromene

Binomial name
- Recurvaria eromene (Walsingham, 1897)

Synonyms
- Aristotelia eromene Walsingham, 1897; Taygete eromene

Species of moth

Recurvaria eromene is a moth of the family Gelechiidae. It is found in the West Indies, where it has been recorded from Saint Thomas, Saint Croix and Puerto Rico.

The wingspan is about 9 mm. The forewings are pale ochreous, somewhat shaded with chestnut-brown along the middle and with an elongate black costal spot at the base with a smaller one immediately beneath it. There is also a small triangular costal spot before the middle, almost connected with two others placed obliquely beneath it, extending backward to the dorsum. A larger black triangular costal spot is located before the commencement of the costal cilia. There is also a slender black streak on the dorsum, beneath and before it, a little beyond the middle, not leaving the margin. There is a terminal series of small groups of black scales at the base of the greyish-ochreous cilia. The hindwings are shining, pale grey.

The larvae feed on Bromelia pinguin.
