= Xenolechia ceanothiae =

Scientific classification
- Kingdom: Animalia
- Phylum: Arthropoda
- Clade: Pancrustacea
- Class: Insecta
- Order: Lepidoptera
- Family: Gelechiidae
- Genus: Xenolechia
- Species: X. ceanothiae

Binomial name
- Xenolechia ceanothiae Priest, 2014

Species of moth

Xenolechia ceanothiae is a moth of the family Gelechiidae. It is found in North America, where it has been recorded from Michigan.

The length of the forewings is 4.5−6 mm. There seems to be one generation per year with larvae present mid-September to late October.
