= Recurvaria ostariella =

Scientific classification
- Kingdom: Animalia
- Phylum: Arthropoda
- Class: Insecta
- Order: Lepidoptera
- Family: Gelechiidae
- Genus: Recurvaria
- Species: R. ostariella

Binomial name
- Recurvaria ostariella (Walsingham, 1897)

Synonyms
- Aristotelia ostariella Walsingham, 1897; Taygete ostariella

Species of moth

Recurvaria ostariella is a moth of the family Gelechiidae. It is found in the West Indies, where it has been recorded from Saint Thomas.

The wingspan is about 8 mm. The forewings are bone-whitish with a small greyish-fuscous spot at the base of the costa, followed by a small triangular costal spot before the middle, forming, with two others below it, a narrow transverse fascia tending slightly outwards to the dorsum. Halfway between this and the apex is another greyish-fuscous costal patch with a dark fuscous spot below it at the end of the cell. There are also a few greyish-fuscous scales around the termen at the base of the bone-ochreous cilia. The hindwings are shining, very pale grey.
