= Recurvaria kittella =

Scientific classification
- Domain: Eukaryota
- Kingdom: Animalia
- Phylum: Arthropoda
- Class: Insecta
- Order: Lepidoptera
- Family: Gelechiidae
- Genus: Recurvaria
- Species: R. kittella

Binomial name
- Recurvaria kittella (Walsingham, 1897)

Synonyms
- Aristotelia kittella Walsingham, 1897

Species of moth

Recurvaria kittella is a moth of the family Gelechiidae. It is found in the West Indies, where it has been recorded from Haiti and Puerto Rico.

The wingspan is about 7 mm. The forewings are cream-white, with a small black costal spot at the base, a broad black transverse fascia before the middle, slightly attenuated at its centre, and a triangular black costal spot halfway between the fascia and the apex, this is preceded by a small black spot on the dorsum and followed by a few black scales on the termen below the apex. The hindwings are shining, very pale grey.
