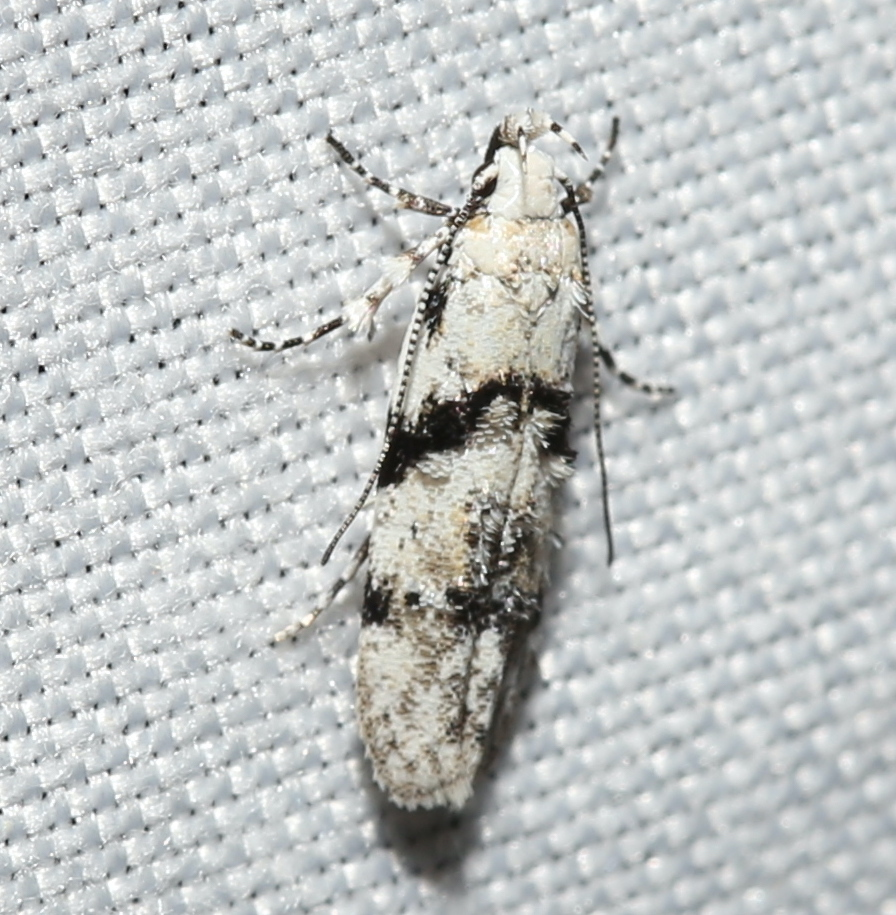

Scientific classification
- Kingdom: Animalia
- Phylum: Arthropoda
- Clade: Pancrustacea
- Class: Insecta
- Order: Lepidoptera
- Family: Gelechiidae
- Genus: Arogalea
- Species: A. cristifasciella

Binomial name
- Arogalea cristifasciella (Chambers, 1878)

Synonyms
- Gelechia cristifasciella Chambers, 1878; Gelechia (Poecilia) inscripta Walsingham, 1882

= Arogalea cristifasciella =

Species of moth

Arogalea cristifasciella, the stripe-backed moth, is a moth of the family Gelechiidae. It is found in North America, where it has been recorded from Alabama, Arkansas, Connecticut, Florida, Georgia, Illinois, Indiana, Kansas, Kentucky, Louisiana, Maine, Maryland, Massachusetts, Michigan, Mississippi, Missouri, New Hampshire, New Jersey, New York, North Carolina, Ohio, Oklahoma, Ontario, Quebec, South Carolina, Tennessee, Texas, Virginia, West Virginia and Wisconsin.

The length of the forewings is about 5 mm. Adults have been recorded on wing from January to August.
