= Xenolechia ceanothiella =

Scientific classification
- Kingdom: Animalia
- Phylum: Arthropoda
- Class: Insecta
- Order: Lepidoptera
- Family: Gelechiidae
- Genus: Xenolechia
- Species: X. ceanothiella

Binomial name
- Xenolechia ceanothiella (Braun, 1921)

Synonyms
- Recurvaria ceanothiella Braun, 1921

Species of moth

Xenolechia ceanothiella is a moth of the family Gelechiidae. It is found in North America, where it has been recorded from California.

The wingspan is 50−78 mm. The forewings are whitish, densely dusted with dark fuscous and with three darker shades crossing the wing obliquely, at one-fourth, one-half and three-fourths respectively, sometimes scarcely distinguishable from the rest of the wing except as dark patches on the costa. Between the first of these and the base of the wing, a small black spot is found on the costa and between the first and second dark shade a black spot is located within the costa. Beyond the third dark shade, a narrow whitish streak, sometimes almost obliterated by dusting, curves inward just within the costa, then runs obliquely outward to the termen just beyond the tornus. A more or less distinct black dot is found in the apex, preceded by one or two more or less distinct black dots on the costa and termen. Three large patches of black raised scales are found in a line about equally spaced, the first two in the fold, the third above it, and lying in the dark shades. Nearer the base than the first of these, is a small black spot on the dorsal margin.

The larvae feed on Ceanothus divaricatus. They mine the leaves of their host plant. The mine starts on the lower side of the leaf, usually near the midrib. The mine is linear at first, but becomes blotchlike later. Pupation takes place in a cocoon between two leaves spun together with silk.
