= Recurvaria rhombophorella =

Scientific classification
- Kingdom: Animalia
- Phylum: Arthropoda
- Clade: Pancrustacea
- Class: Insecta
- Order: Lepidoptera
- Family: Gelechiidae
- Genus: Recurvaria
- Species: R. rhombophorella

Binomial name
- Recurvaria rhombophorella (Zeller, 1877)

Synonyms
- Gelechia (Teleia) rhombophorella Zeller, 1877

Species of moth

Recurvaria rhombophorella is a moth of the family Gelechiidae. It is found in Colombia.
