= Recurvaria costimaculella =

Scientific classification
- Kingdom: Animalia
- Phylum: Arthropoda
- Clade: Pancrustacea
- Class: Insecta
- Order: Lepidoptera
- Family: Gelechiidae
- Genus: Recurvaria
- Species: R. costimaculella

Binomial name
- Recurvaria costimaculella Huemer & Karsholt, 2001

Species of moth

Recurvaria costimaculella is a moth of the family Gelechiidae. It is found on Sicily.
