= Recurvaria toxicodendri =

Scientific classification
- Domain: Eukaryota
- Kingdom: Animalia
- Phylum: Arthropoda
- Class: Insecta
- Order: Lepidoptera
- Family: Gelechiidae
- Genus: Recurvaria
- Species: R. toxicodendri

Binomial name
- Recurvaria toxicodendri Kuznetsov, 1979

Species of moth

Recurvaria toxicodendri is a moth of the family Gelechiidae. It is found in Russia.
