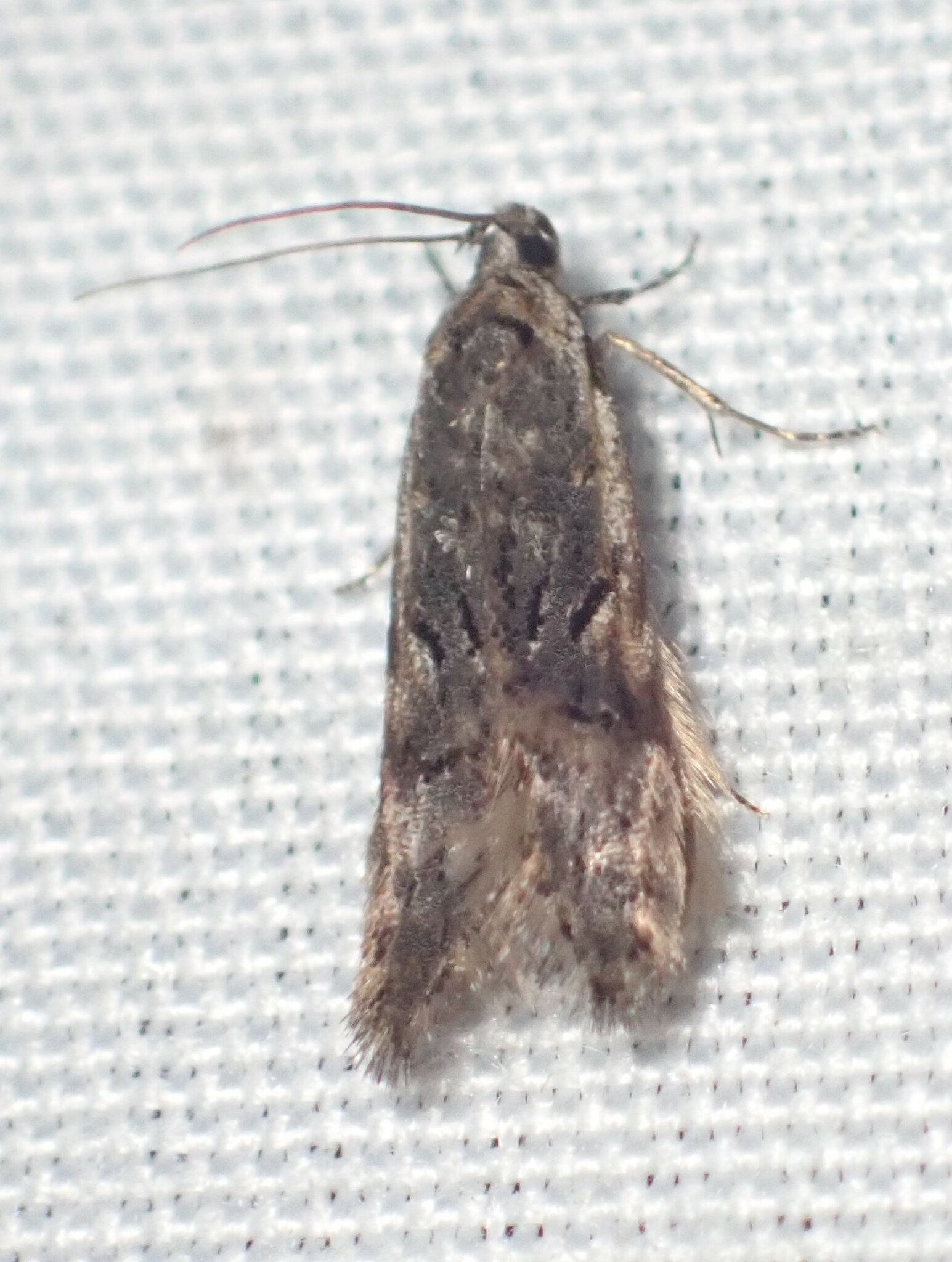

Scientific classification
- Domain: Eukaryota
- Kingdom: Animalia
- Phylum: Arthropoda
- Class: Insecta
- Order: Lepidoptera
- Family: Gelechiidae
- Genus: Xenolechia
- Species: X. velatella

Binomial name
- Xenolechia velatella Busck, 1907

= Xenolechia velatella =

Species of moth

Xenolechia velatella is a species of moth in the family Gelechiidae. It is found in North America, where it has been recorded from Alberta, Arizona and British Columbia.

== Description ==
The wingspan is about 14 mm. The forewings are clothed with very long, narrow speckled scales. The ground colour is white, heavily overlaid with ochreous and fuscous on the basal two thirds of the wing. The apical third is also sprinkled with dark scales, but to a lesser extent and appears quite light contrasted with the basal part. Near the base is an oblique, outwardly directed, black costal streak, reaching the fold and followed by a white space only slightly sprinkled with dark scales. There are two longitudinal rows of tufts of raised scales, one through the middle of the wing with the first tuft at the basal third, the second on the middle of the wing, and the third at the end of the cell. The other row with two tufts below the fold and the third just below the end of the cell. The hindwings are light fuscous.
