= Recurvaria thysanota =

Scientific classification
- Domain: Eukaryota
- Kingdom: Animalia
- Phylum: Arthropoda
- Class: Insecta
- Order: Lepidoptera
- Family: Gelechiidae
- Genus: Recurvaria
- Species: R. thysanota

Binomial name
- Recurvaria thysanota Walsingham, 1910

Synonyms
- Coleotechnites thysanota

Species of moth

Recurvaria thysanota is a moth of the family Gelechiidae. It is found in Mexico (Guerrero).

The wingspan is about 10 mm. The forewings are chalky-white, somewhat shaded and sprinkled with brownish fuscous and with a dark brownish fuscous line on the base along the fold and another from the middle of the wing to above the apex, blended by brownish shading on the basal half of the cell. A small fuscous dot lies a little above the outer extremity of the fold, and there is another at the extreme apex. The apical and subapical cilia are whitish, sprinkled with brownish fuscous, while the tornal cilia is unsprinkled, inclining to brownish ochreous. The hindwings are shining, pale steely grey.
