= Xenolechia querciphaga =

Scientific classification
- Kingdom: Animalia
- Phylum: Arthropoda
- Class: Insecta
- Order: Lepidoptera
- Family: Gelechiidae
- Genus: Xenolechia
- Species: X. querciphaga

Binomial name
- Xenolechia querciphaga Keifer, 1933

Species of moth

Xenolechia querciphaga is a moth of the family Gelechiidae. It is found in North America, where it has been recorded from Alabama, Arkansas, California, Mississippi and Texas.

The wingspan is 11–12 mm. The forewings are grey, often with a darker spot or tuft at the plical base. Tufts and some raised scales are present, the tufts usually blackish or somewhat darker than general wing colour. The hindwings are lighter grey than the forewings.

The larvae feed on Quercus wislizenii and Quercus douglasii. The larvae have a green body and light amber head.
