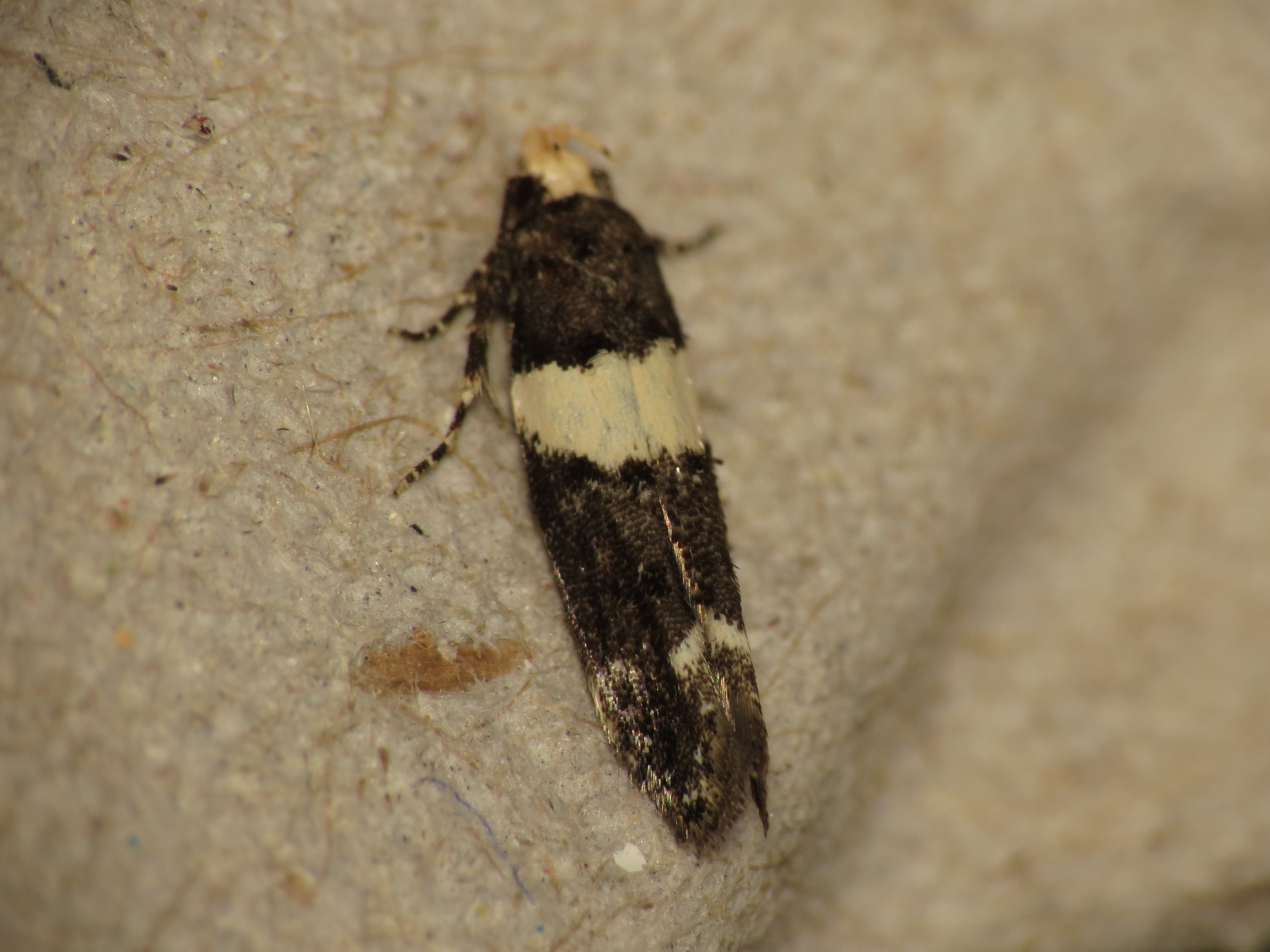
- Recurvaria leucatella

Scientific classification
- Kingdom: Animalia
- Phylum: Arthropoda
- Clade: Pancrustacea
- Class: Insecta
- Order: Lepidoptera
- Family: Gelechiidae
- Subfamily: Gelechiinae
- Tribe: Litini
- Genus: Recurvaria; Haworth, 1828

Synonyms
- Lita Kollar, 1832; Telea Stephens, 1834 (preocc. by Hübner, 1819); Aphanaula Meyrick, 1895; Hinnebergia Spuler, 1910

= Recurvaria =

Genus of moths

Recurvaria is a genus of moths in the family Gelechiidae.

== Species ==
- Recurvaria annulicornis (Walsingham, 1897)
- Recurvaria cinerella Chretien, 1908
- Recurvaria comprobata (Meyrick, 1935)
- Recurvaria consimilis Braun, 1930
- Recurvaria costimaculella Huemer & Karsholt, 2001
- Recurvaria dryozona (Meyrick, 1916)
- Recurvaria eromene (Walsingham, 1897)
- Recurvaria febriculella (Zeller, 1877)
- Recurvaria filicornis (Zeller, 1877)
- Recurvaria flagellifer Walsingham, 1910
- Recurvaria francisca Keifer, 1928
- Recurvaria insequens Meyrick, 1931
- Recurvaria intermissella (Zeller, 1877)
- Recurvaria kittella (Walsingham, 1897)
- Recurvaria leucatella (Clerck, 1759) - white-barred groundling moth
- Recurvaria melanostictella (Zeller, 1877)
- Recurvaria merismatella (Zeller, 1877)
- Recurvaria nanella (Denis & Schiffermuller, 1775) - lesser bud moth
- Recurvaria nothostigma Meyrick, 1914
- Recurvaria ochrospila Meyrick, 1934
- Recurvaria ornatipalpella (Walsingham, 1897)
- Recurvaria ostariella (Walsingham, 1897)
- Recurvaria penetrans Meyrick, 1923
- Recurvaria picula Walsingham, 1910
- Recurvaria pleurosaris Meyrick, 1923
- Recurvaria putella Busck, 1914
- Recurvaria rhicnota Walsingham, 1910
- Recurvaria rhombophorella (Zeller, 1877)
- Recurvaria sartor Walsingham, 1910
- Recurvaria saxea Meyrick, 1923
- Recurvaria senariella (Zeller, 1877)
- Recurvaria stibomorpha Meyrick, 1929
- Recurvaria sticta Walsingham, 1910
- Recurvaria synestia Meyrick, 1939
- Recurvaria taphiopis Meyrick, 1929
- Recurvaria thiodes Meyrick, 1917
- Recurvaria thomeriella (Chretien, 1901)
- Recurvaria thysanota Walsingham, 1910
- Recurvaria toxicodendri Kuznetsov, 1979
- Recurvaria trigonophorella (Zeller, 1877)
- Recurvaria vestigata Meyrick, 1929
- Recurvaria xanthotricha Meyrick, 1917
