= Parachronistis jiriensis =

Scientific classification
- Domain: Eukaryota
- Kingdom: Animalia
- Phylum: Arthropoda
- Class: Insecta
- Order: Lepidoptera
- Family: Gelechiidae
- Genus: Parachronistis
- Species: P. jiriensis

Binomial name
- Parachronistis jiriensis Park, 1985

Species of moth

Parachronistis jiriensis is a moth of the family Gelechiidae. It is found in Korea and the Russian Far East.

The wingspan is 10–13 mm. Adults are similar to Parachronistis maritima, but can be distinguished by the more blackish or dark grey ground colour.
