= Parachronistis sellaris =

Scientific classification
- Domain: Eukaryota
- Kingdom: Animalia
- Phylum: Arthropoda
- Class: Insecta
- Order: Lepidoptera
- Family: Gelechiidae
- Genus: Parachronistis
- Species: P. sellaris

Binomial name
- Parachronistis sellaris Park, 1985

Species of moth

Parachronistis sellaris is a moth of the family Gelechiidae. It is found in Korea and the Russian Far East.

Its wingspan is 11–13.5 mm (0.43–0.53 in). Adults are on wing from early May to mid-August.
