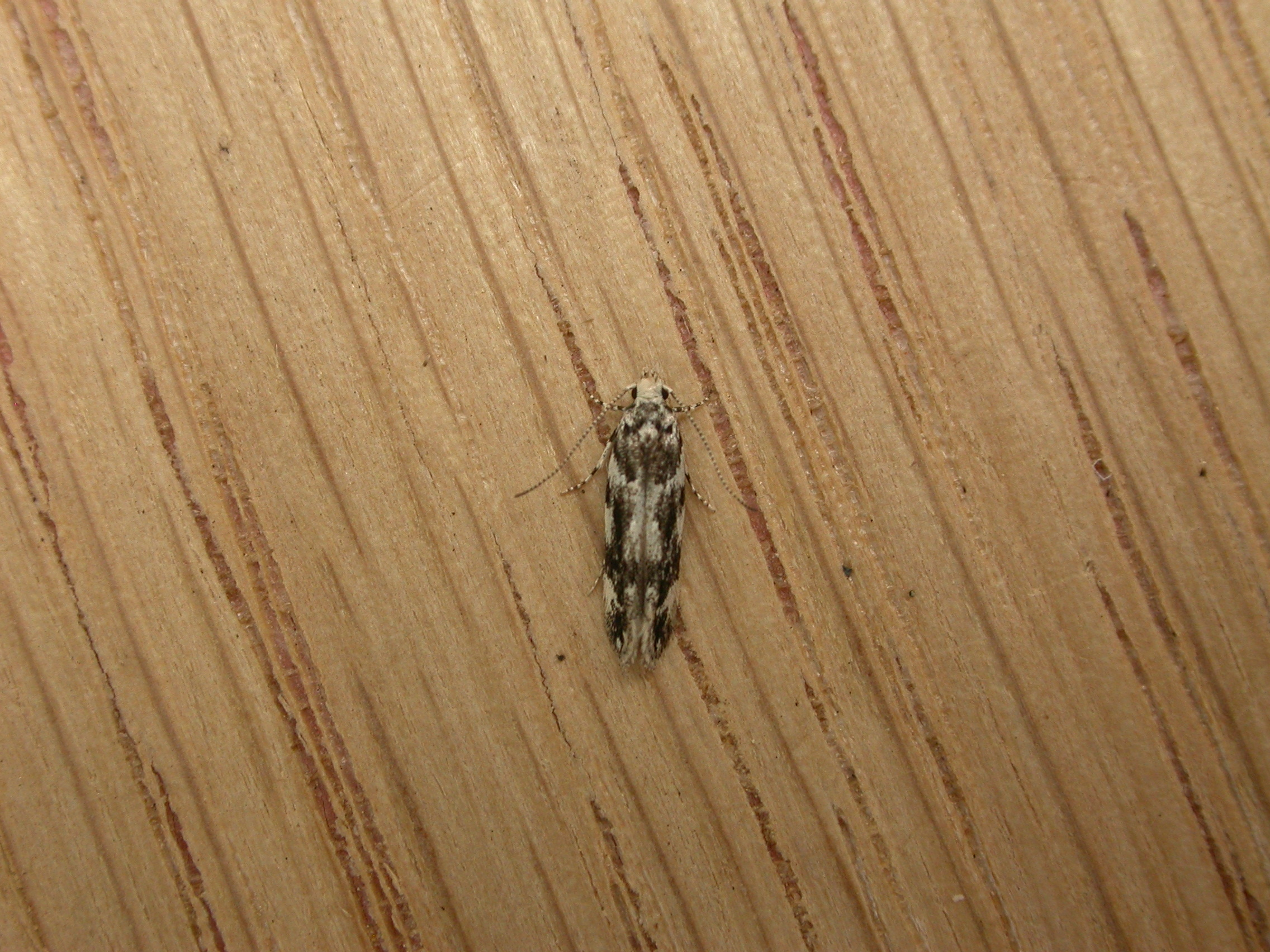

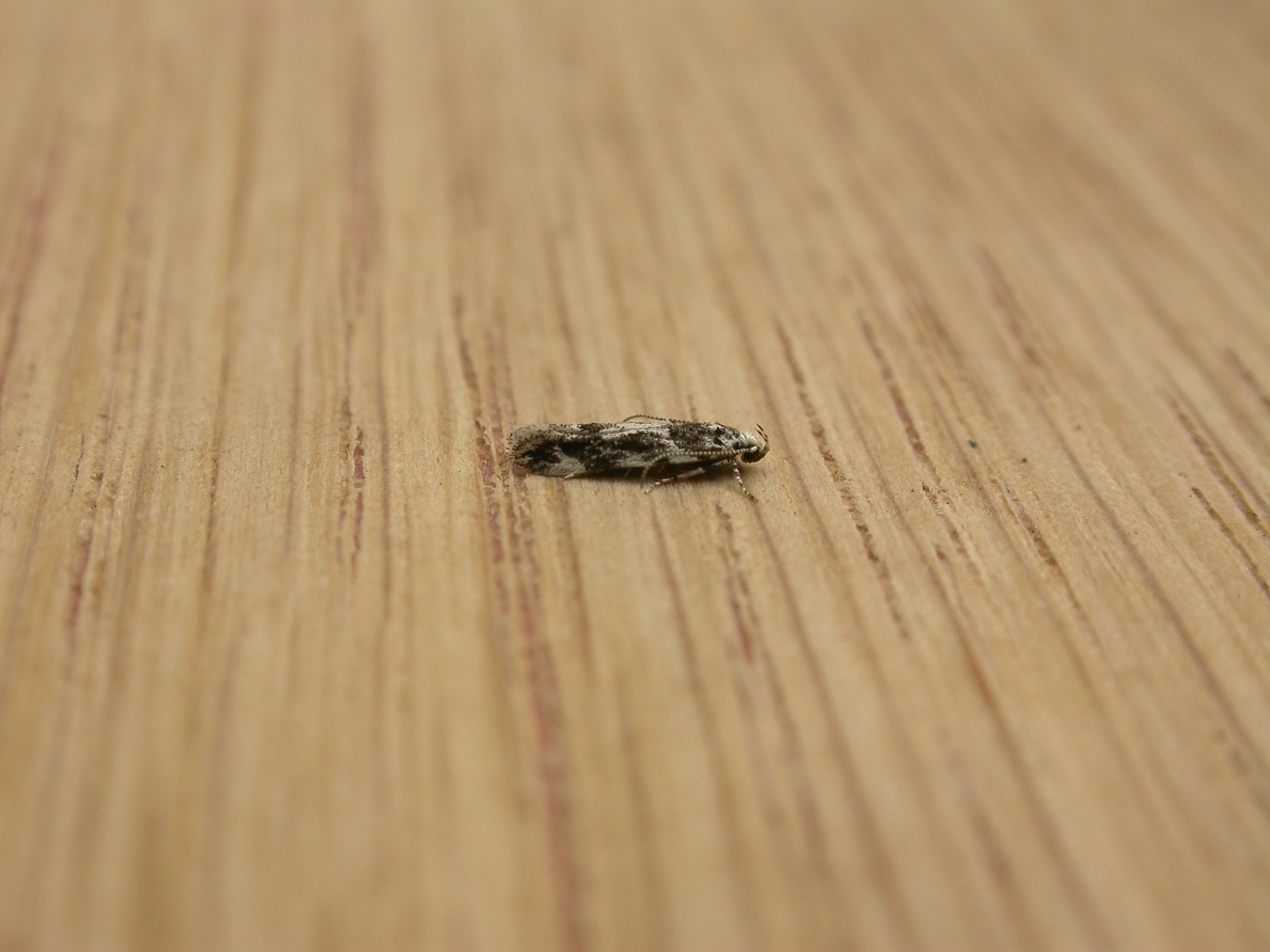

Scientific classification
- Kingdom: Animalia
- Phylum: Arthropoda
- Clade: Pancrustacea
- Class: Insecta
- Order: Lepidoptera
- Family: Gelechiidae
- Genus: Parachronistis
- Species: P. albiceps

Binomial name
- Parachronistis albiceps (Zeller, 1839)

Synonyms
- Gelechia albiceps Zeller, 1839; Gelechia albicipitella Herrich-Schäffer, 1854; Gelechia albicapitella Doubleday, 1859

= Parachronistis albiceps =

Species of moth

Parachronistis albiceps, the wood groundling, is a moth of the family Gelechiidae. It is found in most of Europe, except the Iberian Peninsula and part of the Balkan Peninsula. Outside of Europe, it is found in southern Siberia (Transbaikalia, Altai), the Russian Far East and Korea.

The wingspan is 10–12 mm. Adults are on wing in June and July.

The larvae feed on Corylus (including Corylus avellana), Ulmus and Prunus persica species. They feed inside the buds of their host plant.
