= Parachronistis fumea =

Scientific classification
- Domain: Eukaryota
- Kingdom: Animalia
- Phylum: Arthropoda
- Class: Insecta
- Order: Lepidoptera
- Family: Gelechiidae
- Genus: Parachronistis
- Species: P. fumea

Binomial name
- Parachronistis fumea Omelko, 1986

Synonyms
- Parachronistis (Cochlevalva) fumea

Species of moth

Parachronistis fumea is a moth of the family Gelechiidae. It is found in Japan and Russia.
