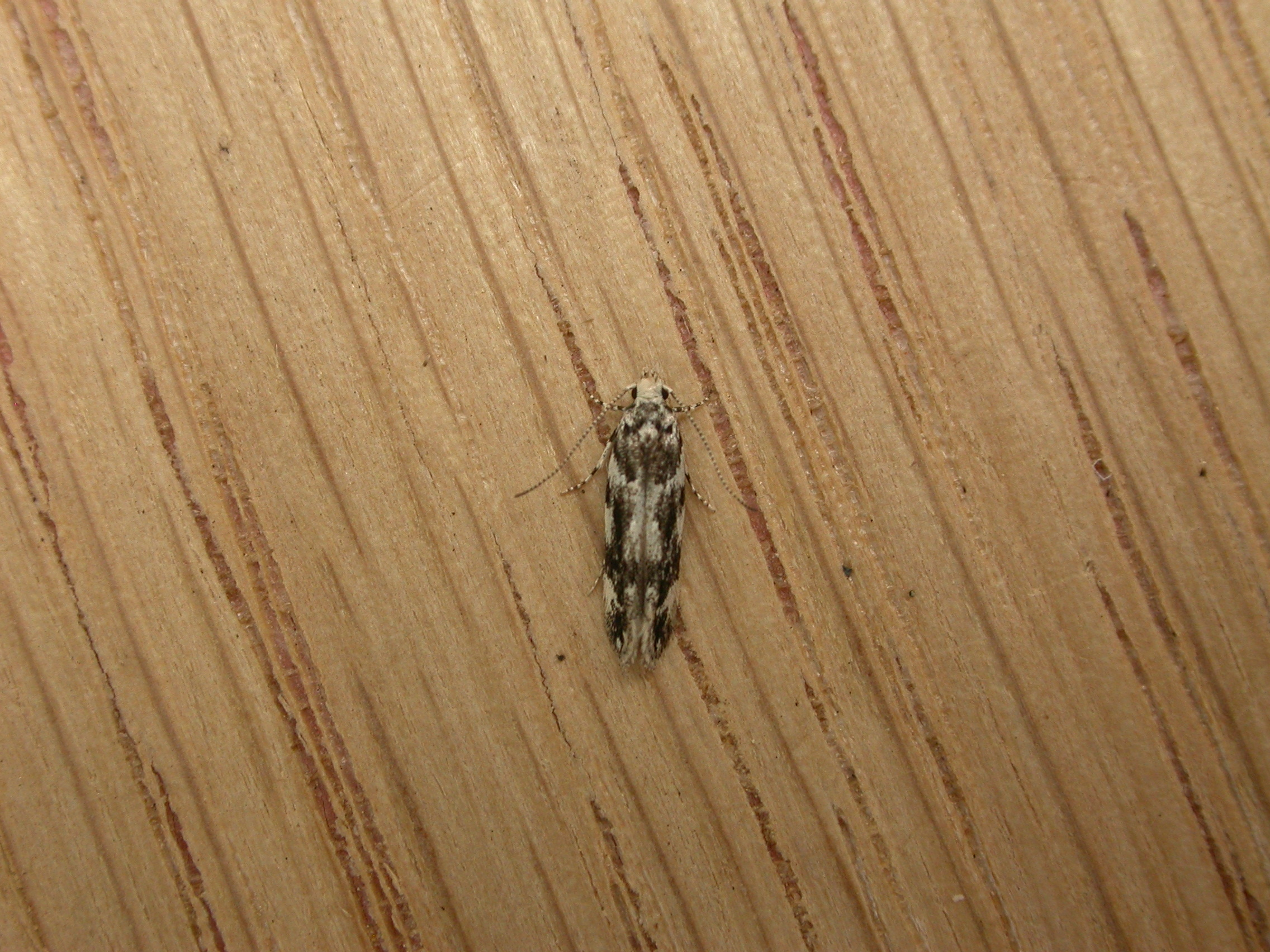
- Parachronistis albiceps

Scientific classification
- Kingdom: Animalia
- Phylum: Arthropoda
- Class: Insecta
- Order: Lepidoptera
- Family: Gelechiidae
- Subfamily: Gelechiinae
- Tribe: Litini
- Genus: Parachronistis; Meyrick, 1925

Synonyms
- Cochlevalva Omelko, 1986; Dentivalva Omelko, 1986

= Parachronistis =

Genus of moths

Parachronistis is a genus of moths in the family Gelechiidae.

== Species ==
- Parachronistis albiceps (Zeller, 1839)
- Parachronistis destillans (Meyrick, 1918)
- Parachronistis fumea Omelko, 1986
- Parachronistis geniculella Park, 1989
- Parachronistis jiriensis Park, 1985
- Parachronistis maritima Omelko, 1986
- Parachronistis sellaris Park, 1985
