= Parachronistis geniculella =

Scientific classification
- Domain: Eukaryota
- Kingdom: Animalia
- Phylum: Arthropoda
- Class: Insecta
- Order: Lepidoptera
- Family: Gelechiidae
- Genus: Parachronistis
- Species: P. geniculella

Binomial name
- Parachronistis geniculella Park, 1989

Species of moth

Parachronistis geniculella is a moth of the family Gelechiidae. It is found in Korea.

The wingspan is 10-11.5 mm.
