= Parachronistis maritima =

Scientific classification
- Domain: Eukaryota
- Kingdom: Animalia
- Phylum: Arthropoda
- Class: Insecta
- Order: Lepidoptera
- Family: Gelechiidae
- Genus: Parachronistis
- Species: P. maritima

Binomial name
- Parachronistis maritima Omelko, 1986

Synonyms
- Parachronistis (Dentivalva) maritima

Species of moth

Parachronistis maritima is a moth of the family Gelechiidae. It is found in Korea, Japan and the Russian Far East.

The wingspan is about 9.5 mm.
