= Scrobipalpa indignella =

Scientific classification
- Kingdom: Animalia
- Phylum: Arthropoda
- Clade: Pancrustacea
- Class: Insecta
- Order: Lepidoptera
- Family: Gelechiidae
- Genus: Scrobipalpa
- Species: S. indignella

Binomial name
- Scrobipalpa indignella (Staudinger, 1879)

Synonyms
- Bryotropha indignella Staudinger, 1879; Gnorimoschema pseudoobsoletellum Gregor & Povolný, 1955; Gnorimoschema hyoscyamivora Gerasimov, 1940; Scrobipalpa grossa Povolný, 1966

Species of moth

Scrobipalpa indignella is a moth of the family Gelechiidae. It is found in southern Russia, Ukraine, and from the Near East and Middle East to Afghanistan and China (Xinjiang).

The length of the forewings is 6–8.5 mm (0.24–0.33 in).
