= Paraxenoacria =

Scientific classification
- Kingdom: Animalia
- Phylum: Arthropoda
- Class: Insecta
- Order: Lepidoptera
- Family: Peleopodidae
- Genus: Paraxenoacria Rayhan & Jahan, 2024
- Species: P. spinosa

Binomial name
- Paraxenoacria spinosa Rayhan & Jahan, 2024

Genus of moth from Bangladesh

Paraxenoacria is a genus of moths belonging to the family Peleopodidae distributed in the South-East Asia, and has been reported from Bangladesh, India, Thailand, Laos, Cambodia, Singapore, and Malaysia. It was described by Md Jahir Rayhan and Sayema Jahan based on specimens collected from Chittagong, Bangladesh.

== Description ==
Among the genera currently classified within the family Peleopodidae, the genus Paraxenoacria stands out distinctly due to its unique wing morphology as well as the genitalia features of male. Specifically, the hindwings have the costal margin with a shallow inward notch in the middle, flanked by rough projecting scales that give it an excavated appearance. This characteristic is reminiscent of the forewings in the genus Acria, but in Paraxenoacria, this feature is found on the hindwings instead. When at rest, the rough scales of the hindwings protrude outward, a trait not observed in any previously known genera within this family. Therefore, the genus has been so named. The name derives from the Greek word παράξενος, paráxenos, meaning 'bizarre' or 'peculiar' and refers to its peculiar morphology and close resemblance to the genus Acria.

Overall, excavated hindwings, the wing venation, presence of lateral downwardly curved digitiform projections on tegumen (so far neither any Peleopodid genera nor any other in the allied families such as Oecophoridae and Depressariidae bear this feature), the shape of valva and the presence of clavus on it clearly set this genus apart from any of the Peleopodidae genera and allied ones in related families.

== Systematics ==
The genus is tentatively classified within subfamily Acriinae, and contains solely the type species:

- Paraxenoacria spinosa Rayhan & Jahan, 2024

== Description and ecology ==
Paraxenoacria spinosa Rayhan & Jahan, 2024 is described based on males (females yet to describe) and the adults have a wingspan of around 20–21 mm and brownish gray in color. The matured larva is 40 mm in length and are polyphagous since they were observed feeding on at least seven species of unrelated plants including Clerodendrum infortunatum L., Litsea monopetala (Roxb.) Pers., Leea indica (Burm.f.) Merr., Syzygium sp., and Ixora sp. They come out during night time and feed by creating small holes near the cells (in case of mature instars), or making irregular broad scratches on the upper surface of leaves feeding on the upper epidermis (in case of early instars). Pupation takes place within elongated spindle shaped loose silken cocoons in captivity, but within the silken cells in natural habitat.
