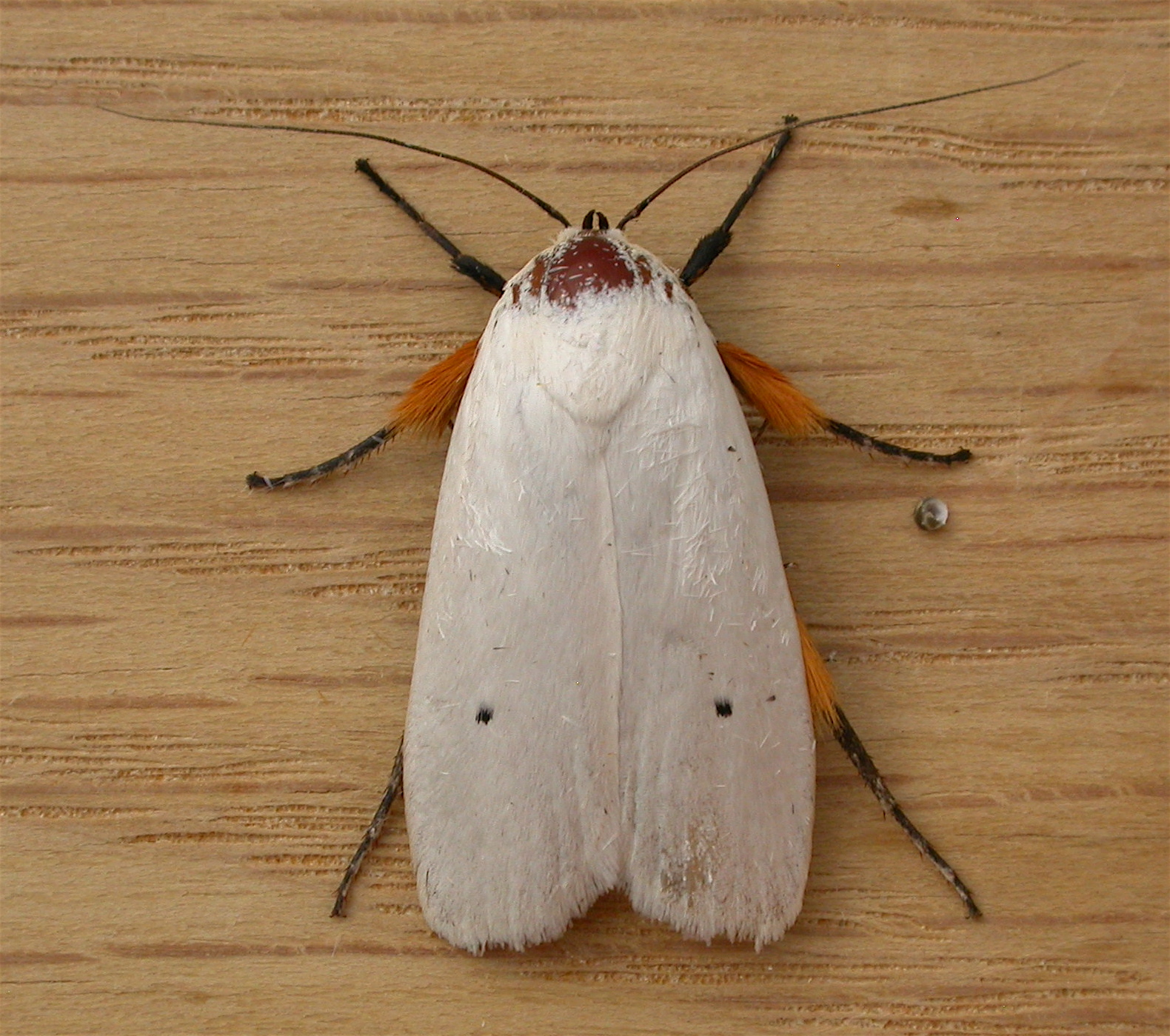

Scientific classification
- Kingdom: Animalia
- Phylum: Arthropoda
- Clade: Pancrustacea
- Class: Insecta
- Order: Lepidoptera
- Family: Xyloryctidae
- Genus: Maroga
- Species: M. melanostigma

Binomial name
- Maroga melanostigma (Wallengren, 1861)

Synonyms
- Cryptophasa melanostigma Wallengren, 1861; Cryptophasa bipunctata Scott, 1864; Maroga gigantella Walker, 1864; Cryptophasa gigantella; Maroga tasmanica Turner, 1927; Tortrix unipunctana Donovan, 1805 (nec. Haworth, 1811)

= Maroga melanostigma =

Species of moth

Maroga melanostigma, the fruit tree borer, is a moth of the family Xyloryctidae. It is native to Australia.

The wingspan is about 40 mm.

The larvae feed on a wide range of trees, including Acacia species, especially Acacia mearnsii. The species is considered a pest on Ulmus × hollandica 'Wredei', Platanus orientalis, various maple species and Rosaceae species such as Malus pumila, Prunus armeniaca, Prunus avium, Prunus persica and Rubus idaeus. Other recorded foodplants include Cassia species, Wisteria sinensis, Carya illinoinensis, Ficus carica, Citrus species, Lantana camara and Vitis vinifera.

== Gallery ==
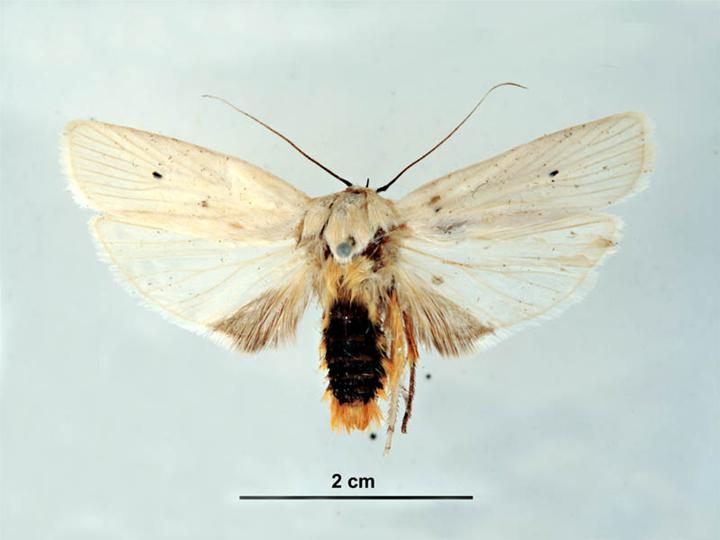
Female, dorsal view

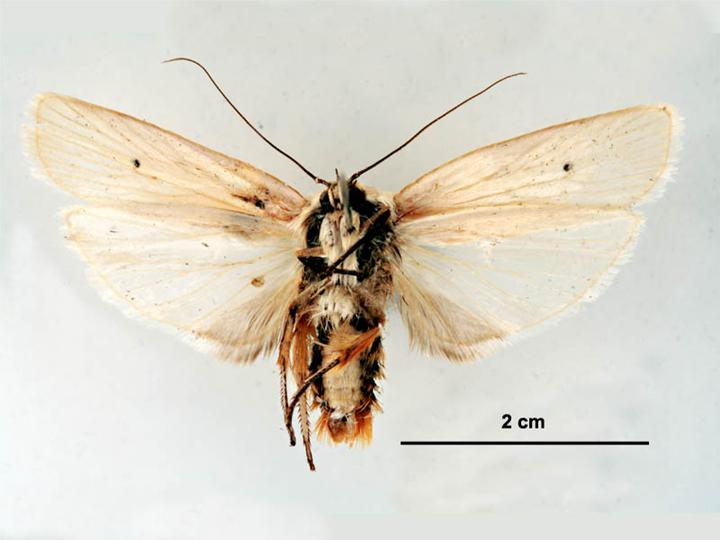
Female, ventral view

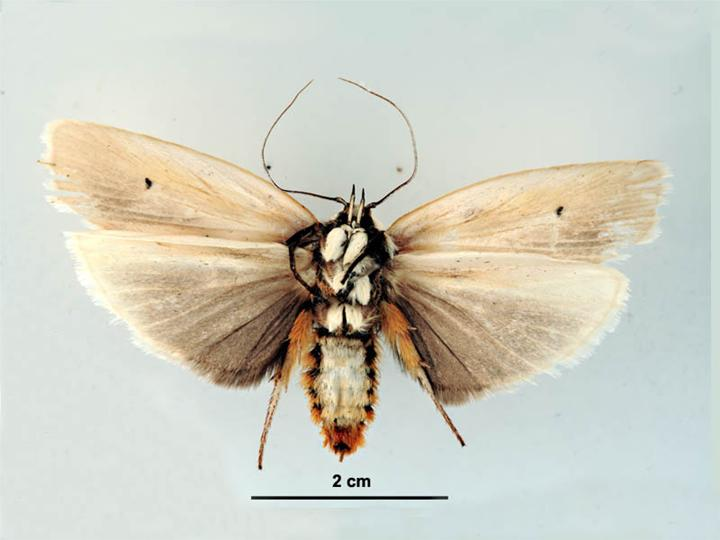
Male, ventral view

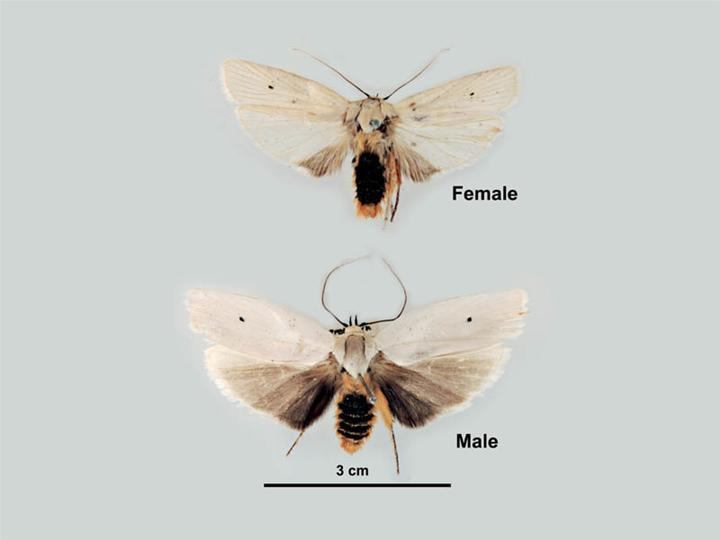
Male and female

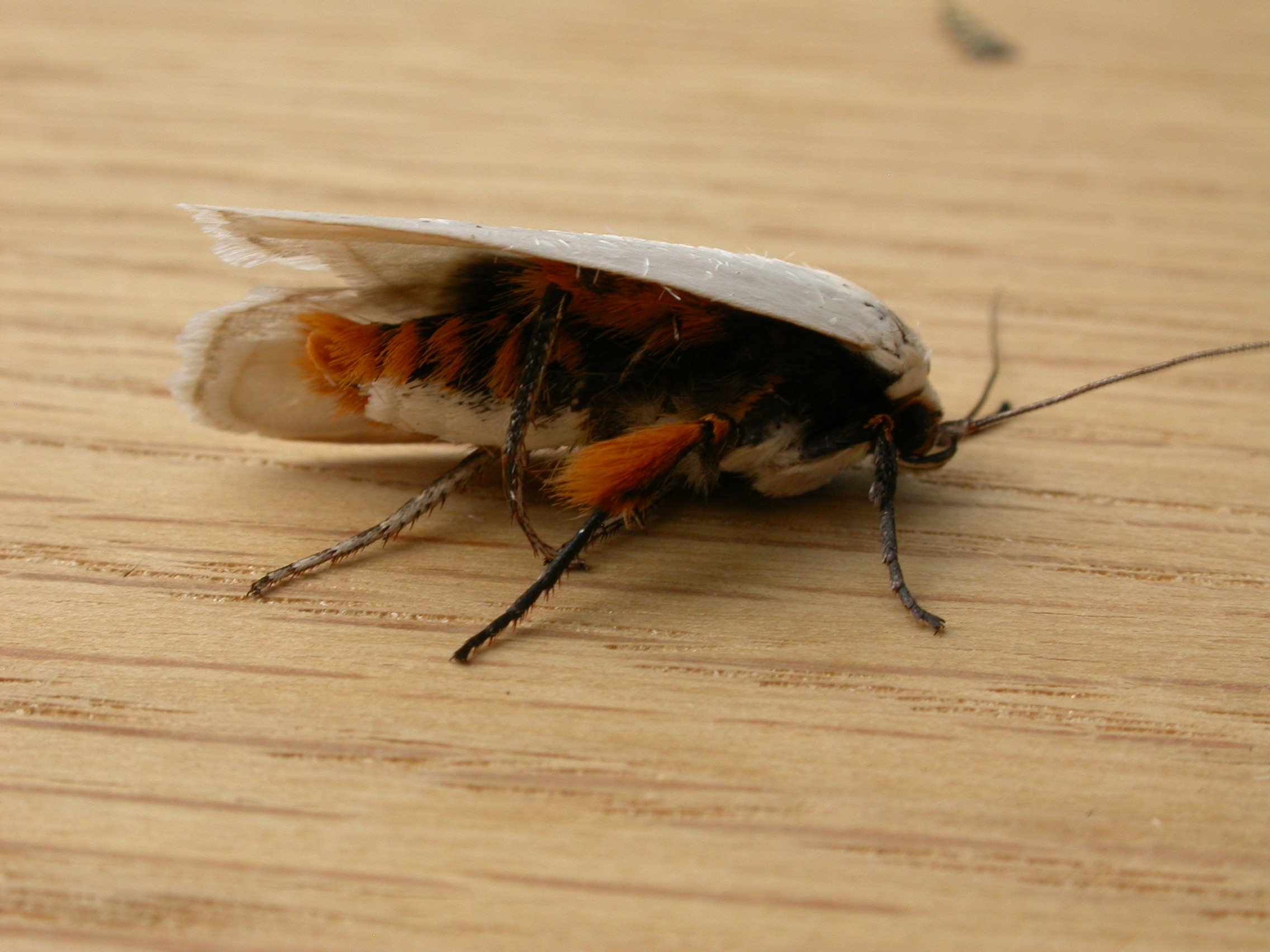
Threatened moths lie down on their back or side
