= Durrantia amabilis =

Scientific classification
- Kingdom: Animalia
- Phylum: Arthropoda
- Clade: Pancrustacea
- Class: Insecta
- Order: Lepidoptera
- Family: Depressariidae
- Genus: Durrantia
- Species: D. amabilis

Binomial name
- Durrantia amabilis Walsingham, 1912

Species of moth

Durrantia amabilis is a species of moth in the family Depressariidae. It was first described by Lord Walsingham in 1912. It is found in Mexico, Guatemala and Venezuela.

The wingspan is about 24 mm. The forewings are pale straw ochreous, a shade of light chestnut brown diffused along the dorsum, attenuate to the tornus and narrowly traceable along the termen and around the apex, above which it is slightly intensified, but becomes evanescent along the costa, recurring towards its base. A small spot of the same brownish colour at the end of the cell, and a few dark fuscous scales very sparsely scattered over the wing surface. The hindwings are shining, pale ivory grey.

The larvae feed on Lantana camara.
