= Durrantia =

Scientific classification
- Domain: Eukaryota
- Kingdom: Animalia
- Phylum: Arthropoda
- Class: Insecta
- Order: Lepidoptera
- Family: Depressariidae
- Subfamily: Peleopodinae
- Genus: Durrantia; Busck, 1908

Synonyms
- Dolidiria Busck, 1912

Genus of moths

Durrantia is a moth genus of the family Depressariidae.

== Species ==
- Durrantia piperatella (Zeller, 1873)
- Durrantia arcanella (Busck, 1912)
- Durrantia amabilis Walsingham, 1912
- Durrantia resurgens Walsingham, 1912
- Durrantia pugnax Walsingham, 1912
- Durrantia flaccescens Meyrick, 1925
