= Pseuderotis =

Scientific classification
- Kingdom: Animalia
- Phylum: Arthropoda
- Class: Insecta
- Order: Lepidoptera
- Family: Depressariidae
- Subfamily: Peleopodinae
- Genus: Pseuderotis; Clarke, 1956

Genus of moths

Pseuderotis is a moth genus of the family Depressariidae.

== Species ==
- Pseuderotis cannescens Clarke, 1956
- Pseuderotis obiterella (Busck, 1908)
- Pseuderotis thamnolopha (Meyrick, 1932)
