= Durrantia piperatella =

Scientific classification
- Kingdom: Animalia
- Phylum: Arthropoda
- Clade: Pancrustacea
- Class: Insecta
- Order: Lepidoptera
- Family: Depressariidae
- Genus: Durrantia
- Species: D. piperatella

Binomial name
- Durrantia piperatella (Zeller, 1873)

Synonyms
- Cryptolechia piperatella Zeller, 1873; Durrantia montivola Meyrick, 1927

Species of moth

Durrantia piperatella is a moth in the family Depressariidae. It was described by Philipp Christoph Zeller in 1873. It is found in North America, where it has been recorded from Arkansas, Louisiana, Mississippi and Texas.

The wingspan is 18–20 mm. The forewings are ochreous white, with two or three grey specks only, sometimes two or three others on the termen, the extreme costal edge yellow ochreous from the base to the origin of the cilia, greyish at the base. The hindwings are pale whitish ochreous.
