= Durrantia pugnax =

Scientific classification
- Domain: Eukaryota
- Kingdom: Animalia
- Phylum: Arthropoda
- Class: Insecta
- Order: Lepidoptera
- Family: Depressariidae
- Genus: Durrantia
- Species: D. pugnax

Binomial name
- Durrantia pugnax Walsingham, 1912

Synonyms
- Durrantia acompsa Walsingham, 1912; Stenoma monotona Amsel, 1956

Species of moth

Durrantia pugnax is a moth in the family Depressariidae. It was described by Lord Walsingham in 1912. It is found in Panama, Guatemala and Venezuela.

The wingspan is about 26 mm. The forewings are pale cream ochreous, sparsely dusted with dark fuscous scales, distributed for the most part singly, but in a small group at the end of the cell, and again in the fold at about half the wing-length, also in about five small terminal spots on the extreme margin. The hindwings are slightly paler than the forewings, and with a shining silky lustre.

The larvae feed on Byrsonima crassifolia.
