= Maroga paragypsa =

Scientific classification
- Kingdom: Animalia
- Phylum: Arthropoda
- Class: Insecta
- Order: Lepidoptera
- Family: Xyloryctidae
- Genus: Maroga
- Species: M. paragypsa

Binomial name
- Maroga paragypsa Lower, 1901

Species of moth

Maroga paragypsa is a moth in the family Xyloryctidae. It was described by Oswald Bertram Lower in 1901. It is found in Australia, where it has been recorded from Western Australia.

The wingspan is about 40 mm. The forewings are creamy white, sparsely irrorated (sprinkled) with some minute blackish scales, which become somewhat ochreous towards the base. The hindwings are creamy white, the basal and inner marginal areas clothed with long yellowish hairs.
