= Durrantia arcanella =

Scientific classification
- Kingdom: Animalia
- Phylum: Arthropoda
- Clade: Pancrustacea
- Class: Insecta
- Order: Lepidoptera
- Family: Depressariidae
- Genus: Durrantia
- Species: D. arcanella

Binomial name
- Durrantia arcanella (Busck, 1912)

Synonyms
- Dolidiria arcanella Busck, 1912

Species of moth

Durrantia arcanella is a moth in the family Depressariidae. It was described by August Busck in 1912. It is found in Mexico, Panama, Guatemala, Honduras and Venezuela.

The wingspan is 13–14 mm. The forewings are ochreous white, with the first and second discal spots deep black, edged with ochreous brown, and with sparse single black scales, scattered irregularly over the wing. The costal edge is golden brown. The hindwings are silvery white with an ochreous sheen.
