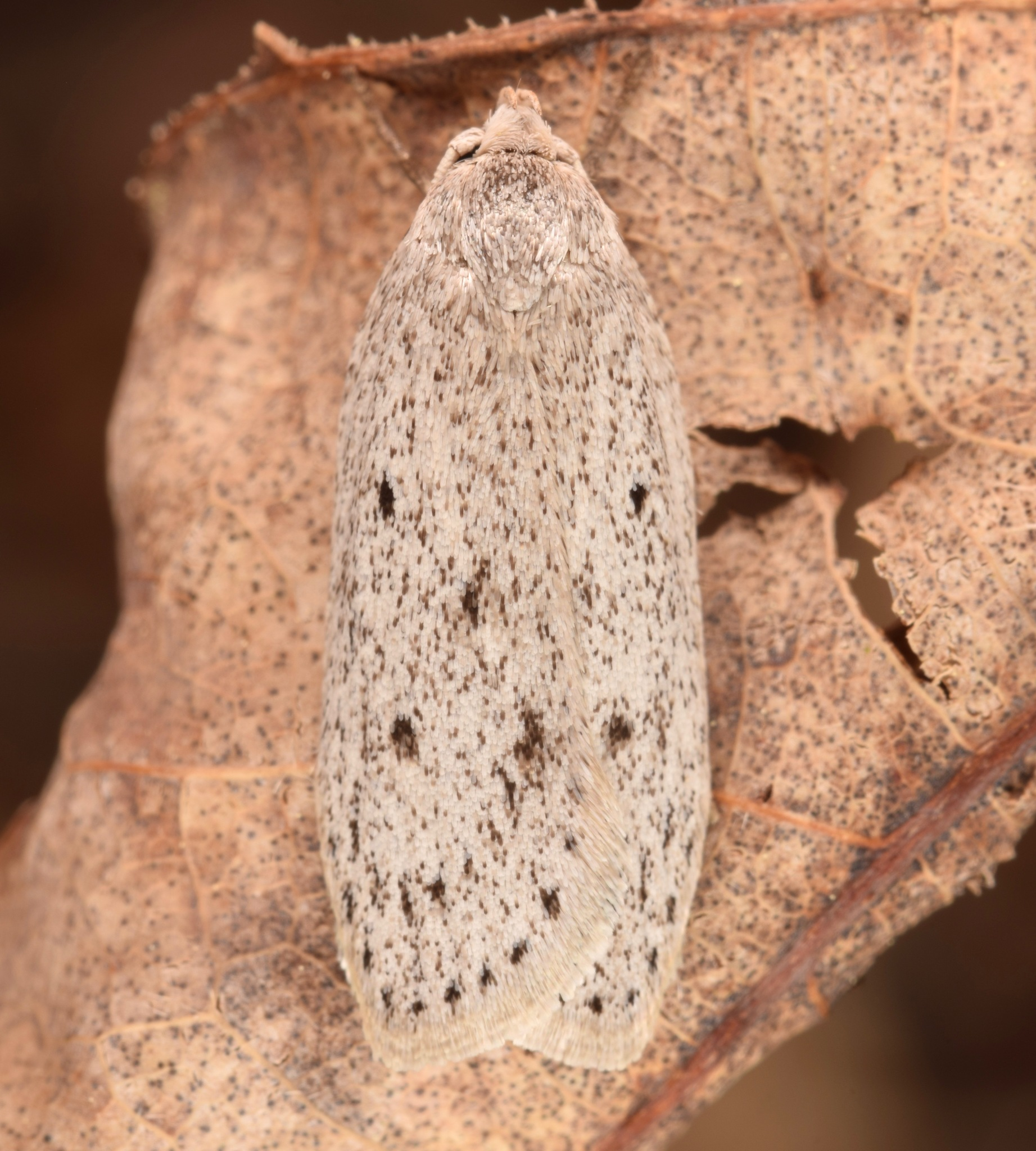

Scientific classification
- Kingdom: Animalia
- Phylum: Arthropoda
- Class: Insecta
- Order: Lepidoptera
- Family: Depressariidae
- Genus: Pseuderotis
- Species: P. obiterella

Binomial name
- Pseuderotis obiterella (Busck, 1908)

Synonyms
- Durrantia obiterella Busck, 1908; Ethmia chambersella Dyar, 1902

= Pseuderotis obiterella =

Species of moth

Pseuderotis obiterella is a moth in the family Depressariidae. It was described by August Busck in 1908. It is found in North America, where it has been recorded from Florida, Georgia, Mississippi, North Carolina, South Carolina and West Virginia.

The wingspan is 20-26 mm. The forewings are white, dusted with brown scales, which form a dot in the cell, one at end of the cell and a large one halfway between these on the submedian fold. There is an indistinct submarginal powdering and terminal row of small dots.
