= Pseuderotis cannescens =

Scientific classification
- Kingdom: Animalia
- Phylum: Arthropoda
- Class: Insecta
- Order: Lepidoptera
- Family: Depressariidae
- Genus: Pseuderotis
- Species: P. cannescens

Binomial name
- Pseuderotis cannescens Clarke, 1956

Species of moth

Pseuderotis cannescens is a moth in the family Depressariidae. It was described by Clarke in 1956. It is found in Argentina and Brazil (Santa Catarina).

The larvae feed on Pologonum persicarioides and Platanus orientalis.
