= Lantadene =

Lantadene A
Lantadene A
Lantadene B
Lantadene C
Lantadene D

Names
- IUPAC names A: (4R,4aS,6aR,6aS,6bR,8aR,12aR,14bS)-2,2,6a,6b,9,9,12a-heptamethyl-4-[(Z)-2-methylbut-2-enoyl]oxy-10-oxo-3,4,5,6,6a,7,8,8a,11,12,13,14b-dodecahydro-1H-picene-4a-carboxylic acid B: (4R,4aS,6aS,6bR,8aR,12aR,12bR,14bS)-2,2,6a,6b,9,9,12a-heptamethyl-4-((3-methylbut-2-enoyl)oxy)-10-oxo-1,3,4,5,6,6a,6b,7,8,8a,9,10,11,12,12a,12b,13,14b-octadecahydropicene-4a(2H)-carboxylic acid
- Other names A: Rehmannic acid

Identifiers
CAS Number	A: 467-81-2; B: 467-82-3; C: 88034-27-9; D: 132194-33-3
3D model (JSmol)	A: Interactive image; B: Interactive image; C: Interactive image; D: Interactive image
ChEMBL	A: ChEMBL510691; B: ChEMBL2413418; D: ChEMBL507802
ChemSpider	A: 4941225; B: 20141716
PubChem CID	A: 6436598; B: 15560077; C: 137381; D: 15143722
UNII	A: 9SK62WCU1W; B: A54682CY7G
CompTox Dashboard (EPA)	DTXSID401139272; B: DTXSID60196913; C: DTXSID201007916
- InChI: A: InChI=1S/C35H52O5/c1-10-21(2)28(37)40-27-20-30(3,4)19-23-22-11-12-25-32(7)15-14-26(36)31(5,6)24(32)13-16-34(25,9)33(22,8)17-18-35(23,27)29(38)39/h10-11,23-25,27H,12-20H2,1-9H3,(H,38,39)/b21-10-/t23-,24-,25+,27+,32-,33+,34+,35-/m0/s1 Key: KCLIRHUTOPOHKJ-LSZVMECJSA-N; B: InChI=1S/C35H52O5/c1-21(2)18-28(37)40-27-20-30(3,4)19-23-22-10-11-25-32(7)14-13-26(36)31(5,6)24(32)12-15-34(25,9)33(22,8)16-17-35(23,27)29(38)39/h10,18,23-25,27H,11-17,19-20H2,1-9H3,(H,38,39)/t23-,24-,25+,27+,32-,33+,34+,35-/m0/s1 Key: VYPAPFHUHDWCBI-QQAPFUPGSA-N; C: InChI=1S/C35H54O5/c1-10-21(2)28(37)40-27-20-30(3,4)19-23-22-11-12-25-32(7)15-14-26(36)31(5,6)24(32)13-16-34(25,9)33(22,8)17-18-35(23,27)29(38)39/h11,21,23-25,27H,10,12-20H2,1-9H3,(H,38,39)/t21-,23+,24?,25+,27+,32-,33+,34+,35-/m0/s1 Key: KVXZSWTXYDUXID-IXQBYEQGSA-N; D: InChI=1S/C34H52O5/c1-20(2)27(36)39-26-19-29(3,4)18-22-21-10-11-24-31(7)14-13-25(35)30(5,6)23(31)12-15-33(24,9)32(21,8)16-17-34(22,26)28(37)38/h10,20,22-24,26H,11-19H2,1-9H3,(H,37,38)/t22-,23-,24+,26+,31-,32+,33+,34-/m0/s1 Key: JJOWBVSGDGLUKQ-SBFMVFAKSA-N
- SMILES: A: C/C=C(/C)\C(=O)O[C@@H]1CC(C[C@@H]2[C@]1(CC[C@@]3(C2=CC[C@H]4[C@]3(CC[C@@H]5[C@@]4(CCC(=O)C5(C)C)C)C)C)C(=O)O)(C)C; B: CC(=CC(=O)O[C@@H]1CC(C[C@@H]2[C@]1(CC[C@@]3(C2=CC[C@H]4[C@]3(CC[C@@H]5[C@@]4(CCC(=O)C5(C)C)C)C)C)C(=O)O)(C)C)C; C: CC[C@H](C)C(=O)O[C@@H]1CC(C[C@H]2[C@]1(CC[C@@]3(C2=CC[C@H]4[C@]3(CCC5[C@@]4(CCC(=O)C5(C)C)C)C)C)C(=O)O)(C)C; D: CC(C)C(=O)O[C@@H]1CC(C[C@@H]2[C@]1(CC[C@@]3(C2=CC[C@H]4[C@]3(CC[C@@H]5[C@@]4(CCC(=O)C5(C)C)C)C)C)C(=O)O)(C)C

Properties
Chemical formula	A and B: C_{35}H_{52}O_{5} C and D: C_{35}H_{54}O_{5}
Molar mass	A and B: 552.80 g/mol C and D: 554.80 g/mol
Melting point	A: 297 °C; B: 302 ˚C

Hazards
- Occupational safety and health (OHS/OSH)
Main hazards	Toxic
- Except where otherwise noted, data are given for materials in their standard state (at 25 °C [77 °F], 100 kPa). Infobox references

Lantadenes are naturally occurring pentacyclic triterpenoids found in the Lantana camara plant. They are known to be poisonous to livestock that graze on the leaves of the plant, causing photosensitivity and hepatotoxicity as major symptoms. Lantadenes A and B are the most abundant and bioactive triterpenoids found in the Lantana camara leaves.

== Discovery ==
In 1922, Kishori Lal Moudgill, a research student from the University of Glasgow, purified the essential oils of the Lantana camara leaves through distillation, isolating 10-12% of α-phellandrene and 80% of an unidentifiable terpene compound. In a series of reports investigating the toxicity of many natural products, Van der Walt and Steyn published in 1941 the effects of Lantana camara poisoning in sheep. They fed two sheep varying amounts of leaves and fresh shoots from a plant native to Durban and found that the sheep became jaundiced and had an inflammation of the nose that created a lasting pink discoloration, called "pink-nose," a condition that commonly appears in other Lantana camara livestock poisonings.

In 1943, Louw isolated the active compound from the leaves through a series of alcohol extractions and recrystallizations, naming it "lantanin." A series of tests were performed to examine the solubility of the active compound in various solvents, determine chemical formula, and probe the functional groups present. 5 years later, in 1948 Louw renamed the substance from "lantanin" to "lantadene A" in order to avoid confusion with a previously named alkaloid from the Lantana brasiliensis plant. In that same study, another structural analog of lantadene A was recrystallized out from a larger sample of Lantana camara leaves, which was named as "lantadene B." The chemical structures of these compounds were accurately determined by Nobel Prize laureate Sir Derek Barton. In 1954, he and co-workers published the correct structure for lantadene B, followed by lantadene A shortly after in 1958.

== Health effects ==
=== Symptoms ===
The lantadenes are particularly well known for their toxicity to livestock, primarily for causing hepatotoxicity, or damage to the liver. A vast collection of symptoms have been observed in cattle, sheep, and other livestock including "weakness, severe gastroenteritis, anorexia, weight loss, jaundice, conjunctivitis, corneal opacity and blindness, ulceration of tongue, gums, and buccal mucous membranes, partial paralysis of the legs, and photosensitization of the skin." Within the first 12-24 after the poisoning, animals exhibit loss of appetite and constipation, followed by more severe effects of photosensitization and jaundice. Unlike the livestock poisonings, cases of poisonings in children do not exhibit jaundice as a major symptom, but rather show symptoms of lung and kidney congestion, diarrhea, vomiting, lack of coordination, and in extreme cases, death.

=== Toxicity ===
Toxicity of the lantadene triterpenoids in adult humans is not well-known, but there have been cases of acute toxicity in children that eat the fruit of the Lantana camara plant. Isolated samples of Lantadenes A and B have been shown to elicit both toxic biological responses as well as potential antimicrobial, antiviral, and antitumor activity in animals, primarily Lantadene A. The LD_{50} values of Lantadene A for toxicity in sheep have been previously reported both intravenously and orally:

Lantadene A: LD_{50}
Animal	Route	LD_{50} (mg/kg)
Sheep	Intravenous	1-3
Sheep	Oral	60

In guinea pigs, a range of effects in the kidney and liver have been reported to be dependent on the amount and duration of lantadenes administered. Dosages of 24 mg/kg (body weight) initiate adverse physiological responses (increased bile duct proliferation and inflammation in the liver) over the course of 90 days of exposure.

=== Mechanism of action ===
The exact mechanism of action of the lantadenes is not well understood. They are thought to inhibit the function of the sodium-potassium pump within the cell membranes of "biliary epithelial cells" within the liver, a process that affects the production and control of bile. Specifically, Lantadene A has been reported to block the "secretion of sheep bile acids" into the bile ducts through an unknown mechanism.

== Chemistry ==
=== Biosynthesis ===
Pentacyclic triterpenoids are believed to be synthesized in nature through cyclization of squalene and its derivatives by the enzymes known as oxidosqualene cyclases (OCS). The exact biosynthetic pathways of the lantadenes are not reported, but 2,3-oxidosqualene (epoxidized derivative of squalene) has been shown to readily cyclize by OSC and undergo oxidation by various enzymes to create common triterpenoid natural products.

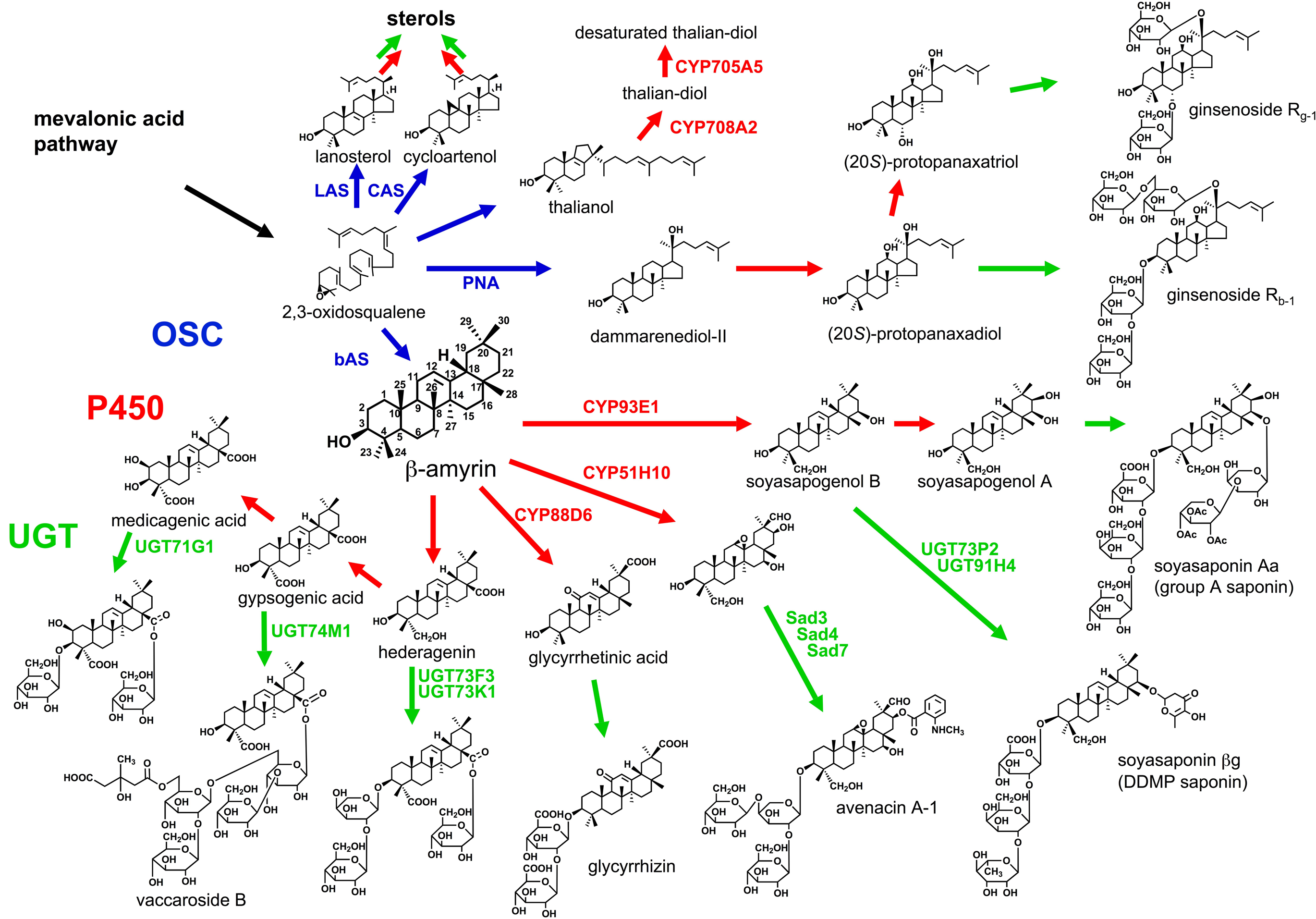
Biosynthesis of triterpenoids

=== Lantadene family ===
There are 4 naturally occurring compounds in the lantadene family, labelled A-D in the order of discovery. They vary in the structure of the carbon-based side chain of the ester group. Lantadenes A and C have the same carbon backbones, where the only difference is the presence of a double bond in the side chain of lantadene A. Lantadenes B and D are similarly related with a different arrangement of methyl substituents in the side chain. Lantadene A and B are the most abundant triterpenoids found in both young and mature Lantana camara leaves, followed by lantadene C.

Lantadenes A-D chemical structures
