= Durrantia resurgens =

Scientific classification
- Kingdom: Animalia
- Phylum: Arthropoda
- Clade: Pancrustacea
- Class: Insecta
- Order: Lepidoptera
- Family: Depressariidae
- Genus: Durrantia
- Species: D. resurgens

Binomial name
- Durrantia resurgens Walsingham, 1912

Species of moth

Durrantia resurgens is a moth in the family Depressariidae. It was described by Lord Walsingham in 1912. It is found in Mexico and Guatemala.

The wingspan is about 22 mm. The forewings are pale straw ochreous, sparsely peppered with dark brown scales beneath the costa and beyond the cell. A small dark brown spot on the middle of the cell and another at its outer end, with a marginal series of elongate spots around the apex and termen. The hindwings are pale straw grey.
