= Pseuderotis thamnolopha =

Scientific classification
- Kingdom: Animalia
- Phylum: Arthropoda
- Class: Insecta
- Order: Lepidoptera
- Family: Depressariidae
- Genus: Pseuderotis
- Species: P. thamnolopha

Binomial name
- Pseuderotis thamnolopha (Meyrick, 1932)

Synonyms
- Asapharcha thamnolopha Meyrick, 1932

Species of moth

Pseuderotis thamnolopha is a moth in the family Depressariidae. It was described by Edward Meyrick in 1932. It is found in Costa Rica and Guatemala.
