= Maroga sericodes =

Scientific classification
- Kingdom: Animalia
- Phylum: Arthropoda
- Class: Insecta
- Order: Lepidoptera
- Family: Xyloryctidae
- Genus: Maroga
- Species: M. sericodes

Binomial name
- Maroga sericodes Meyrick, 1915

Species of moth

Maroga sericodes is a moth in the family Xyloryctidae. It was described by Edward Meyrick in 1915. It is found in Australia, where it has been recorded from Queensland.

The wingspan is about 58 mm. The forewings are shining whitish grey, whitish towards the costa, especially anteriorly. The hindwings are grey, darker towards the tornus.

The larvae have been recorded feeding on Calliandra calothyrsus. They bore in the stem of their host plant.
