= Maroga leptopasta =

Scientific classification
- Domain: Eukaryota
- Kingdom: Animalia
- Phylum: Arthropoda
- Class: Insecta
- Order: Lepidoptera
- Family: Xyloryctidae
- Genus: Maroga
- Species: M. leptopasta

Binomial name
- Maroga leptopasta Turner, 1917

Species of moth

Maroga leptopasta is a moth in the family Xyloryctidae. It was described by Alfred Jefferis Turner in 1917. It is found in Australia, where it has been recorded from the Northern Territory.

The wingspan is 46–50 mm. The forewings are grey-whitish very sparsely irrorated with large single black scales and sometimes with a black discal dot at two-thirds. The hindwings are whitish.
