= Durrantia flaccescens =

Scientific classification
- Kingdom: Animalia
- Phylum: Arthropoda
- Class: Insecta
- Order: Lepidoptera
- Family: Depressariidae
- Genus: Durrantia
- Species: D. flaccescens

Binomial name
- Durrantia flaccescens Meyrick, 1925

Species of moth

Durrantia flaccescens is a moth in the family Depressariidae. It was described by Edward Meyrick in 1925. It is found in Peru and Venezuela.

The wingspan is about 17 mm. The forewings are pale whitish ochreous with the second discal stigma faint, suffused and ochreous. The hindwings are pale whitish ochreous.
