= Peleopodinae =

Scientific classification
- Kingdom: Animalia
- Phylum: Arthropoda
- Clade: Pancrustacea
- Class: Insecta
- Order: Lepidoptera
- Family: Depressariidae
- Subfamily: Peleopodinae; Hodges, 1974

Synonyms
- Peleopodidae; Carcinidae Meyrick, 1906; Carcinides Meyrick, 1906; Peleopodini

Subfamily of moths

Peleopodinae is a subfamily of small moths in the family Depressariidae.

== Taxonomy and systematics ==
- Antoloea Meyrick, 1914
- Carcina Hübner, [1825]
- Durrantia Busck, 1908
- Peleopoda Zeller, 1877
- Pseuderotis Clarke, 1956
