= Maroga setiotricha =

Scientific classification
- Kingdom: Animalia
- Phylum: Arthropoda
- Class: Insecta
- Order: Lepidoptera
- Family: Xyloryctidae
- Genus: Maroga
- Species: M. setiotricha

Binomial name
- Maroga setiotricha Meyrick, 1890

Species of moth

Maroga setiotricha is a moth in the family Xyloryctidae. It was described by Edward Meyrick in 1890. It is found in Australia, more specifically in Northern Territory, Queensland and Western Australia, where it has been recorded.

The wingspan is 56–66 mm. The forewings are grey whitish, strewn with numerous long fine linear blackish scales. It presents a blackish dot in the disc at two-thirds. The hindwings are iridescent whitish in males. The hindwings of the females are fuscous, darker towards the base and with a paler apex.

The larvae feed on Acacia species. They bore in the stem of their host plant.
