= Maroga =

Scientific classification
- Kingdom: Animalia
- Phylum: Arthropoda
- Clade: Pancrustacea
- Class: Insecta
- Order: Lepidoptera
- Family: Xyloryctidae
- Genus: Maroga; Walker, 1864

Genus of moths

Maroga is a genus of moths of the family Xyloryctidae.

== Species ==
- Maroga leptopasta Turner, 1917
- Maroga melanostigma (Wallengren, 1861)
- Maroga paragypsa Lower, 1901
- Maroga sericodes Meyrick, 1915
- Maroga setiotricha Meyrick, 1890
