= Antoloea =

Scientific classification
- Kingdom: Animalia
- Phylum: Arthropoda
- Clade: Pancrustacea
- Class: Insecta
- Order: Lepidoptera
- Family: Depressariidae
- Genus: Antoloea; Meyrick, 1914
- Species: A. xanthopa

Binomial name
- Antoloea xanthopa Meyrick, 1914

Genus of moths

Antoloea is a monotypic moth genus in the family Depressariidae. Its only species, Antoloea xanthopa, is found in Assam, India. Both the genus and species were first described by Edward Meyrick in 1914.

The wingspan is 13–14 mm. The forewings are white with a large undefined blotch of ochreous-orange suffusion occupying the lower part of the disc posteriorly, with some scattered black specks within and above it, and including a tuft of scales mixed with black representing the second discal stigma, and a small spot or group of black scales towards the dorsum. There is a large black dot in the disc towards the termen, and a few black specks above and below this. The hindwings are white, faintly tinged with yellowish.
