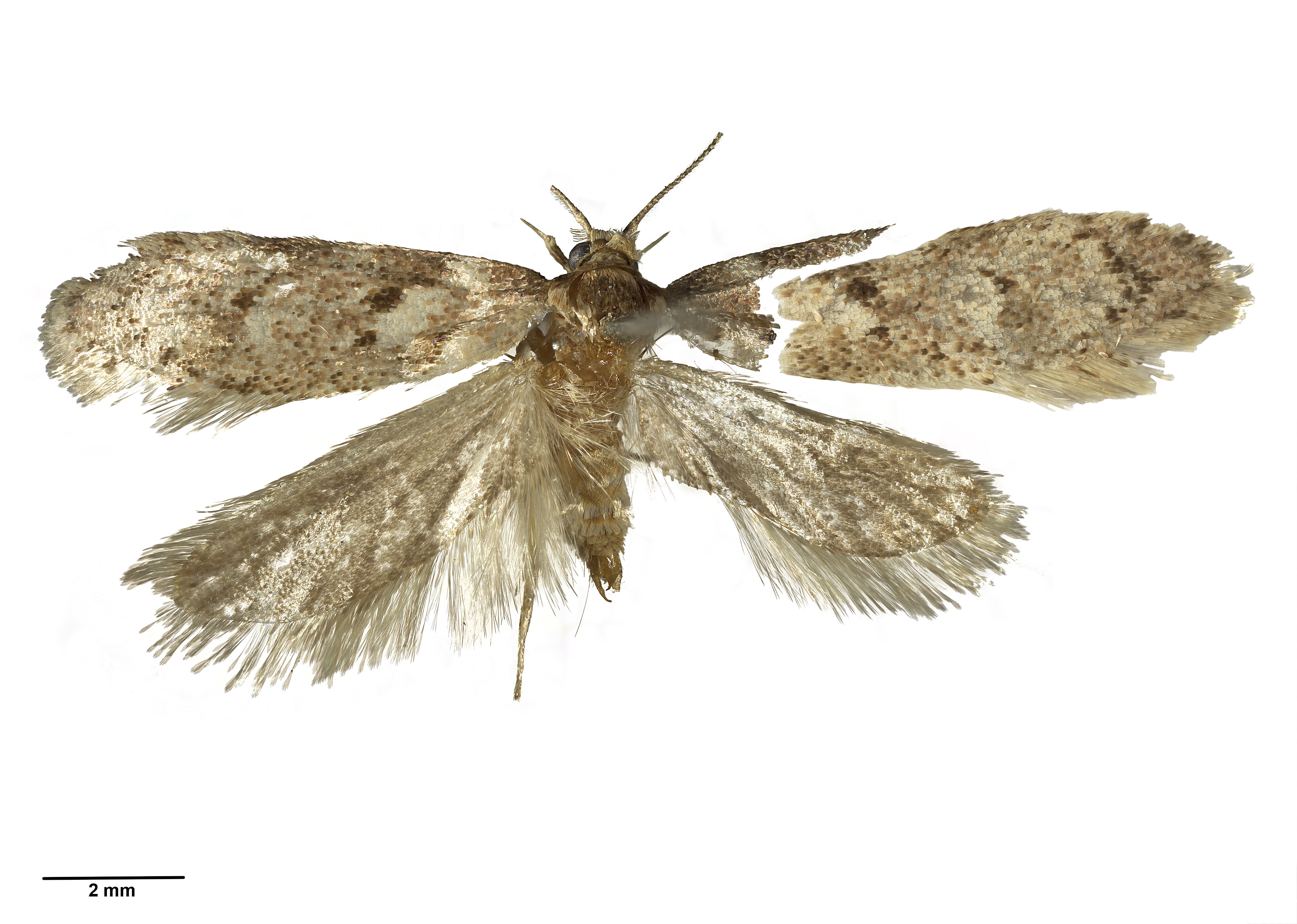
- Male holotype specimen held at the Auckland War Memorial Museum.

Scientific classification
- Kingdom: Animalia
- Phylum: Arthropoda
- Clade: Pancrustacea
- Class: Insecta
- Order: Lepidoptera
- Superfamily: Gelechioidea
- Family: Oecophoridae
- Genus: Leptocroca
- Species: L. lenita

Binomial name
- Leptocroca lenita Philpott, 1931

= Leptocroca lenita =

Species of moth endemic to New Zealand

Leptocroca lenita is a moth of the family Oecophoridae. However the classification of this moth within the genus Leptocroca is regarded as being unsatisfactory and in need of revision. L. lenita was first described by Alfred Philpott in 1931. It is endemic to New Zealand and has been observed in the Nelson and West Coast regions. Adults have been observed on the wing from December until February.

== Taxonomy ==
This species was first described by Alfred Philpott in 1931 using a specimen collected by George Hudson at Newton Flat in the Buller Gorge in December. Hudson discussed and illustrated this species in his 1939 book A supplement to the butterflies and moths of New Zealand. This species is regarded as being taxonomically unresolved as it likely belongs to another genus. It is therefore also known as Leptocroca (s.l.) lenita. The male holotype is held at the Auckland War Memorial Museum.

== Description ==
Live moth.

Illustration of male.

Philpott described this species as follows:

♂. 18 mm. Head dull ochreous. Palpi ochreous, second segment fuscous externally except at apex. Antennae ochreous mixed with fuscous, ciliations in ♂ ¾. Thorax pale and dark brown mixed. Abdomen ochreous, middle of segments brassy. Legs ochreous, anterior pair fuscous. Forewings elongate, costa moderately arched, apex broadly rounded, termen rounded, oblique; ochreous white, densely irrorated with pale brown; markings obscurely formed by aggregations of brown scales; an irregular fascia from costa at base to dorsum at ⅓, enclosing a blackish brown spot below fold; a broad fascia from costa at ¼ to before tornus, enclosing rather large blackish brown 1st discal spot; plical spot small, blackish brown, obliquely beyond 1st discal; a very obscure fascia, indicated by patch on costa at ⅗, enclosing 2nd discal; an interrupted curved subterminal fascia: fringes whitish ochreous. Hindwings silvery grey: fringes ochreous.

This species is paler in colour than any other member of the genus except L. lindsayi and differs from that species in male genitalia characteristics.

== Distribution ==
This species is endemic to New Zealand. This species has been observed in the Nelson and West Coast regions.

== Behaviour ==
Adults have been observed on the wing in December to February.
