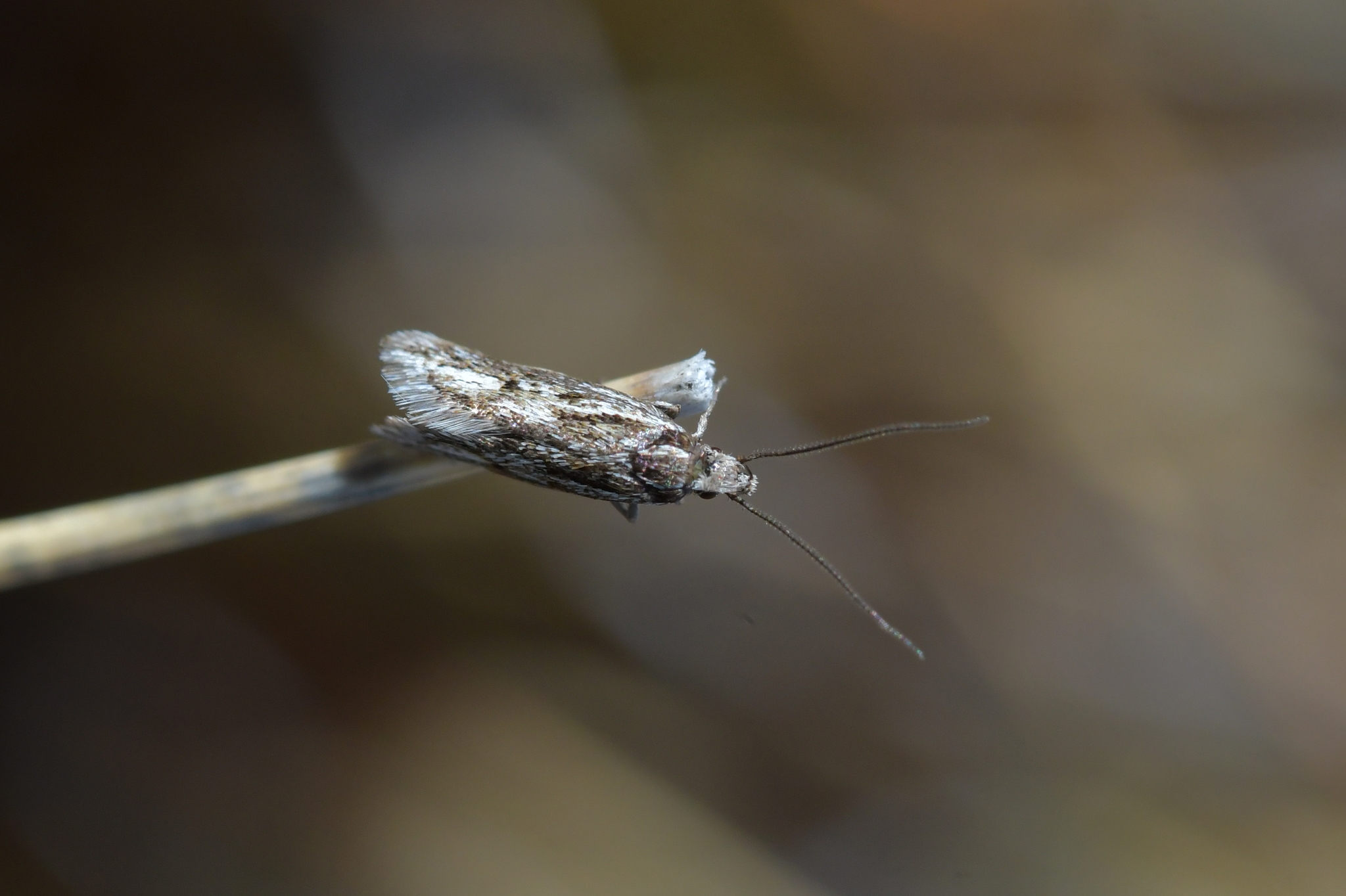

Scientific classification
- Kingdom: Animalia
- Phylum: Arthropoda
- Clade: Pancrustacea
- Class: Insecta
- Order: Lepidoptera
- Superfamily: Gelechioidea
- Family: Oecophoridae
- Genus: Prepalla
- Species: P. austrina

Binomial name
- Prepalla austrina (Meyrick, 1914)

Synonyms
- Saropla austrina Meyrick, 1914; Oxythecta austrina (Meyrick, 1914)

= Prepalla austrina =

Species of moth

Prepalla austrina is a moth of the family Oecophoridae. It was described by Edward Meyrick in 1914 under the name Saropla austrina. Meyrick later moved the species into the genus Oxythecta. However in 1997 its taxonomy was reconsidered by Ian Francis Bell Common and the species was included in the genus Prepalla. It is endemic to New Zealand and is present in Otago. The host plant for this moth is Leucopogon fraseri.
