= Deoclona =

Scientific classification
- Kingdom: Animalia
- Phylum: Arthropoda
- Clade: Pancrustacea
- Class: Insecta
- Order: Lepidoptera
- Family: Autostichidae
- Subfamily: Deocloninae
- Genus: Deoclona; Busck, 1903

Synonyms
- Proclesis Walsingham, 1911; Lioclepta Meyrick, 1922

Genus of moths

Deoclona is a moth genus. It is placed in the family Autostichidae.

== Species ==
- Deoclona complanata (Meyrick, 1922)
- Deoclona eriobotryae (Busck, 1939)
- Deoclona xanthoselene (Walsingham, 1911)
- Deoclona yuccasella Busck, 1903
