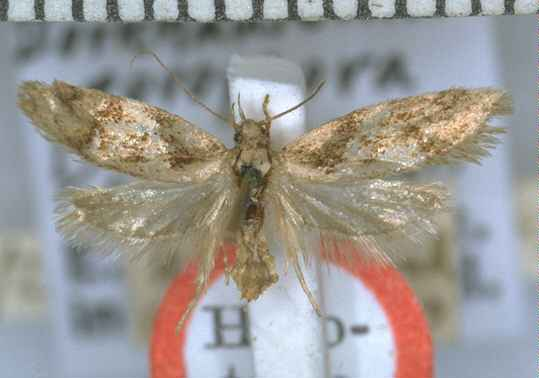
- Female holotype

Scientific classification
- Kingdom: Animalia
- Phylum: Arthropoda
- Class: Insecta
- Order: Lepidoptera
- Superfamily: Gelechioidea
- Family: Oecophoridae
- Genus: Leptocroca
- Species: L. porophora

Binomial name
- Leptocroca porophora ( Meyrick, 1929)

Synonyms
- Borkhausenia porophora Meyrick, 1929

= Leptocroca porophora =

Species of moth endemic to New Zealand

Leptocroca porophora is a moth of the family Oecophoridae first described by Edward Meyrick in 1929. It is endemic to New Zealand. The classification of this moth within the genus Leptocroca is regarded as unsatisfactory and in need of revision. As such this species is currently also known as Leptocroca (s.l.) porophora.
