= Carcina haemographa =

Scientific classification
- Kingdom: Animalia
- Phylum: Arthropoda
- Class: Insecta
- Order: Lepidoptera
- Family: Depressariidae
- Genus: Carcina
- Species: C. haemographa

Binomial name
- Carcina haemographa Meyrick, 1937

Species of moth

Carcina haemographa is a moth in the family Depressariidae. It was described by Edward Meyrick in 1937. It is found in the Democratic Republic of the Congo (West Kasai, Equateur).
