= Deoclona yuccasella =

Scientific classification
- Domain: Eukaryota
- Kingdom: Animalia
- Phylum: Arthropoda
- Class: Insecta
- Order: Lepidoptera
- Family: Autostichidae
- Genus: Deoclona
- Species: D. yuccasella

Binomial name
- Deoclona yuccasella Busck, 1903

Species of moth

Deoclona yuccasella is a moth in the family Autostichidae. It was described by August Busck in 1903. It is found in North America, where it has been recorded from California.

The wingspan is 16.2–20 mm (0.64–0.79 in). The forewings are unicolorous light reddish yellow, without any markings. In some specimens the forewings are slightly darker and more reddish towards the apex than on the basal half. The hindwings are pale silvery yellow.

The larvae feed on Yucca whipplei. They live in the dry seed pods, pupating in holes eaten therein.
