= Deoclona xanthoselene =

Scientific classification
- Domain: Eukaryota
- Kingdom: Animalia
- Phylum: Arthropoda
- Class: Insecta
- Order: Lepidoptera
- Family: Autostichidae
- Genus: Deoclona
- Species: D. xanthoselene

Binomial name
- Deoclona xanthoselene (Walsingham, 1911)

Synonyms
- Proclesis xanthoselene Walsingham, 1911

Species of moth

Deoclona xanthoselene is a moth in the family Autostichidae. It was described by Thomas de Grey, 6th Baron Walsingham, in 1911. It is found in Panama and Guyana.

The wingspan is 18–20 mm. The forewings are brownish ochreous, thickly overlaid with minute steel-blue scales, giving an oily sheen to the wing-surface, especially along the margins. This steel-blue sheen becomes intensified gradually outwards, until it forms, in some lights, a clear steel-blue patch adjacent to the apex and termen, produced outward at the apex and tornus through the cilia and enclosing a semilunate terminal patch of bright yellow-ochreous, covering a small portion of the termen and including all the terminal cilia, except at the angles. A patch of bluish scaling at the end of the cell shows a tendency to divide into two spots, and is preceded by a similar patch at about one-third the length of the cell. The hindwings are shining, coppery yellowish.
