= Ceuthomadarus atlantis =

Scientific classification
- Kingdom: Animalia
- Phylum: Arthropoda
- Clade: Pancrustacea
- Class: Insecta
- Order: Lepidoptera
- Family: Lecithoceridae
- Genus: Ceuthomadarus
- Species: C. atlantis

Binomial name
- Ceuthomadarus atlantis (Gozmány, 1978)

Synonyms
- Ceuthomaradus atlantis Gozmány, 1978

Species of moth found in Morocco

Ceuthomadarus atlantis is a species of moth in the family Lecithoceridae and subfamily Ceuthomadarinae. It is known from Morocco, where its type locality is in the High Atlas Mountains.

== Taxonomy ==
Hungarian entomologist László Anthony Gozmány described the species in 1978 under the original combination Ceuthomaradus atlantis. The description appeared on page 58 of the Lecithoceridae volume of the series Microlepidoptera Palaearctica. It is currently placed in the genus Ceuthomadarus, resulting in the combination Ceuthomadarus atlantis.

The holotype is a female collected at Goundafa in the High Atlas of Morocco. The specimen is deposited in the Natural History Museum, Vienna (NHMW).

== Distribution ==
The species has been recorded from Morocco. Its documented type locality, Goundafa, lies in the High Atlas Mountains. Published information about its habitat, larval food plants and life history remains limited.
