= Carcina luridella =

Scientific classification
- Domain: Eukaryota
- Kingdom: Animalia
- Phylum: Arthropoda
- Class: Insecta
- Order: Lepidoptera
- Family: Depressariidae
- Genus: Carcina
- Species: C. luridella

Binomial name
- Carcina luridella (Christoph, 1882)

Synonyms
- Lecithocera luridella Christoph, 1882; Heterodmeta homomorpha Meyrick, 1931

Species of moth

Carcina luridella is a moth in the family Depressariidae. It was described by Hugo Theodor Christoph in 1882. It is found in the Russian Far East (Amur, Ussuri, Sakhalin, Kunashir) and Japan.
