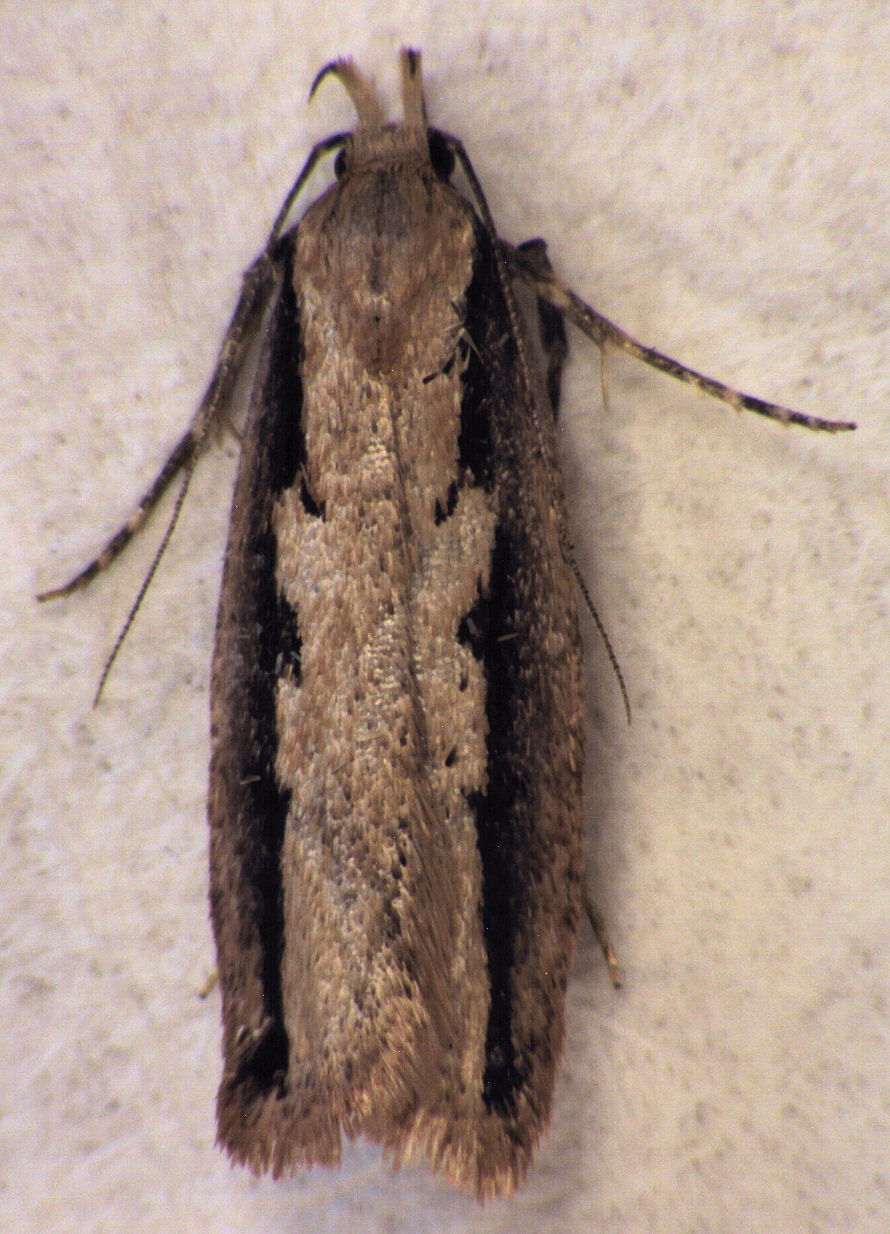

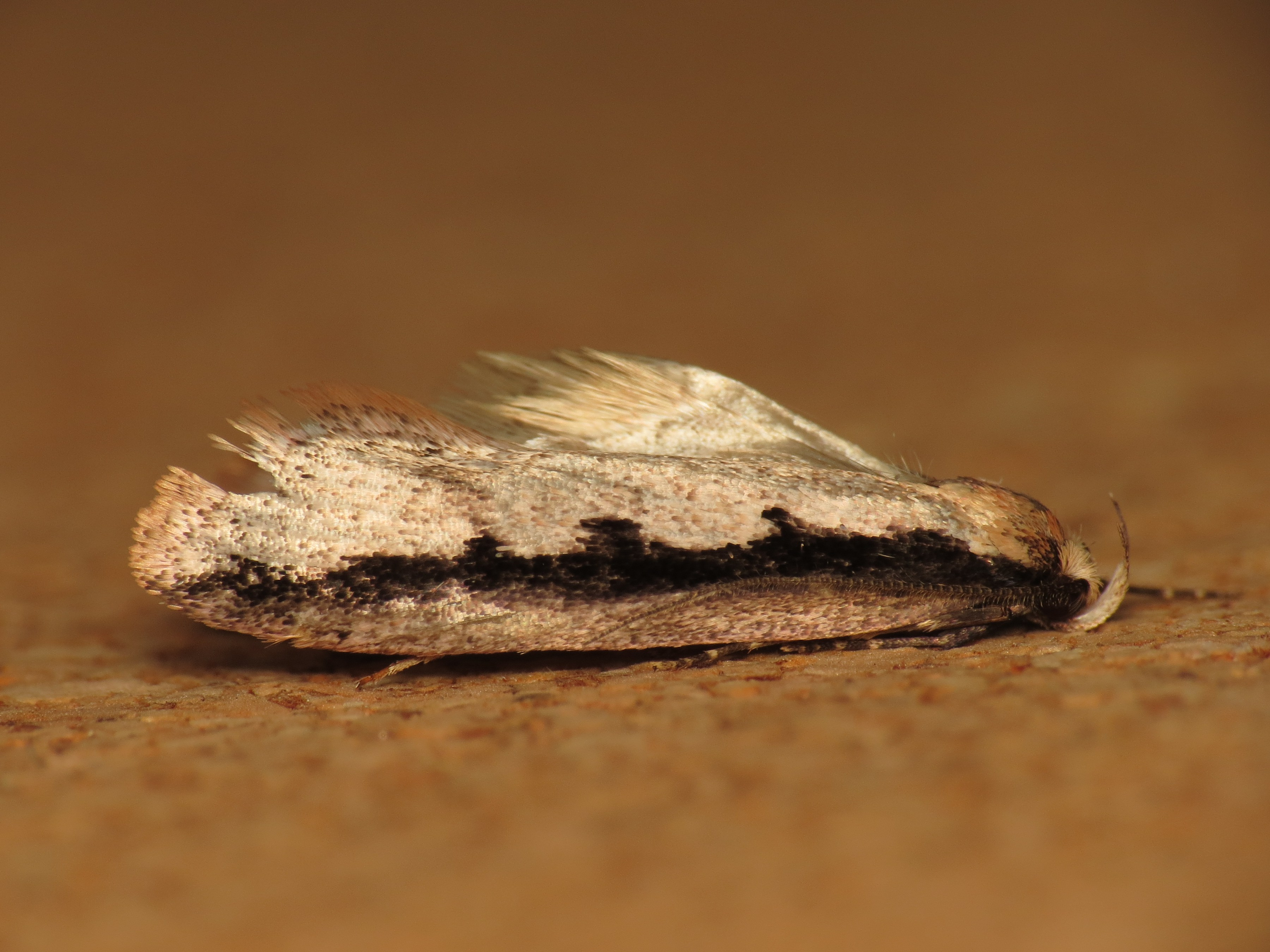

Scientific classification
- Kingdom: Animalia
- Phylum: Arthropoda
- Class: Insecta
- Order: Lepidoptera
- Superfamily: Gelechioidea
- Family: Oecophoridae
- Genus: Leptocroca
- Species: L. sanguinolenta

Binomial name
- Leptocroca sanguinolenta Meyrick, 1886

= Leptocroca sanguinolenta =

Species of moth

Leptocroca sanguinolenta is a moth of the family Oecophoridae. It is found in New South Wales (Australia) and New Zealand.

== Description ==
The wingspan is about 20 mm.
