= Deoclona eriobotryae =

Scientific classification
- Domain: Eukaryota
- Kingdom: Animalia
- Phylum: Arthropoda
- Class: Insecta
- Order: Lepidoptera
- Family: Autostichidae
- Genus: Deoclona
- Species: D. eriobotryae

Binomial name
- Deoclona eriobotryae (Busck, 1939)

Synonyms
- Proclesis eriobotryae Busck, 1939

Species of moth

Deoclona eriobotryae is a moth in the family Autostichidae. It was described by August Busck in 1939. It is found in Argentina.

The larvae have been observed feeding in the fruits of Eriobotrya japonica.
