= Deoclona complanata =

Scientific classification
- Domain: Eukaryota
- Kingdom: Animalia
- Phylum: Arthropoda
- Class: Insecta
- Order: Lepidoptera
- Family: Autostichidae
- Genus: Deoclona
- Species: D. complanata

Binomial name
- Deoclona complanata (Meyrick, 1922)

Synonyms
- Lioclepta complanata Meyrick, 1922

Species of moth

Deoclona complanata is a moth in the family Autostichidae. It was described by Edward Meyrick in 1922. It is found in Peru.

The wingspan is 13–14 mm. The forewings are pale ochreous or whitish ochreous, greyish sprinkled, the costa sometimes yellower posteriorly. The hindwings are whitish yellowish.
