= Elachista parvipulvella =

"Elachista" parvipulvella

Scientific classification
- Kingdom: Animalia
- Phylum: Arthropoda
- Clade: Pancrustacea
- Class: Insecta
- Order: Lepidoptera
- Superfamily: Gelechioidea
- Genus: incertae sedis
- Species: "E." parvipulvella

Binomial name
- "Elachista" parvipulvella Chambers, 1875

Species of moth

"Elachista" parvipulvella is a moth of the superfamily Gelechioidea. It was described from Texas.
