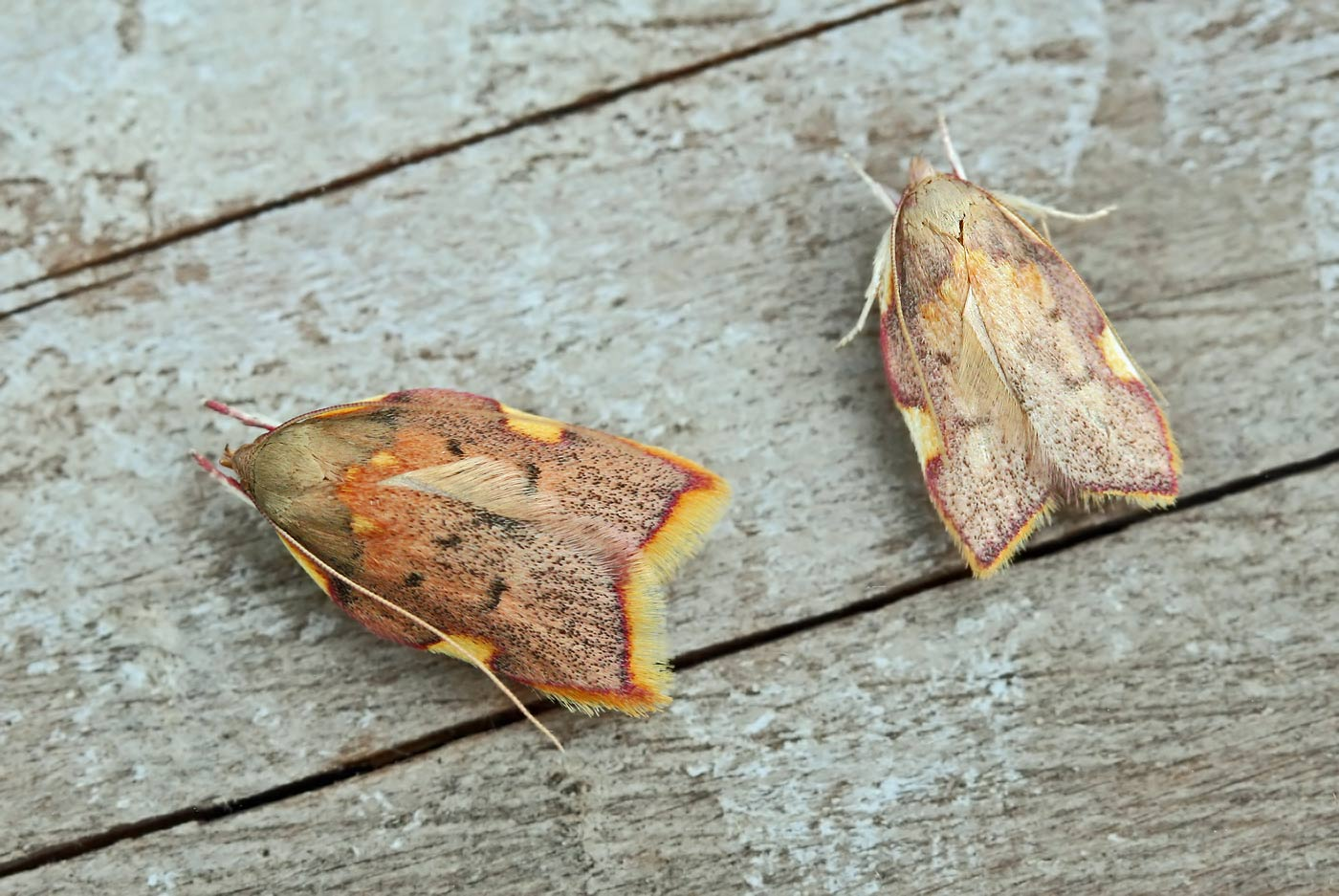

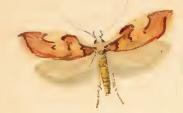

Scientific classification
- Domain: Eukaryota
- Kingdom: Animalia
- Phylum: Arthropoda
- Class: Insecta
- Order: Lepidoptera
- Family: Depressariidae
- Genus: Carcina
- Species: C. quercana

Binomial name
- Carcina quercana (Fabricius, 1775)

Synonyms
- List: Pyralis quercana Fabricius, 1775; Tortrix fagana Denis & Schiffermüller, 1775; Tinea cancella Hübner, [1824]; Lampros faganella Treitschke, 1833; Carcina purpurana Millière, 1874

= Carcina quercana =

Species of moth

Carcina quercana is a species of moth of the family Depressariidae. It is found in Europe. It has been introduced recently in North America, British Columbia and western Washington. It is occasionally known by several common names including oak lantern, long-horned flat-body, and oak-skeletonizer moth (the last most common in North America).

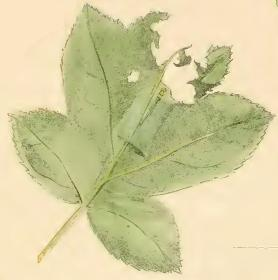
A leaf of Sorbus torminalis with larval web

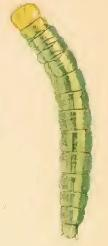
Larva

The wingspan is 16–20 mm. The forewings are light ochreous, more or less purple-tinged, sprinkled with dark fuscous; costal edge purple; a yellow blotch along costa near base, and another beyond middle; a fuscous transverse line at 1/4, followed by a yellowish suffusion towards dorsum; stigmata dark grey, plical usually faint; a terminal purple line; cilia bright yellow except on tornus. Hindwings are yellow-whitish, apex rosy-tinged. The larva is pale green; dorsal line darker, paler -edged; head yellowish-green,

The larvae feed on various deciduous trees, including oak and beech.
