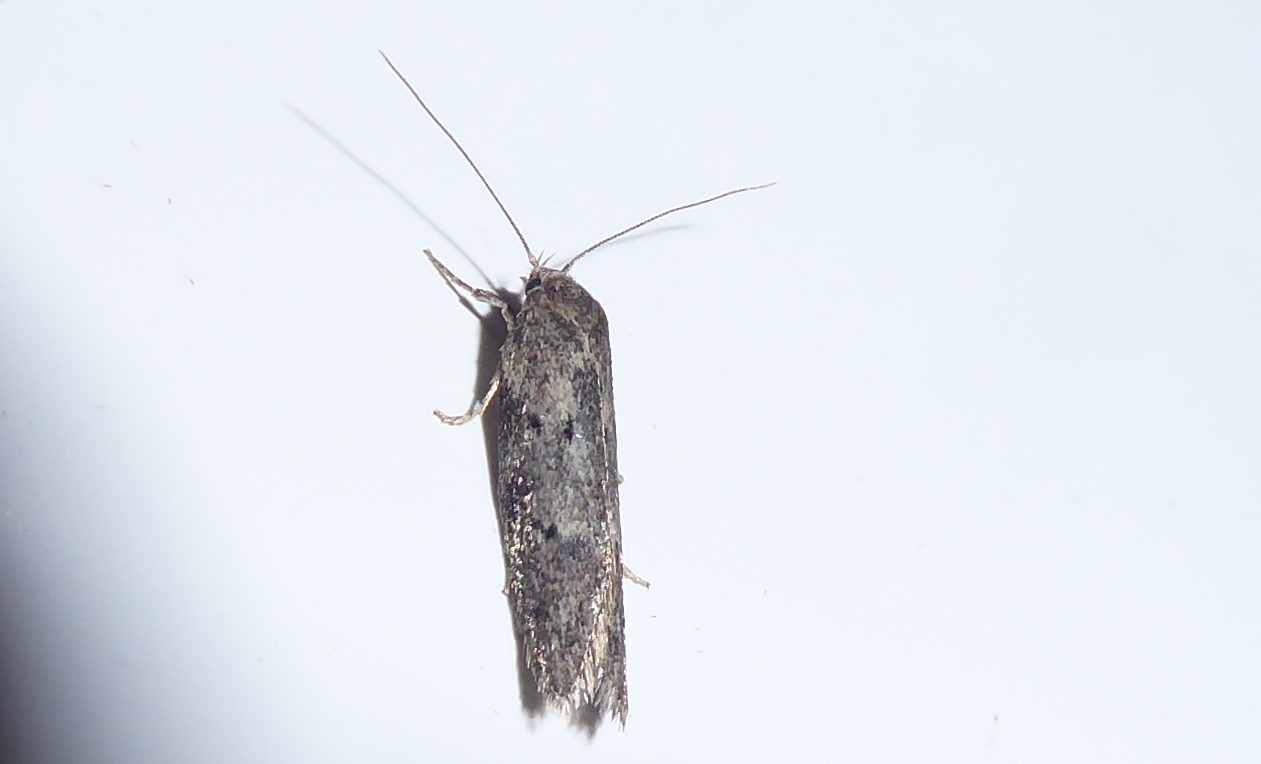

Scientific classification
- Kingdom: Animalia
- Phylum: Arthropoda
- Class: Insecta
- Order: Lepidoptera
- Superfamily: Gelechioidea
- Family: Oecophoridae
- Genus: Leptocroca
- Species: L. asphaltis

Binomial name
- Leptocroca asphaltis ( Meyrick, 1911)

Synonyms
- Oecophora asphaltis Meyrick, 1911; Guestia asphaltis (Meyrick, 1911)

= Leptocroca asphaltis =

Species of moth

Leptocroca asphaltis is a moth of the family Oecophoridae. It was described by Edward Meyrick in 1911. It is endemic to New Zealand.

== Gallery ==
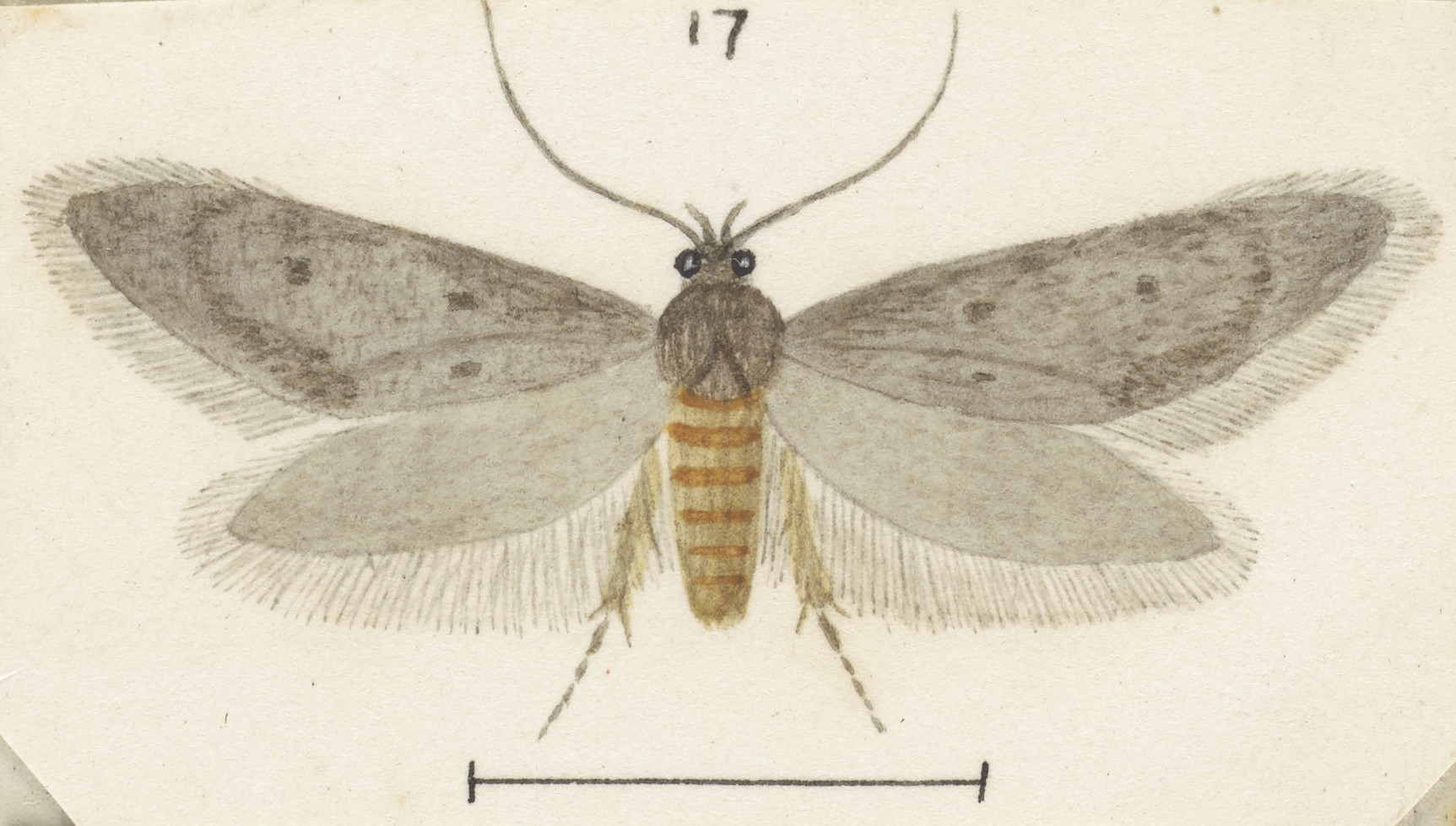
Watercolour by George Hudson, c. 1927

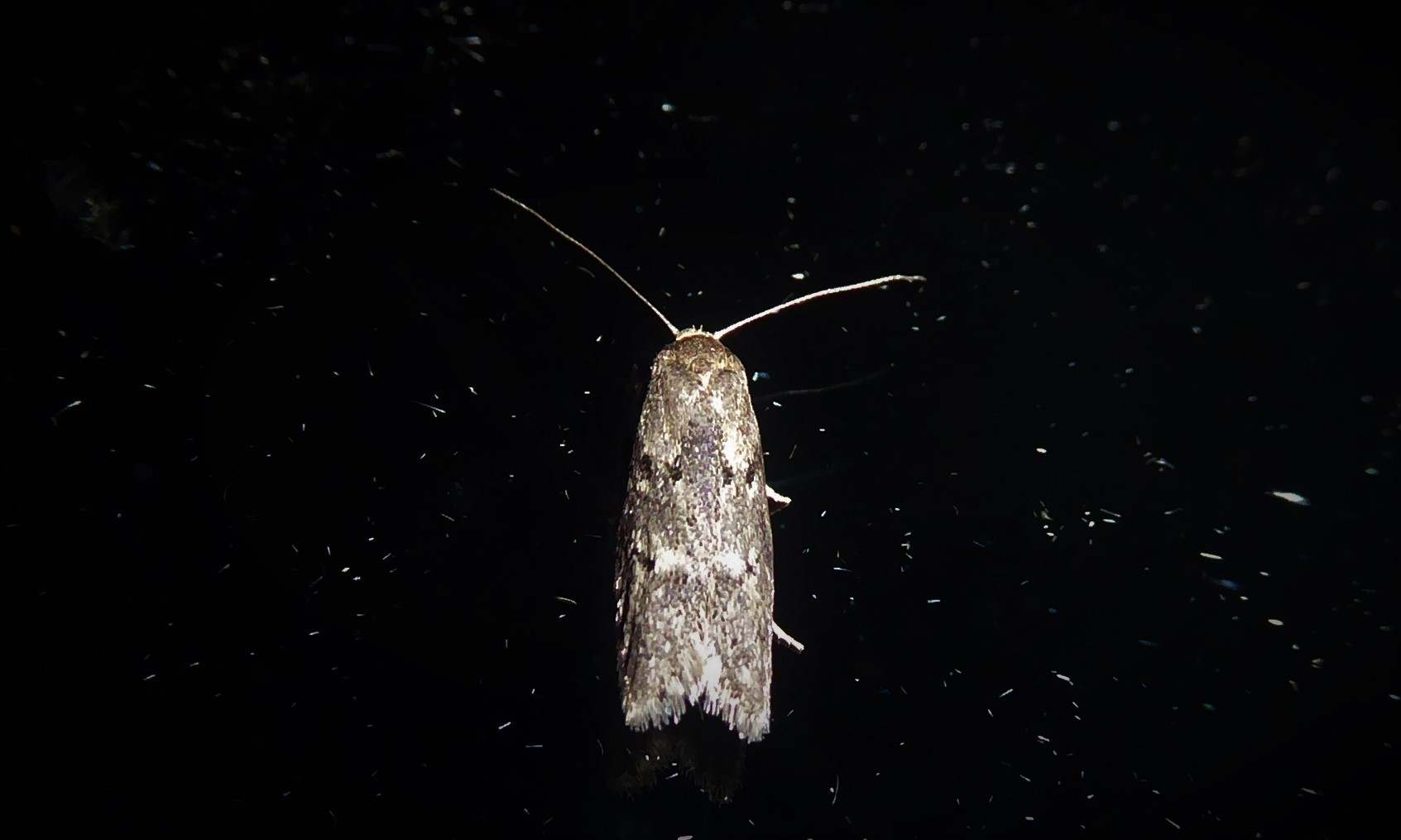
Leptocroca asphaltis observed at Waikouaiti, East Otago
