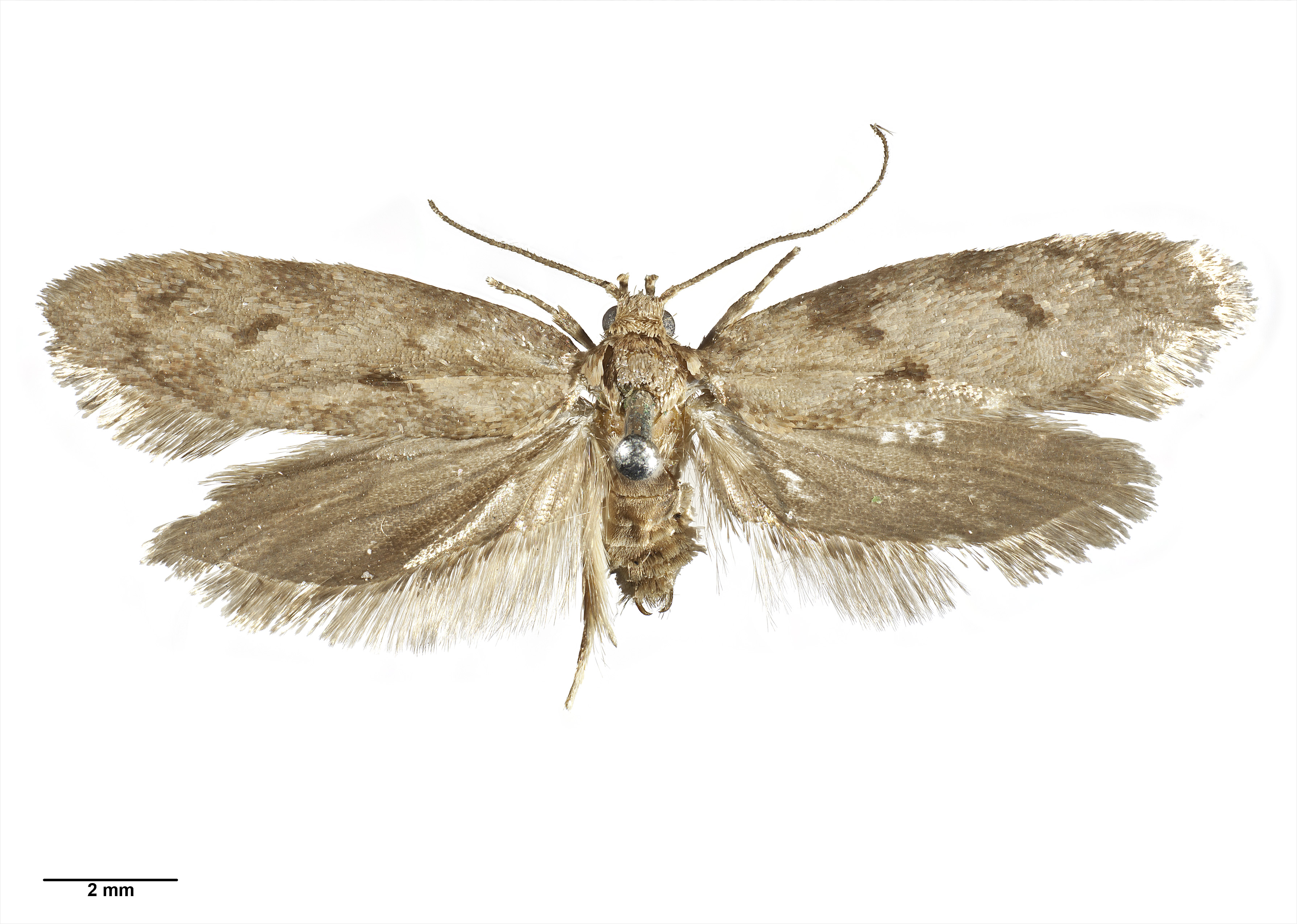
- Male holotype

Scientific classification
- Kingdom: Animalia
- Phylum: Arthropoda
- Class: Insecta
- Order: Lepidoptera
- Superfamily: Gelechioidea
- Family: Oecophoridae
- Genus: Leptocroca
- Species: L. aquilonaris

Binomial name
- Leptocroca aquilonaris Philpott, 1931

= Leptocroca aquilonaris =

Species of moth endemic to New Zealand

Leptocroca aquilonaris is a moth of the family Oecophoridae first described by Alfred Philpott in 1931. It is endemic to New Zealand. The classification of this moth within the genus Leptocroca is regarded as unsatisfactory and in need of revision. As such this species is currently also known as Leptocroca (s.l.) aquilonaris.
