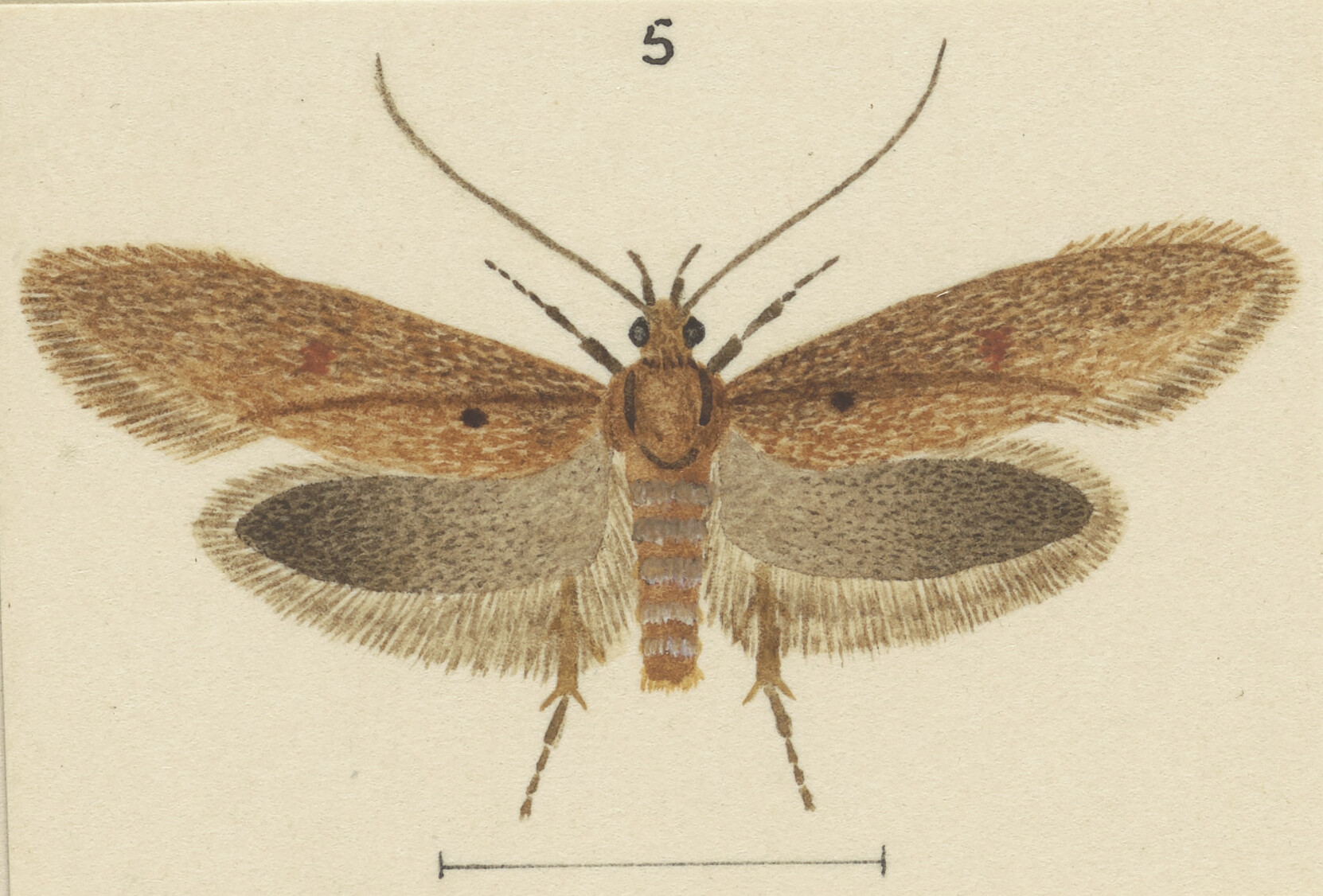

Conservation status
- Data Deficit (NZ TCS)

Scientific classification
- Kingdom: Animalia
- Phylum: Arthropoda
- Clade: Pancrustacea
- Class: Insecta
- Order: Lepidoptera
- Superfamily: Gelechioidea
- Family: Oecophoridae
- Genus: Leptocroca
- Species: L. xyrias

Binomial name
- Leptocroca xyrias Meyrick, 1931

= Leptocroca xyrias =

Species of moth endemic to New Zealand

Leptocroca xyrias is a species of moth in the family Oecophoridae. It is endemic to New Zealand. In 2025 this species was classified as "data deficient" under the New Zealand Threat Classification System. The taxonomy of this species is in need of revision and L. xyrias likely belongs to a separate genus.

== Taxonomy ==
This species was described by Edward Meyrick in 1931 from a specimen collected at "Blackmillar" (Black Miller Stream) at Kaikōura by Stewart Lindsay in December. George Hudson discussed and illustrated this species in his 1939 publication A supplement to the Butterflies and Moths of New Zealand. The genus level classification of this species is regarded as unsatisfactory. As such the species is also known as Leptocroca (s.l.) xyrias. The holotype specimen is held at the Canterbury Museum.

== Description ==
Meyrick described the species as follows:

♂︎. 18mm. - Head, thorax light brownish, slightly sprinkled fuscous. Palpi fuscous, tips of joints whitish. Antennal ciliations 1. Forewings elongate, costa gently arched, apex obtuse, termen very obliquely rounded; brown, suffusedly irrodated fuscous on costal half, except posteriorly; a slightly raised dark fuscous dot beneath fold at 1/4; cilia light grey, basal half overlaid paler, outer third whitish-grey. Hindwings grey, suffusedly irrorated darker on posterior half; cilia light grey, outer third-whitish grey.

== Distribution ==
This species is endemic to New Zealand. It is only known from its collection site in Kaikōura.

== Biology and behaviour ==
This species is on the wing in December.

== Conservation status ==
In 2025 this species was classified by the New Zealand Department of Conservation as "data deficient" under the New Zealand Threat Classification System.
