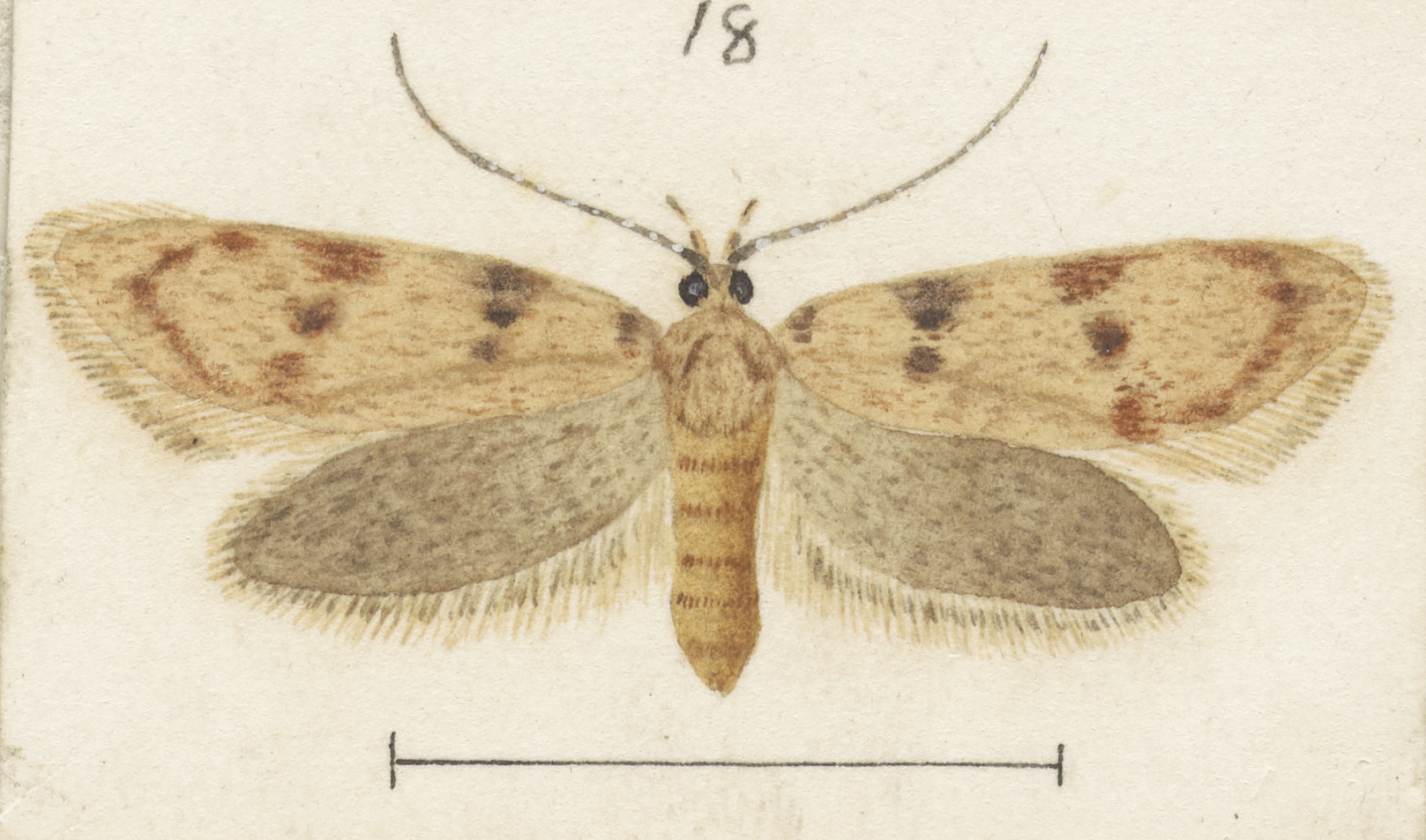

Scientific classification
- Domain: Eukaryota
- Kingdom: Animalia
- Phylum: Arthropoda
- Class: Insecta
- Order: Lepidoptera
- Superfamily: Gelechioidea
- Family: Oecophoridae
- Genus: Leptocroca
- Species: L. scholaea

Binomial name
- Leptocroca scholaea (Meyrick, 1884)

Synonyms
- Oecophora scholaea Meyrick, 1884

= Leptocroca scholaea =

Species of moth

Leptocroca scholaea is a moth of the family Oecophoridae. It was described by Edward Meyrick in 1884. It is found in New Zealand.
