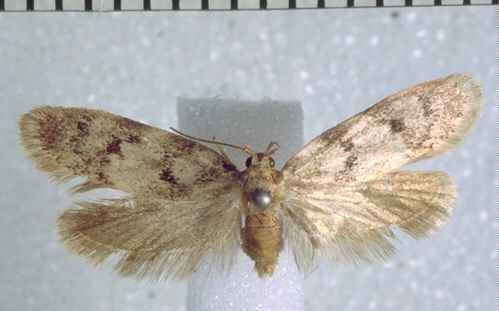
- Male holotype

Scientific classification
- Kingdom: Animalia
- Phylum: Arthropoda
- Class: Insecta
- Order: Lepidoptera
- Superfamily: Gelechioidea
- Family: Oecophoridae
- Genus: Leptocroca
- Species: L. variabilis

Binomial name
- Leptocroca variabilis Philpott, 1926

= Leptocroca variabilis =

Species of moth endemic to New Zealand

Leptocroca variabilis is a moth of the family Oecophoridae first described by Alfred Philpott in 1926. It is endemic to New Zealand. The classification of this moth within the genus Leptocroca is regarded as unsatisfactory and in need of revision. As such this species is currently also known as Leptocroca (s.l.) variabilis.
