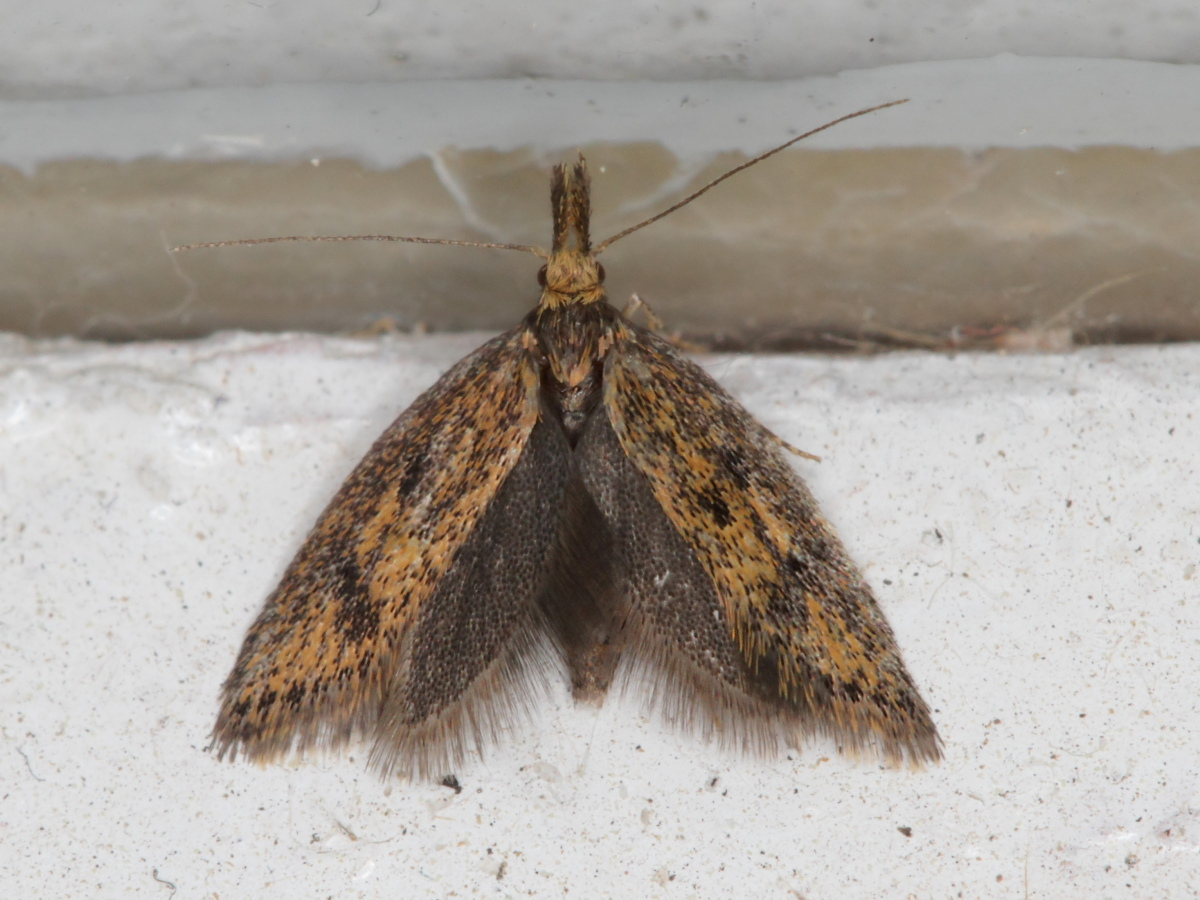

Scientific classification
- Kingdom: Animalia
- Phylum: Arthropoda
- Clade: Pancrustacea
- Class: Insecta
- Order: Lepidoptera
- Family: Oecophoridae
- Genus: Aplota
- Species: A. palpella

Binomial name
- Aplota palpella (Haworth, 1828)

Synonyms
- Ypsolophus palpella Haworth, 1828

= Aplota palpella =

Species of moth

Aplota palpella is a species of moth belonging to the family Oecophoridae. It is native to Europe.
