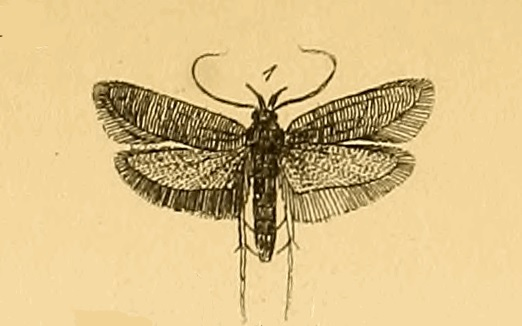

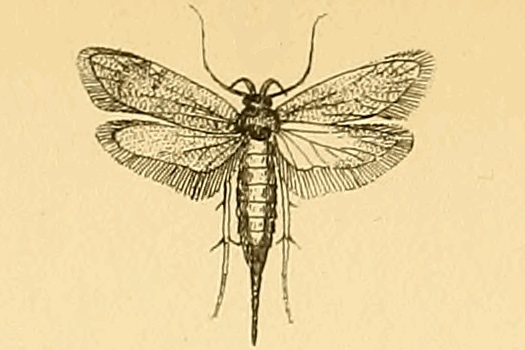

Scientific classification
- Domain: Eukaryota
- Kingdom: Animalia
- Phylum: Arthropoda
- Class: Insecta
- Order: Lepidoptera
- Family: Lecithoceridae
- Genus: Ceuthomadarus
- Species: C. tenebrionellus

Binomial name
- Ceuthomadarus tenebrionellus J. J. Mann, 1864

Synonyms
- Symmoca monochrella Rebel, 1902; Ceuthomadarus crepusculellus Caradja, 1920

= Ceuthomadarus tenebrionellus =

Species of moth

Ceuthomadarus tenebrionellus is a moth in the family Lecithoceridae. It was described by Josef Johann Mann in 1864. It is found in Iran and Asia Minor.
