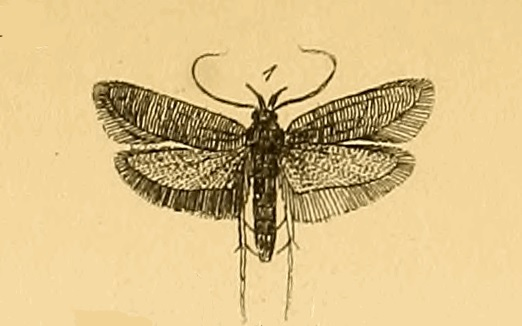
- Ceuthomadarus tenebrionellus
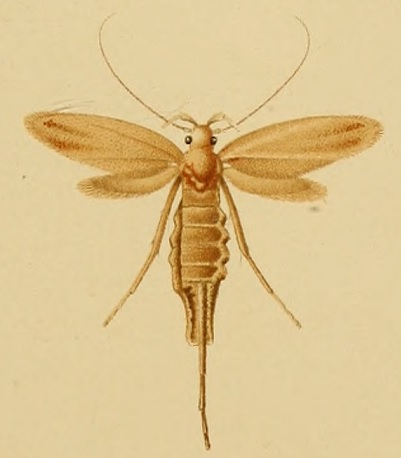
- Ceuthomadarus_viduellus

Scientific classification
- Domain: Eukaryota
- Kingdom: Animalia
- Phylum: Arthropoda
- Class: Insecta
- Order: Lepidoptera
- Family: Lecithoceridae
- Subfamily: Ceuthomadarinae
- Genus: Ceuthomadarus; Mann, 1864

Synonyms
- Exorgana Gozmány, 1957; Asbolistis Meyrick, 1936

= Ceuthomadarus =

Genus of moths

Ceuthomadarus is a genus of moth in the family Lecithoceridae.

== Species ==
- Ceuthomadarus atlantis (Gozmány, 1978)
- Ceuthomadarus chthoniopa (Meyrick, 1936)
- Ceuthomadarus derrai Gozmány, 2002
- Ceuthomadarus funebrella (Chrétien, 1922)
- Ceuthomadarus naumanni (Gozmány, 1987)
- Ceuthomadarus rungsi (Lucas, 1937)
- Ceuthomadarus tenebrionellus Mann, 1864
- Ceuthomadarus viduellus Rebel, 1903
