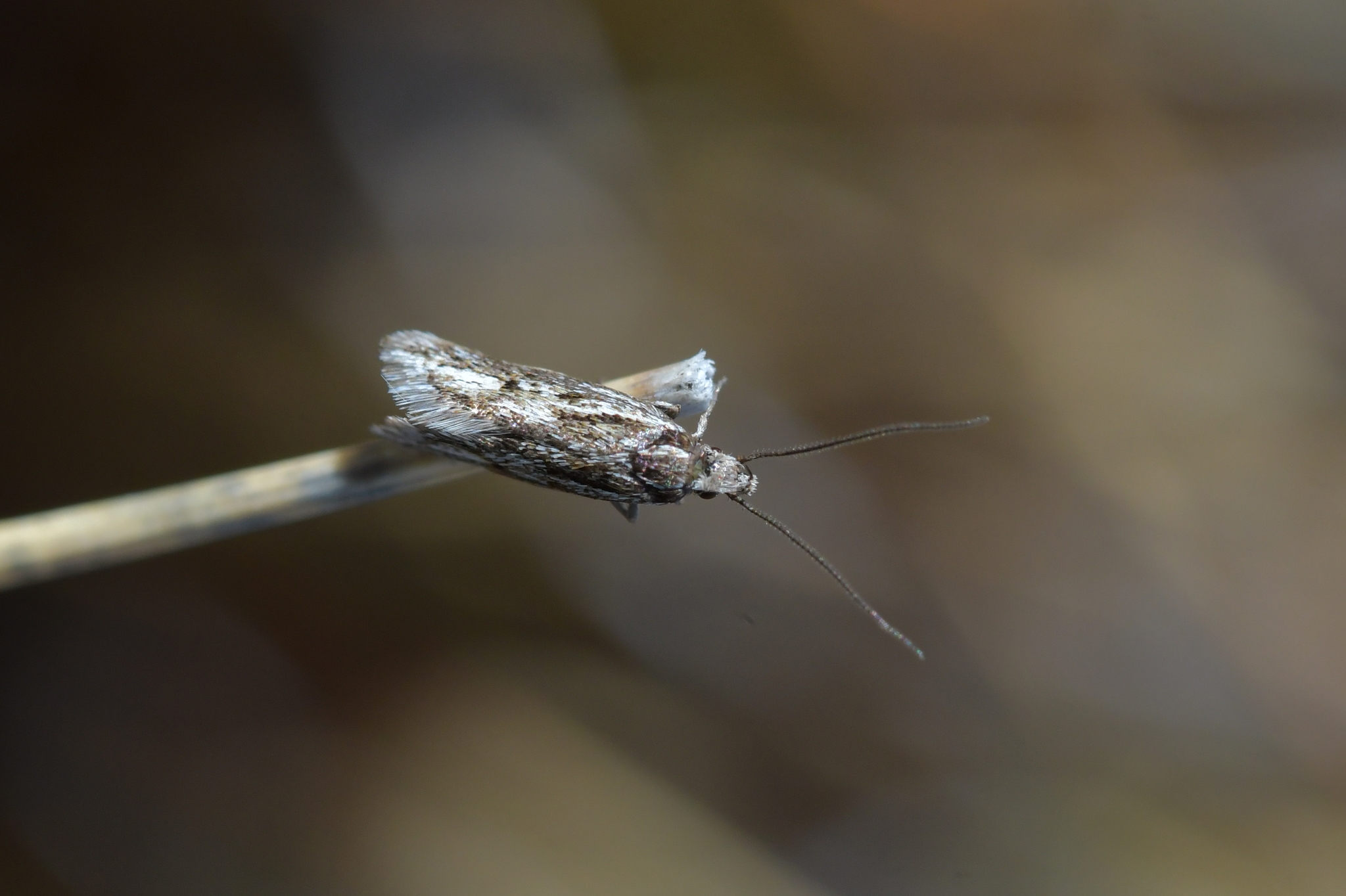
- Prepalla austrina, New Zealand

Scientific classification
- Domain: Eukaryota
- Kingdom: Animalia
- Phylum: Arthropoda
- Class: Insecta
- Order: Lepidoptera
- Family: Oecophoridae
- Genus: Prepalla; Common, 1997

= Prepalla =

Genus of moths

Prepalla is a genus of concealer moths in the family Oecophoridae. There are about 10 described species in Prepalla, found in Australia and New Zealand.

== Species ==
These 10 species belong to the genus Prepalla:

- Prepalla anthracina Turner, 1917
- Prepalla austrina (Meyrick, 1914)
- Prepalla cnephaea Meyrick, 1889
- Prepalla leucophlebia (Turner, 1941)
- Prepalla neurotenes (Turner, 1939)
- Prepalla phloeomima (Turner, 1939)
- Prepalla picea (Turner, 1939)
- Prepalla tephrina Meyrick, 1884
