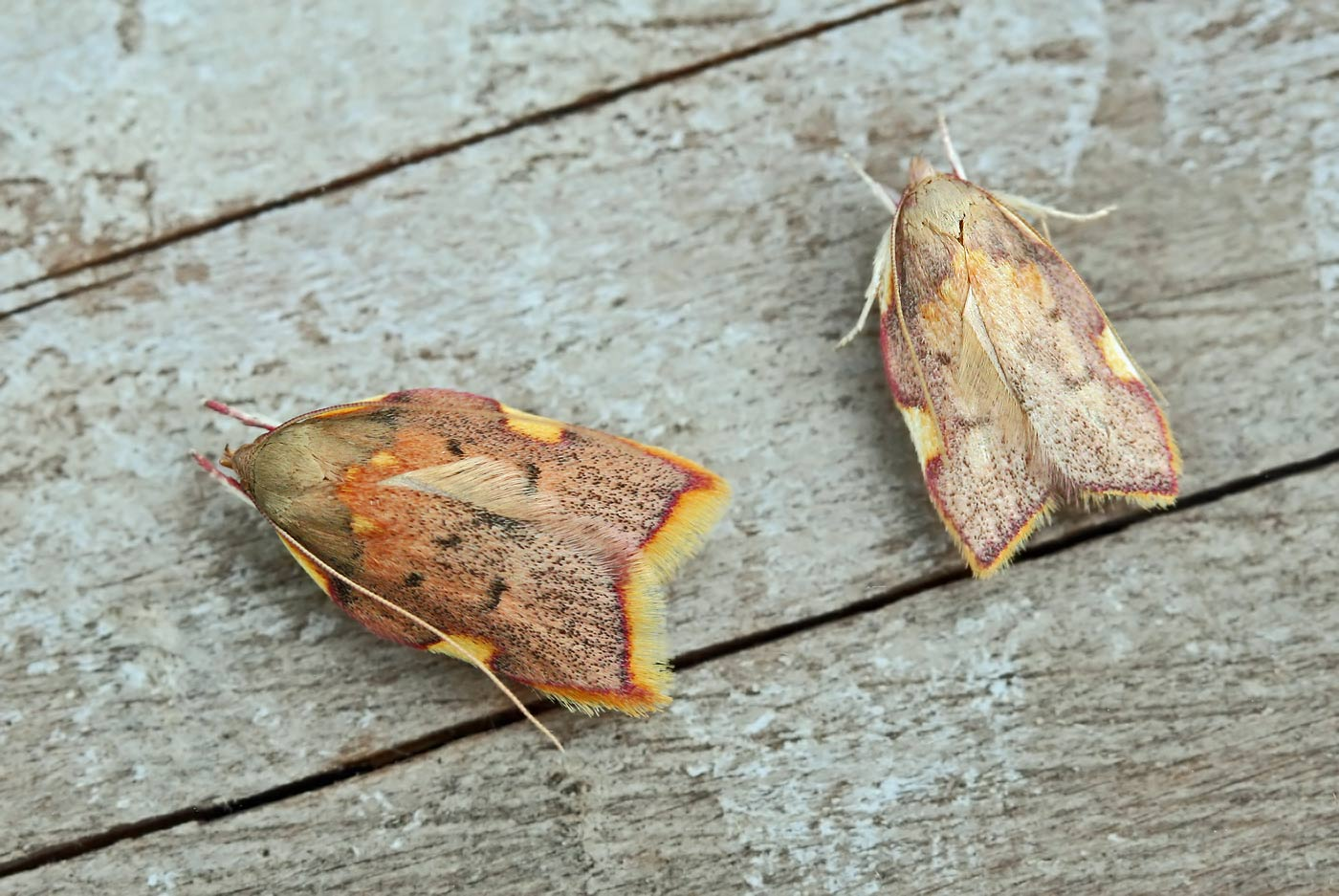
- Carcina quercana

Scientific classification
- Kingdom: Animalia
- Phylum: Arthropoda
- Class: Insecta
- Order: Lepidoptera
- Family: Depressariidae
- Genus: Carcina; Hübner, [1825]

Synonyms
- Phibalocera Stephens, 1829; Heterodmeta Meyrick, 1931

= Carcina =

Genus of moths

Carcina is a moth genus of the family Depressariidae.

== Species ==
- Carcina haemographa Meyrick, 1937
- Carcina luridella (Christoph, 1882)
- Carcina quercana (Fabricius, 1775) - oak long-horned flat-body
- Carcina ingridmariae Huemer, 2025
