= Leptocroca vinaria =

- Living specimen

Scientific classification
- Kingdom: Animalia
- Phylum: Arthropoda
- Clade: Pancrustacea
- Class: Insecta
- Order: Lepidoptera
- Family: Oecophoridae
- Genus: Leptocroca
- Species: L. vinaria

Binomial name
- Leptocroca vinaria (Meyrick, 1914)

Synonyms
- Trachypepla vinaria Meyrick, 1914; Leptocroca obliqua Philpott, 1930

Species of moth endemic to New Zealand

Leptocroca vinaria is a moth of the family Oecophoridae. It was first described by Edward Meyrick in 1914 and placed in the genus Leptocroca by John S. Dugdale in 1988. However the classification of this moth within this genus is regarded as being unsatisfactory and in need of revision. This species is endemic to New Zealand and has been observed in both the North and South Islands. It inhabits native forest and can be observed on the wing most frequently in December and January. However the indistinct appearance of this moth likely has led to it being overlooked.

== Taxonomy ==
L. vinaria was first described by Edward Meyrick in 1914 using specimens collected at Ōtira River and Greymouth, and originally named Trachypepla vinaria. George Hudson discussed and illustrated this species under that name in his book The butterflies and moths of New Zealand. In 1930 Alfred Philpott, thinking he was describing a new species, named this moth Leptocroca obliqua. In 1939 Hudson synonymised this name with T. vinaria stating that he was unable to distinguish L. obliqua from the type specimen of T. vinaria. In 1988 John S. Dugdale placed this species in the genus Leptocroca. The male lectotype, collected by Hudson at the Ōtira River in February, is held at the Natural History Museum, London.

The classification of this moth within the genus Leptocroca is regarded as unsatisfactory and in need of revision. As such this species is currently also known as Leptocroca (s.l.) vinaria.

== Description ==
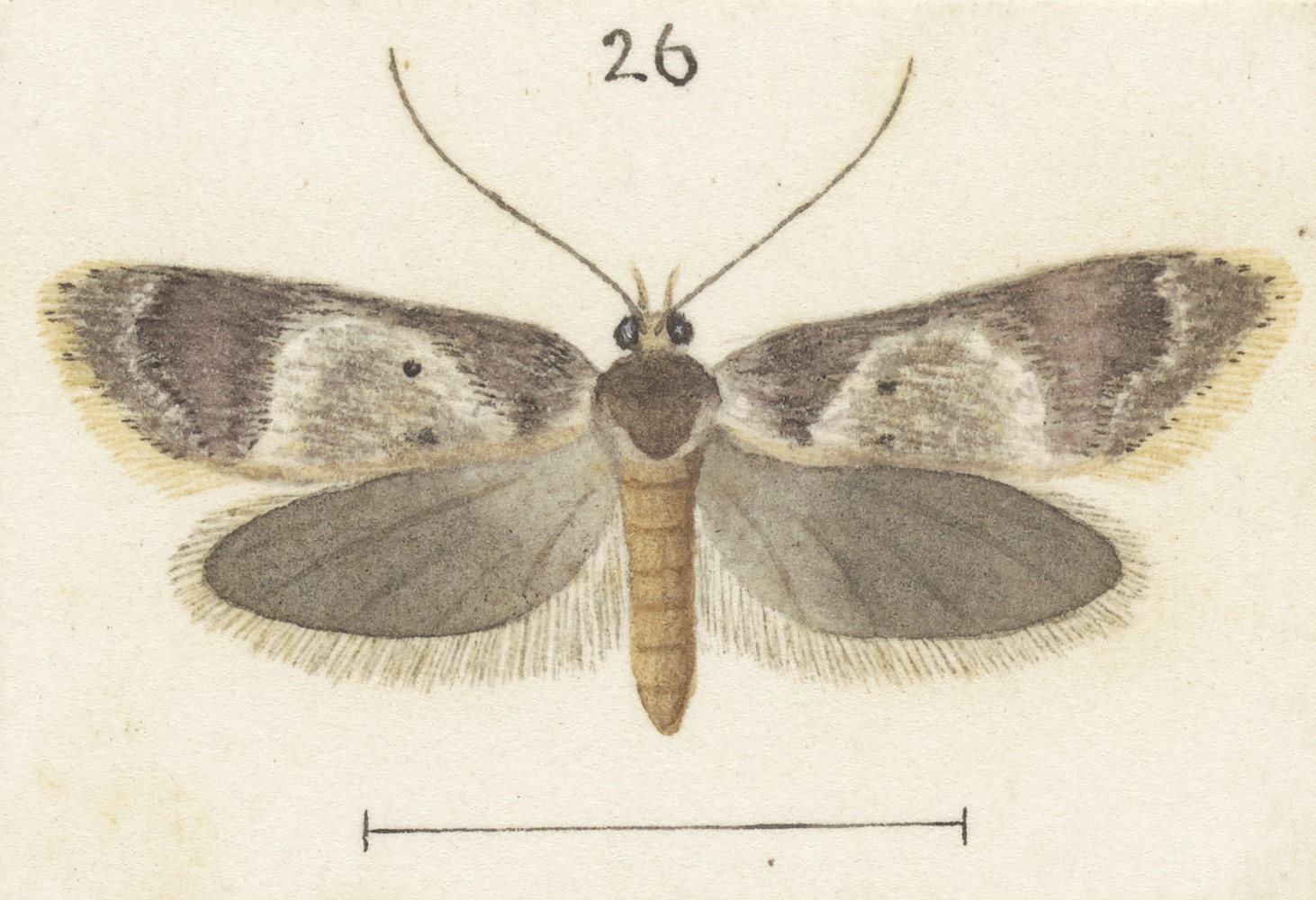
Illustration by Hudson.

Meyrick described this species as follows:

♂♀. 19-21 mm. Head whitish-ochreous. Palpi fuscous, apex of joints whitish. Antennal ciliations of ♂ 1. Abdomen whitish-ochreous. Forewings elongate, rather narrow towards base, costa gently arched, apex obtuse, termen rounded, rather strongly oblique ; pale-brownish suffusedly mixed with white ; a triangular purple-brownish patch sprinkled with dark fuscous extending over basal 2/5 of costa and reaching to below fold, outer edge inwardly oblique ; stigmata dark fuscous surrounded with white, plical slightly beyond first discal ; a small undefined brownish-ochreous patch sprinkled with dark fuscous on dorsum beyond middle ; an oblique moderately broad brownish fascia from beyond middle of costa to tornus, suffused with purple towards costa, anterior edge traversing second discal stigma and marked with dark-fuscous irroration ; a triangular purple-brown spot on costa at 4/5, whence an indistinct angulated line of dark-fuscous scales runs to tornus ; a series of cloudy dots of dark-fuscous irroration round posterior part of costa and termen : cilia whitish, towards tips greyish, base dotted with dark-fuscous irroration. Hindwings light grey, darker posteriorly ; cilia grey-whitish, greyer towards base.

Hudson states that this species varies considerably in the intensity of its markings and that those markings can be indistinct. Occasionally specimens have been observed where the pale ground colour is predominant. Hudson points out that the indistinct appearance of this has likely led to it being overlooked.

== Distribution ==
This species is endemic to New Zealand and has been observed in the North and South Islands. Hudson said this species had been collected in Wellington, Mount Arthur, Arthur's Pass and Ōtira River and regarded this species as being very local.

== Habitat ==
This species inhabits native forest.

== Behaviour ==
Adults have been observed on the wing most commonly in December and January.
