= Ceuthomadarus funebrella =

Scientific classification
- Kingdom: Animalia
- Phylum: Arthropoda
- Clade: Pancrustacea
- Class: Insecta
- Order: Lepidoptera
- Family: Lecithoceridae
- Genus: Ceuthomadarus
- Species: C. funebrella

Binomial name
- Ceuthomadarus funebrella (Chrétien, 1922)

Synonyms
- Symmoca funebrella Chrétien, 1922

Species of moth

Ceuthomadarus funebrella is a moth in the family Lecithoceridae. It was described by Pierre Chrétien in 1922. It is found in Morocco.
