= Schistonoea =

Schistonoeidae

Scientific classification
- Kingdom: Animalia
- Phylum: Arthropoda
- Clade: Pancrustacea
- Class: Insecta
- Order: Lepidoptera
- Clade: Ditrysia
- Clade: Apoditrysia
- Superfamily: Gelechioidea
- Family: Schistonoeidae; Hodges, 1998
- Genus: Schistonoea; Forbes, 1931
- Species: S. fulvidella

Binomial name
- Schistonoea fulvidella (Walsingham, 1897)

Synonyms
- Family; Schistonoeinae Forbes, 1931; Species; Brachmia fulvidella Walsingham, 1897

Genus of moths

Schistonoeidae is a monotypic moth family, described by Ronald W. Hodges in 1998, in the superfamily Gelechioidea. It contains one monotypic genus, Schistonoea, described by William Trowbridge Merrifield Forbes in 1931. Its one species, Schistonoea fulvidella, described by Lord Walsingham in 1897, is found in the West Indies.

The wingspan is about 15 mm. The forewings are whitish ochreous, variable in the colour and quantity of their shading. Some have a tawny-reddish suffusion extending from the base nearly to the termen, around which is a row of six elongate fuscous spots, the pale ground colour appearing also in a narrow streak along the base of the fold and in a streak along the discal cell, in which are two fuscous blotches, the larger before, the smaller one beyond the middle. In other specimens, the dorsal half of the wing is almost entirely whitish ochreous, the reddish suffusion being confined to the costal and apical portions. The hindwings are pale greyish.
