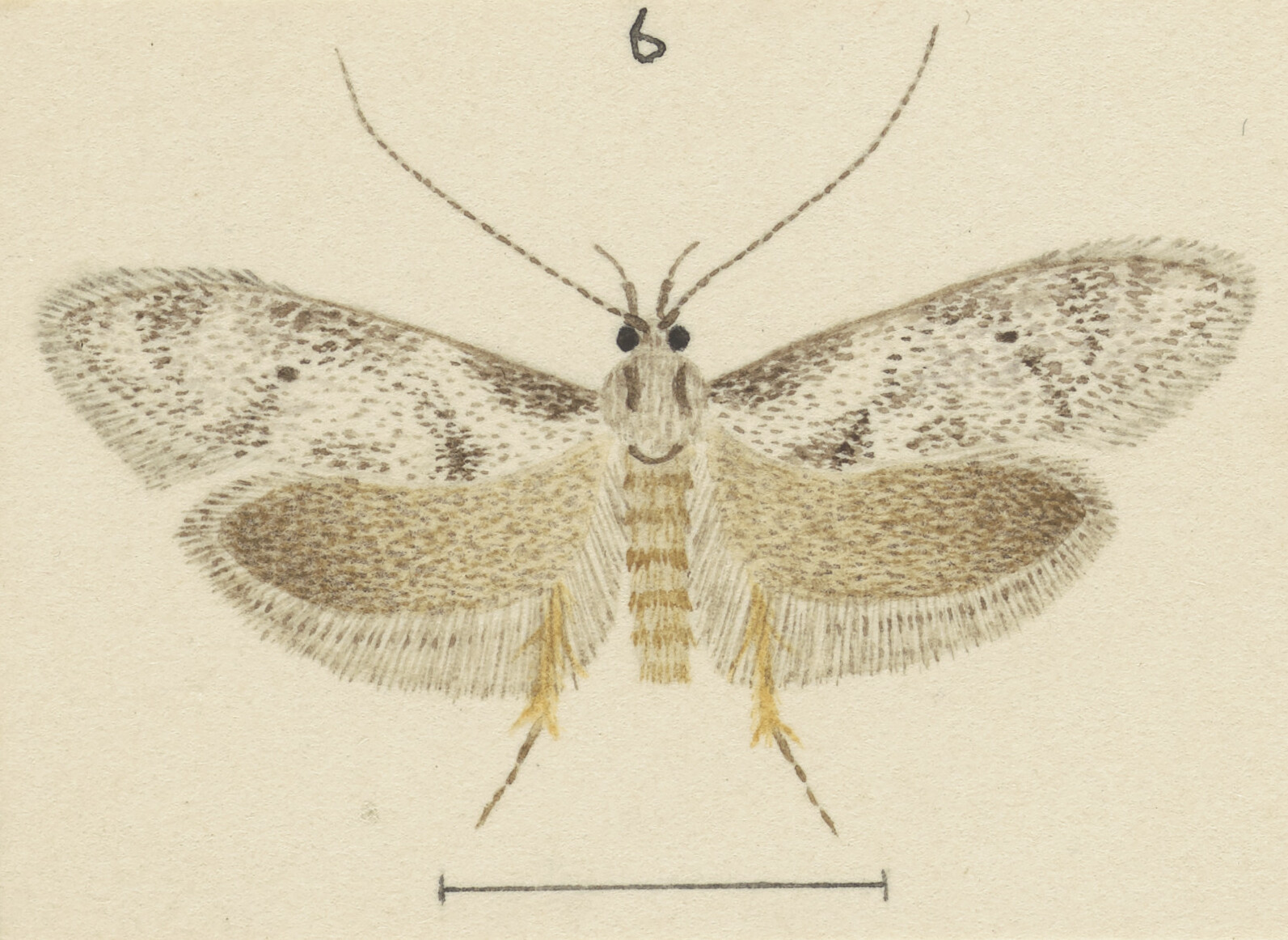

Scientific classification
- Domain: Eukaryota
- Kingdom: Animalia
- Phylum: Arthropoda
- Class: Insecta
- Order: Lepidoptera
- Superfamily: Gelechioidea
- Family: Oecophoridae
- Genus: Leptocroca
- Species: L. lindsayi

Binomial name
- Leptocroca lindsayi Philpott, 1930

= Leptocroca lindsayi =

Species of moth

Leptocroca lindsayi is a moth of the family Oecophoridae. It was described by Philpott in 1930. It is found in New Zealand.
