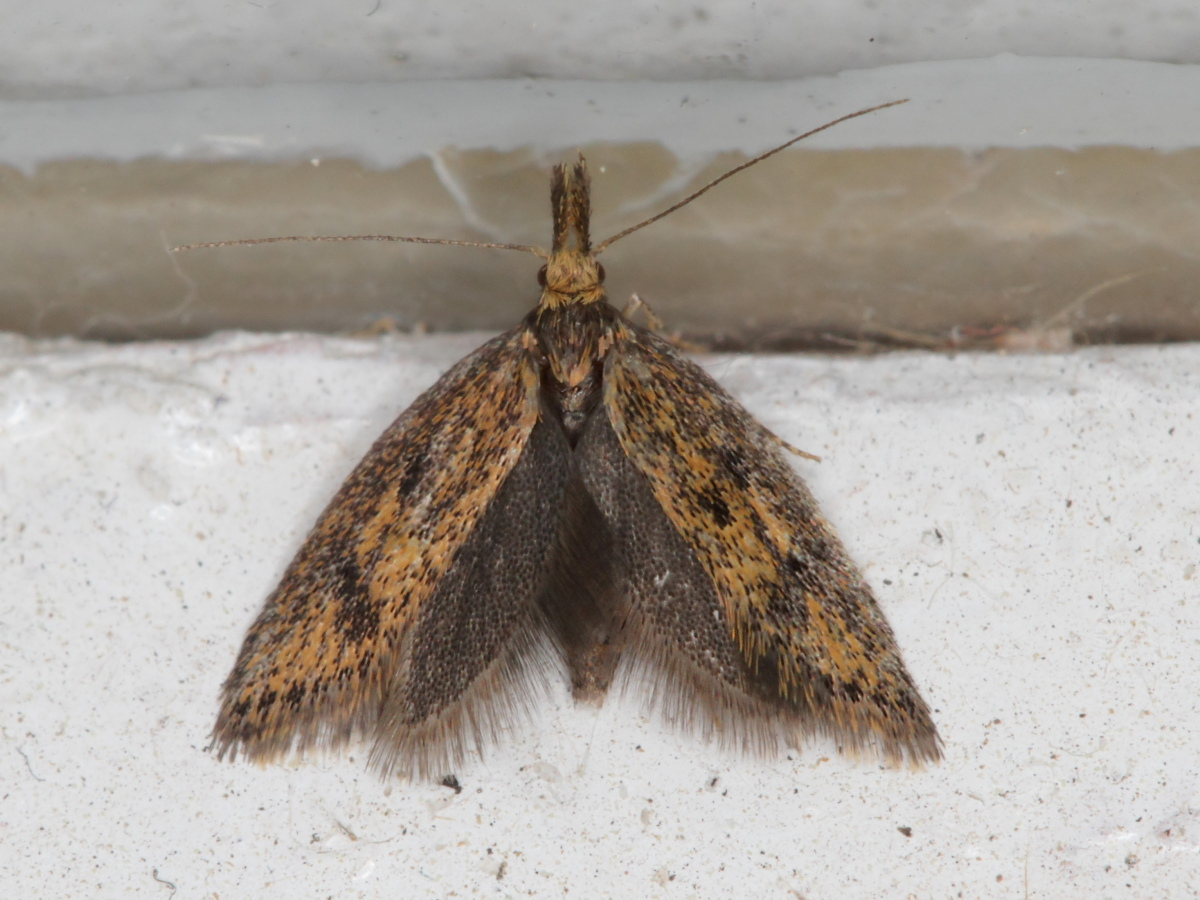
- Aplota palpella

Scientific classification
- Kingdom: Animalia
- Phylum: Arthropoda
- Clade: Pancrustacea
- Class: Insecta
- Order: Lepidoptera
- Family: Oecophoridae
- Subfamily: Pleurotinae
- Genus: Aplota; Stephens, 1834

Synonyms
- Haplota Dunning & Pickard, 1859; Haplotes Agassiz, 1847

= Aplota =

Genus of moths

Aplota is a genus of moths in the concealer moth family Oecophoridae.

== Species ==
The following species are recognised in the genus Aplota:

- Aplota nigricans (Zeller, 1852)
- Aplota palpella (Haworth, 1828)
