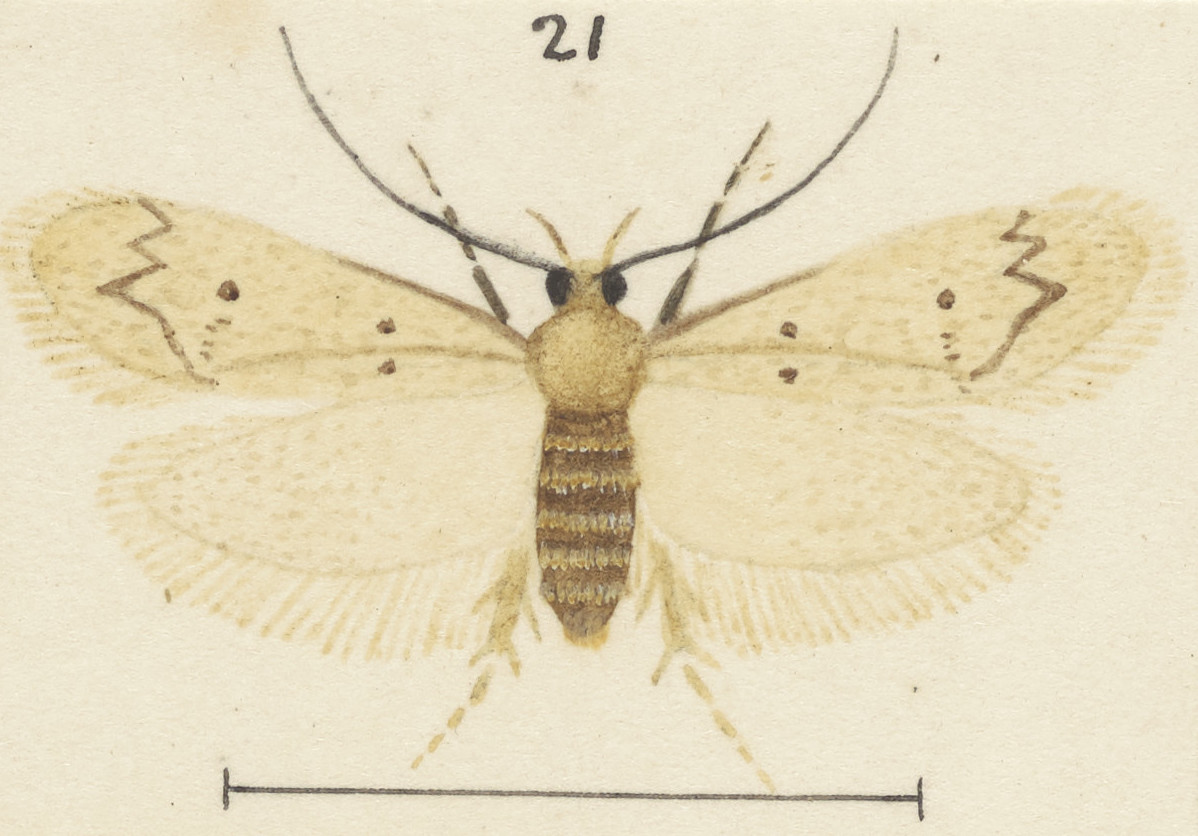
- Illustration of female

Scientific classification
- Domain: Eukaryota
- Kingdom: Animalia
- Phylum: Arthropoda
- Class: Insecta
- Order: Lepidoptera
- Family: Oecophoridae
- Genus: Leptocroca
- Species: L. amenena

Binomial name
- Leptocroca amenena ( Meyrick, 1888)

Synonyms
- Peltophora amenena Meyrick, 1888

= Leptocroca amenena =

Species of moth

Leptocroca amenena is a moth of the family Oecophoridae first described by Edward Meyrick in 1888. It is endemic to New Zealand. The classification of this moth within the genus Leptocroca is regarded as unsatisfactory and in need of revision. As such this species is currently also known as Leptocroca (s.l.) amenena.
