= Ceuthomadarus chthoniopa =

Scientific classification
- Kingdom: Animalia
- Phylum: Arthropoda
- Class: Insecta
- Order: Lepidoptera
- Family: Lecithoceridae
- Genus: Ceuthomadarus
- Species: C. chthoniopa

Binomial name
- Ceuthomadarus chthoniopa (Meyrick, 1936)

Synonyms
- Asbolistis chthoniopa Meyrick, 1936; Exorgana iranica Gozmány, 1957

Species of moth

Ceuthomadarus chthoniopa is a moth in the family Lecithoceridae. It was described by Edward Meyrick in 1936. It is found in Iran and Iraq.

The wingspan is about 15 mm.
