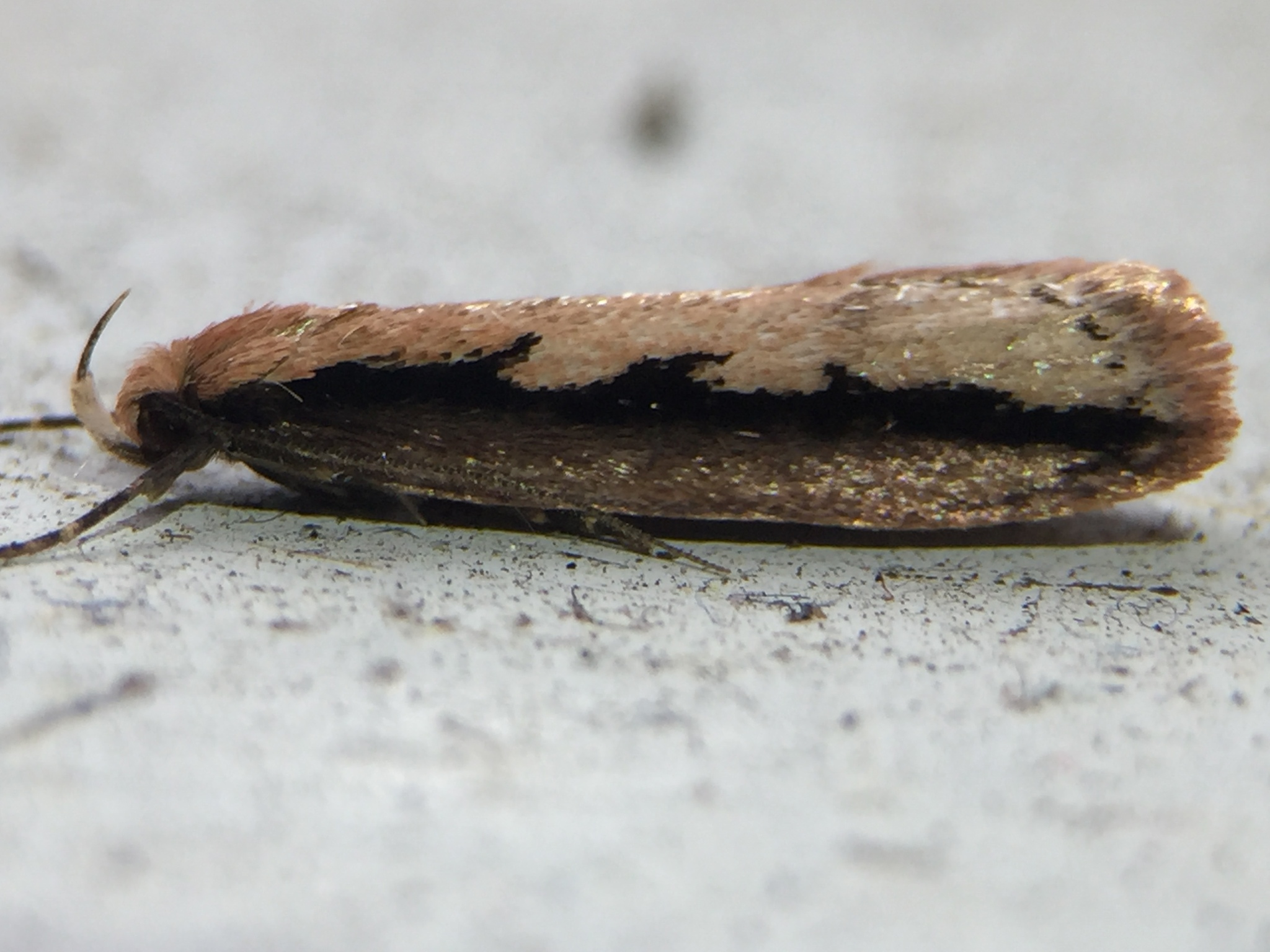
- Leptocroca sanguinolenta, New Zealand

Scientific classification
- Domain: Eukaryota
- Kingdom: Animalia
- Phylum: Arthropoda
- Class: Insecta
- Order: Lepidoptera
- Family: Oecophoridae
- Genus: Leptocroca; Meyrick, 1883

= Leptocroca =

Genus of moths

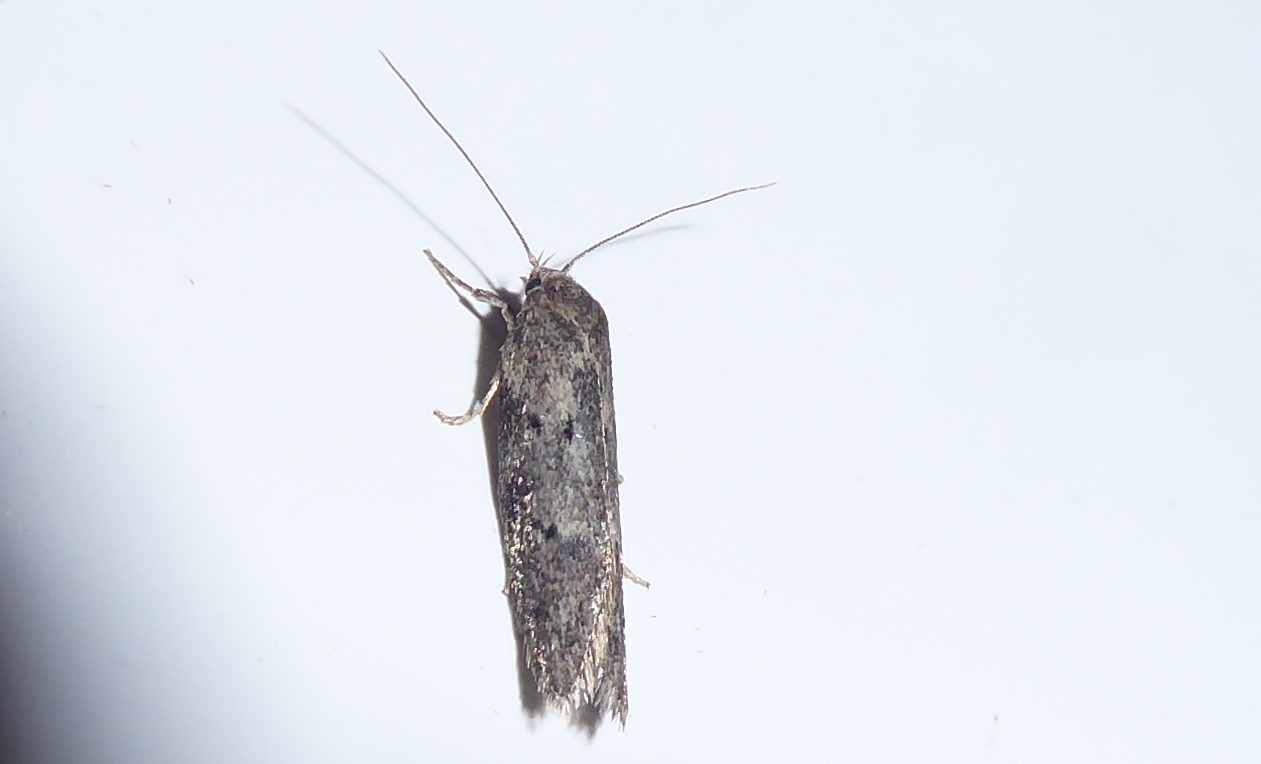
Leptocroca asphaltis, New Zealand

Leptocroca is a genus of concealer moths in the family Oecophoridae. There are at least 13 described species in Leptocroca, found in Australia and New Zealand.

== Species ==
These 13 species belong to the genus Leptocroca:

- Leptocroca amenena (Meyrick, 1888)
- Leptocroca aquilonaris Philpott, 1931
- Leptocroca asphaltis Meyrick
- Leptocroca lenita Philpott, 1931
- Leptocroca lindsayi Philpott, 1930
- Leptocroca obliqua Philpott, 1930
- Leptocroca porophora (Meyrick, 1929)
- Leptocroca sanguinolenta Meyrick, 1886
- Leptocroca scholaea Meyrick, 1884
- Leptocroca vacua Philpott, 1926
- Leptocroca variabilis Philpott, 1926
- Leptocroca vinaria (Meyrick, 1914)
- Leptocroca xyrias Meyrick, 1931
