= Ceuthomadarus derrai =

Scientific classification
- Kingdom: Animalia
- Phylum: Arthropoda
- Clade: Pancrustacea
- Class: Insecta
- Order: Lepidoptera
- Family: Lecithoceridae
- Genus: Ceuthomadarus
- Species: C. derrai

Binomial name
- Ceuthomadarus derrai Gozmány, 2002

Species of moth

Ceuthomadarus derrai is a moth in the family Lecithoceridae. It was described by László Anthony Gozmány in 2002. It is found in Morocco.
