= Ceuthomadarus naumanni =

Scientific classification
- Kingdom: Animalia
- Phylum: Arthropoda
- Clade: Pancrustacea
- Class: Insecta
- Order: Lepidoptera
- Family: Lecithoceridae
- Genus: Ceuthomadarus
- Species: C. naumanni

Binomial name
- Ceuthomadarus naumanni (Gozmány, 1987)

Synonyms
- Ceuthomaradus naumanni Gozmány, 1987

Species of moth

Ceuthomadarus naumanni is a moth in the family Lecithoceridae. It was described by László Anthony Gozmány in 1987. It is found in Afghanistan.
