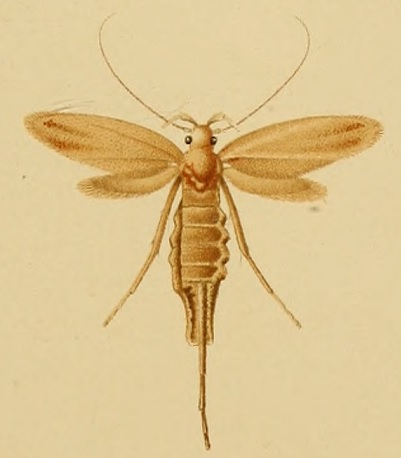

Scientific classification
- Domain: Eukaryota
- Kingdom: Animalia
- Phylum: Arthropoda
- Class: Insecta
- Order: Lepidoptera
- Family: Lecithoceridae
- Genus: Ceuthomadarus
- Species: C. viduellus

Binomial name
- Ceuthomadarus viduellus Rebel, 1903

= Ceuthomadarus viduellus =

Species of moth

Ceuthomadarus viduellus is a moth in the family Lecithoceridae. It was described by Hans Rebel in 1903. It is found in Bulgaria and Greece.
