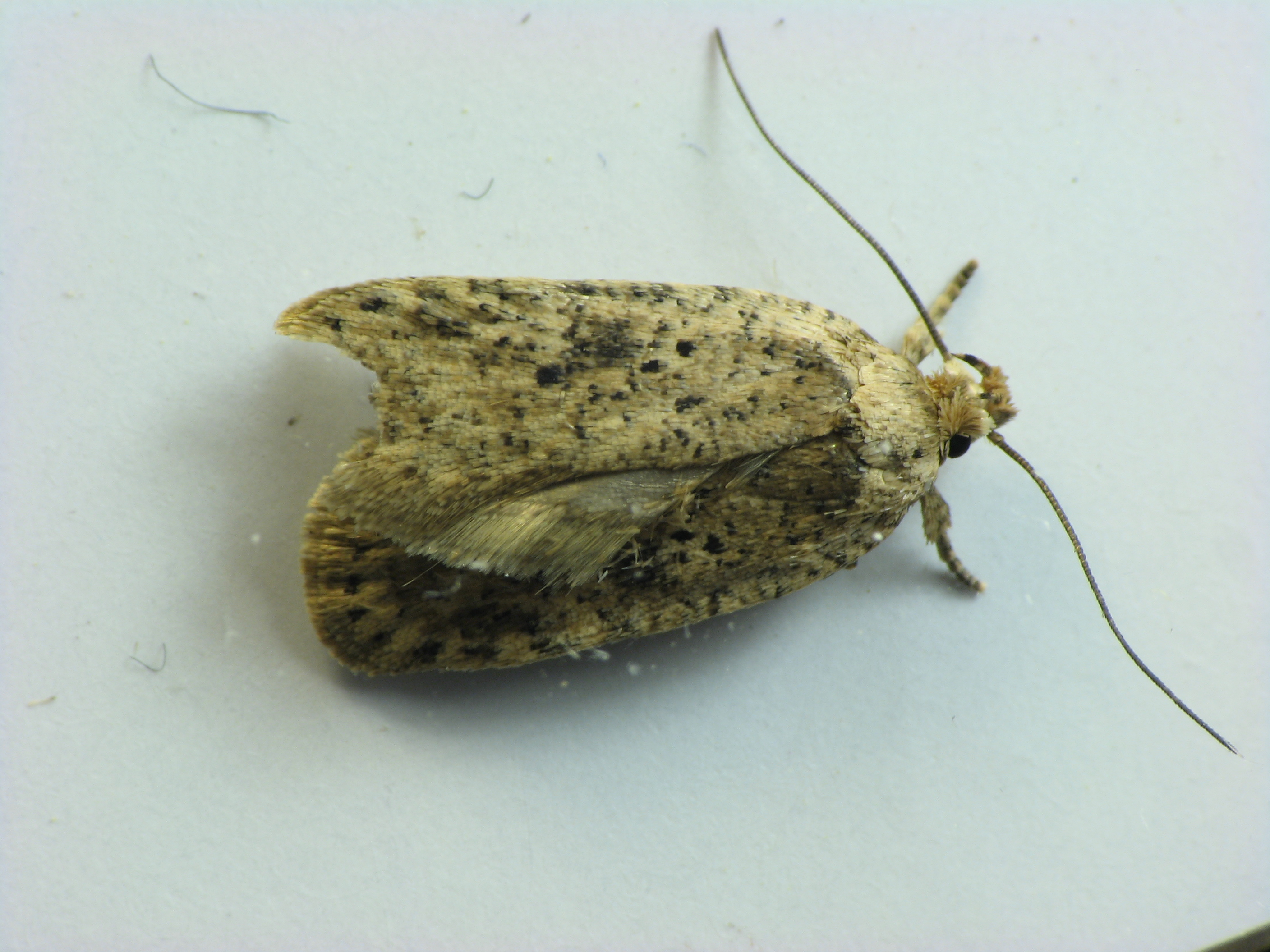

Scientific classification
- Kingdom: Animalia
- Phylum: Arthropoda
- Clade: Pancrustacea
- Class: Insecta
- Order: Lepidoptera
- Family: Depressariidae
- Genus: Agonopterix
- Species: A. senicionella

Binomial name
- Agonopterix senicionella (Busck, 1902)

Synonyms
- Depressaria senicionella Busck, 1902

= Agonopterix senicionella =

Species of moth

Agonopterix senicionella is a moth in the family Depressariidae. It was described by August Busck in 1902. It is found in North America, where it has been recorded from Kentucky, Michigan, Ohio, Virginia and West Virginia.

The wingspan is 18–22 mm. The forewings are dark ochrous gray, overlaid and suffused with brownish ochrous. There is a light basal patch, suffused on the costa with fuscous, containing a blackish-fuscous spot in the fold and bordered outwardly by a fading fuscous shade. There are two black discal dots at the basal third in the cell and a black discal dot at the end of the cell, preceded by an indistinct fuscous shade. The termen and costa are marked with ill-defined fuscous spots. The hindwings are grayish fuscous, but darker apically.

The larvae feed on Packera aurea (Senecio aureus).

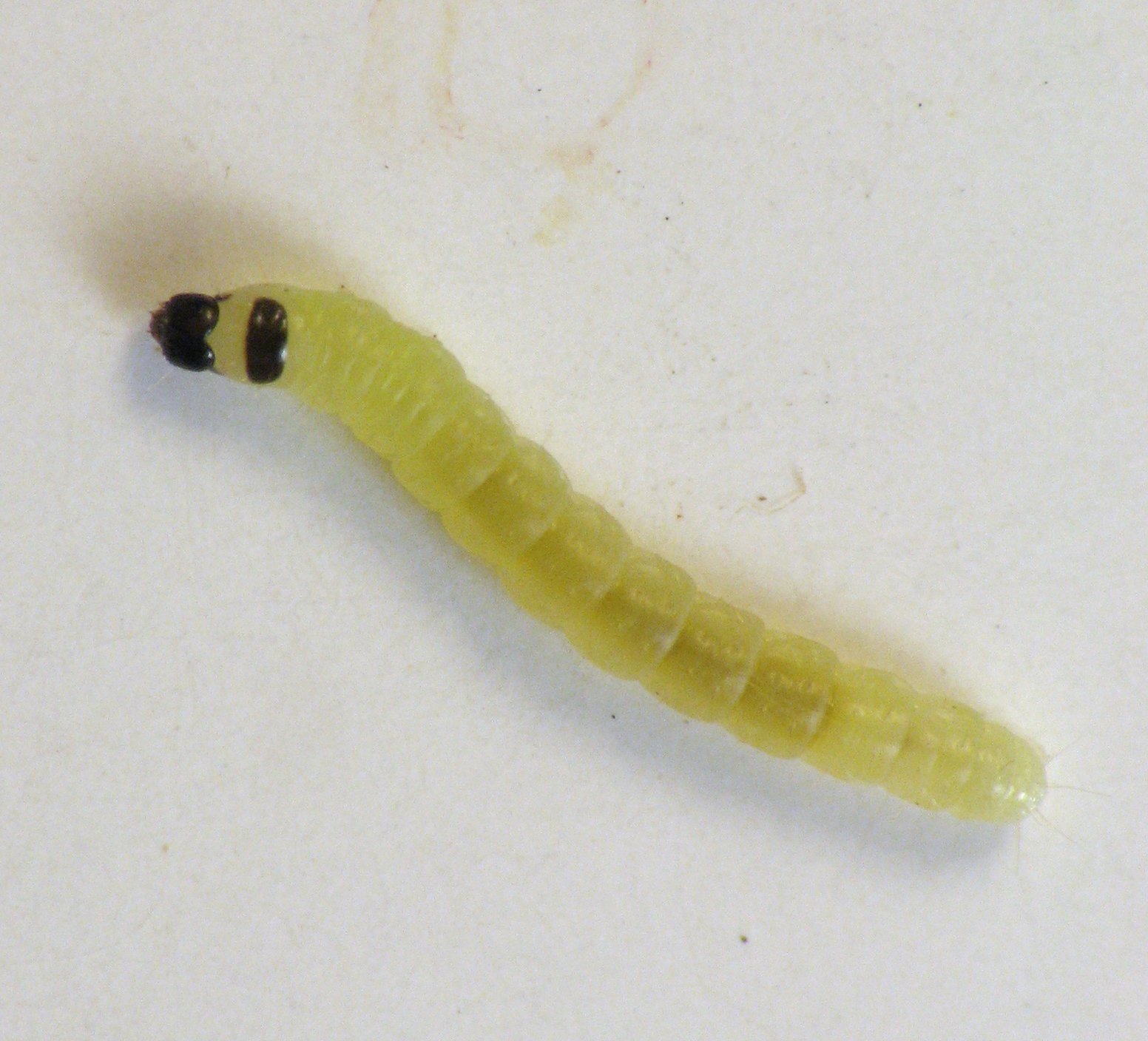
Caterpillar
