= Ceuthomadarus rungsi =

Scientific classification
- Domain: Eukaryota
- Kingdom: Animalia
- Phylum: Arthropoda
- Class: Insecta
- Order: Lepidoptera
- Family: Lecithoceridae
- Genus: Ceuthomadarus
- Species: C. rungsi

Binomial name
- Ceuthomadarus rungsi (D. Lucas, 1937)

Synonyms
- Symmoca rungsi D. Lucas, 1937

Species of moth

Ceuthomadarus rungsi is a moth in the family Lecithoceridae. It was described by Daniel Lucas in 1937. It is found in Morocco.
