= Glyphidocerinae =

Scientific classification
- Kingdom: Animalia
- Phylum: Arthropoda
- Clade: Pancrustacea
- Class: Insecta
- Order: Lepidoptera
- Family: Autostichidae
- Subfamily: Glyphidocerinae; Hodges, 1998

Subfamily of moths

Glyphidocerinae is a subfamily of moths in the family Autostichidae.

== Taxonomy and systematics ==
- Glyphidocera Walsingham, [1892]
