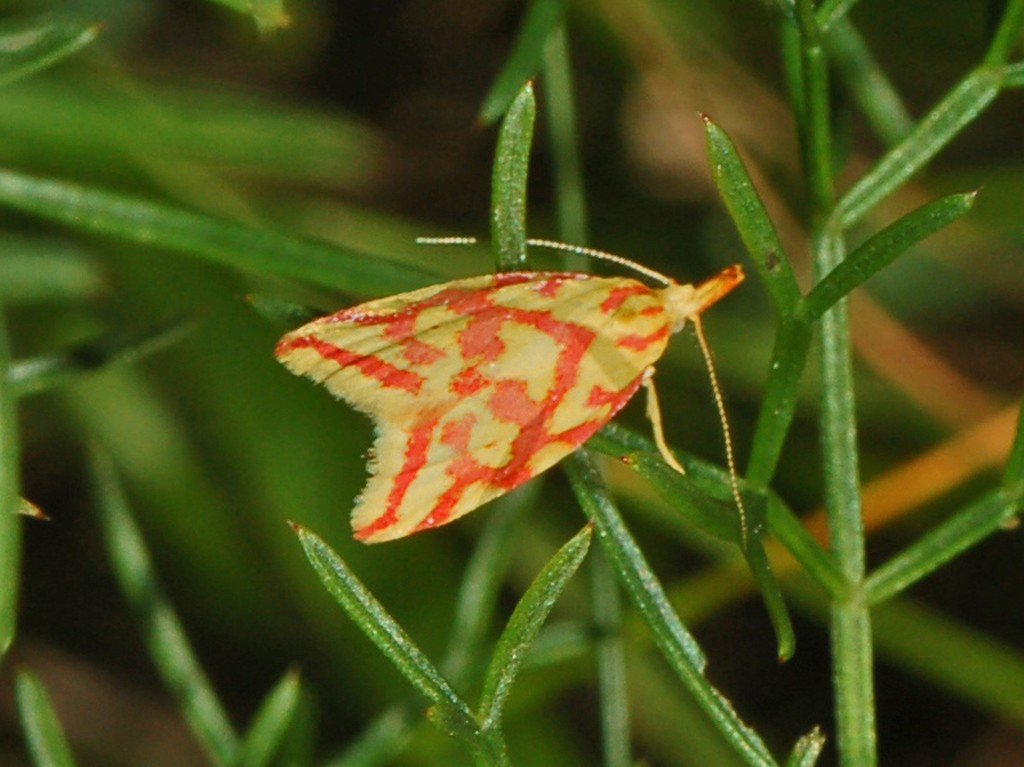
- Hypercallia citrinalis

Scientific classification
- Kingdom: Animalia
- Phylum: Arthropoda
- Clade: Pancrustacea
- Class: Insecta
- Order: Lepidoptera
- Family: Depressariidae
- Subfamily: Hypercalliinae; Leraut, 1993

Synonyms
- Anchiniinae Fetz, 1994

= Hypercalliinae =

Subfamily of moths

The Hypercalliinae are a subfamily of small moths in the family Depressariidae.

== Genera ==
- Anchinia Hübner, [1825]
- Coptotelia Zeller, 1863
- Gonionota Zeller, 1877
- Hypercallia Stephens, 1829
