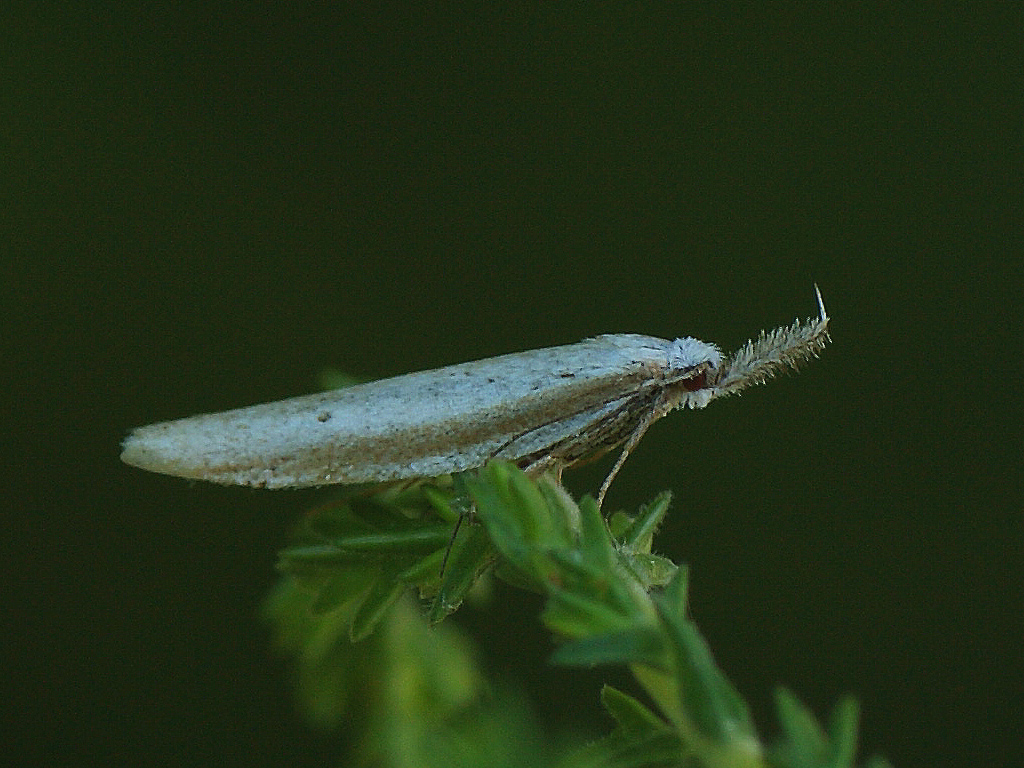
- Pleurota bicostella

Scientific classification
- Kingdom: Animalia
- Phylum: Arthropoda
- Clade: Pancrustacea
- Class: Insecta
- Order: Lepidoptera
- Family: Oecophoridae
- Subfamily: Pleurotinae; Toll, 1956

Synonyms
- Pleurotini

= Pleurotinae =

Genus of moths

Pleurotinae is a subfamily of moths in the family Oecophoridae.

== Genera ==
- Minetia Leraut, 1991
- Pleurota Hübner, [1825]
- Holoscolia Zeller, 1839
- Aplota Stephens, 1834
