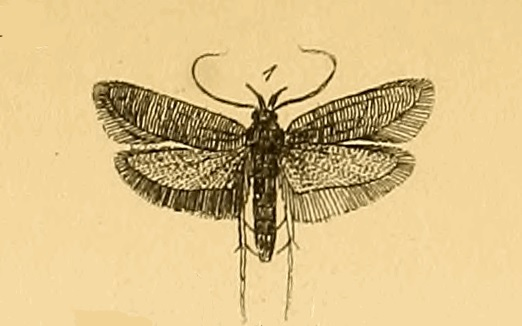

Scientific classification
- Kingdom: Animalia
- Phylum: Arthropoda
- Clade: Pancrustacea
- Class: Insecta
- Order: Lepidoptera
- Family: Lecithoceridae
- Subfamily: Ceuthomadarinae; Gozmány, 1978

= Ceuthomadarinae =

Subfamily of moths

The Ceuthomadarinae are a subfamily of small moths in the family Lecithoceridae.

== Taxonomy and systematics ==
- Ceuthomadarus Mann, 1864
