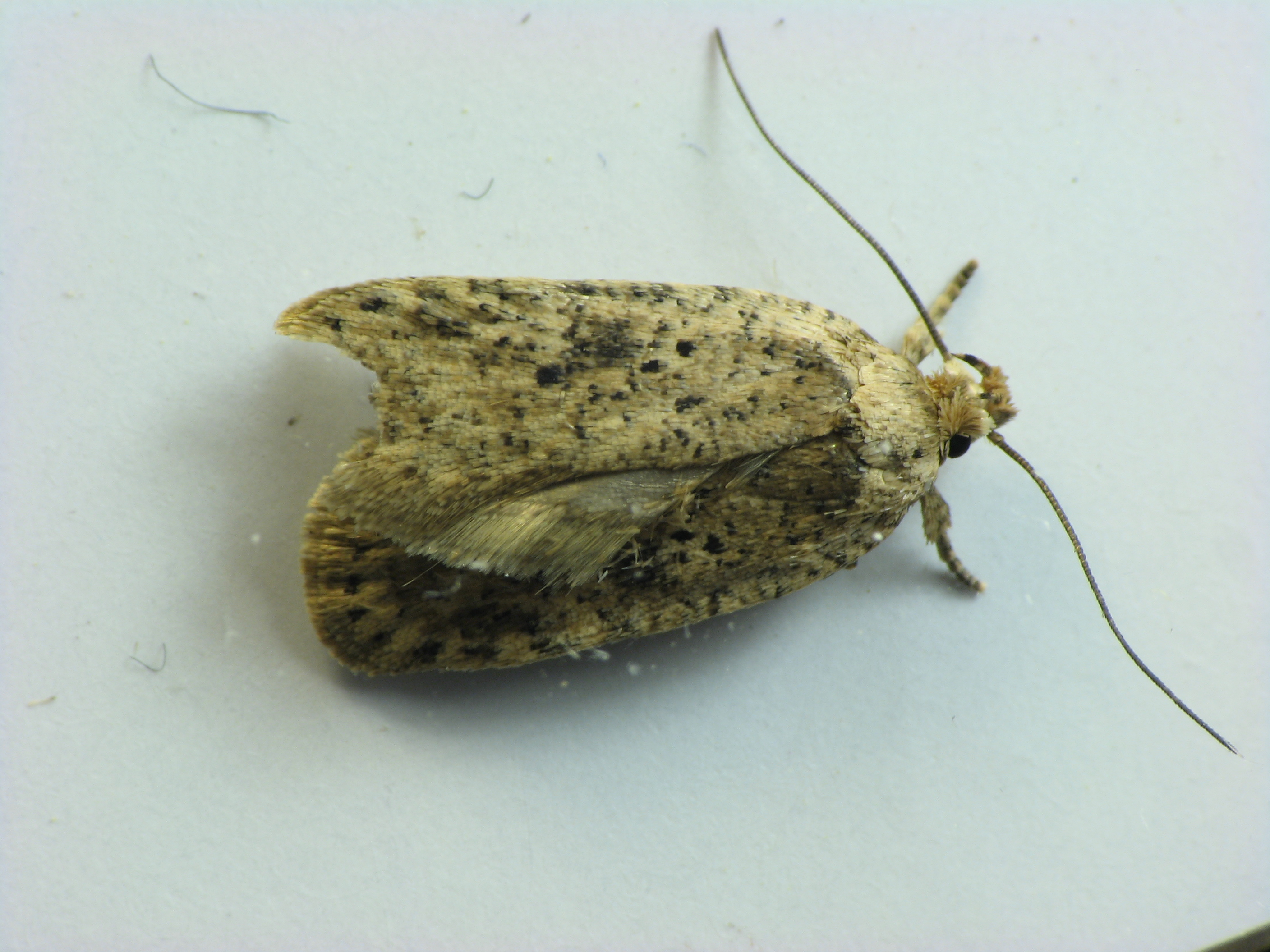
- Agonopterix senicionella

Scientific classification
- Kingdom: Animalia
- Phylum: Arthropoda
- Clade: Pancrustacea
- Class: Insecta
- Order: Lepidoptera
- Superfamily: Gelechioidea
- Family: Depressariidae; Meyrick, 1883

= Depressariidae =

Family of moths

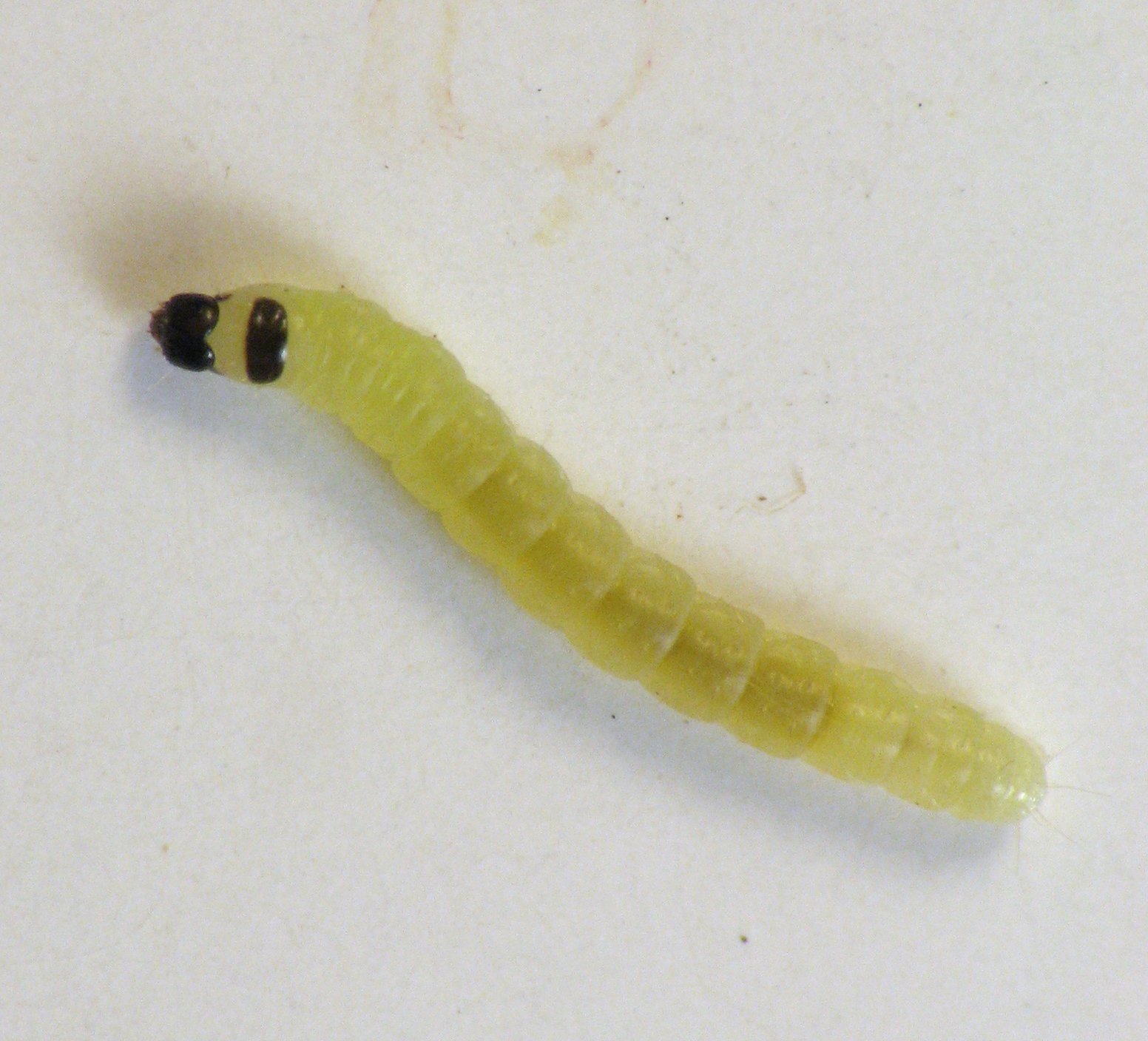
Agonopterix senicionella caterpillar

Depressariidae is a family of moths. It was formerly treated as a subfamily of Gelechiidae, but is now recognised as a separate family, comprising about 2,300 species worldwide.

== Subfamilies ==
Depressariidae consists of ten subfamilies:

- Acriinae
- Aeolanthinae
- Cryptolechiinae
- Depressariinae
- Ethmiinae
- Hypercalliinae
- Hypertrophinae
- Oditinae
- Peleopodinae
- Stenomatinae

A number of genera, including Carcina, Gonionota, Machimia, Himmacia (sensu stricto), and Psilocorsis, are not placed in a subfamily.
