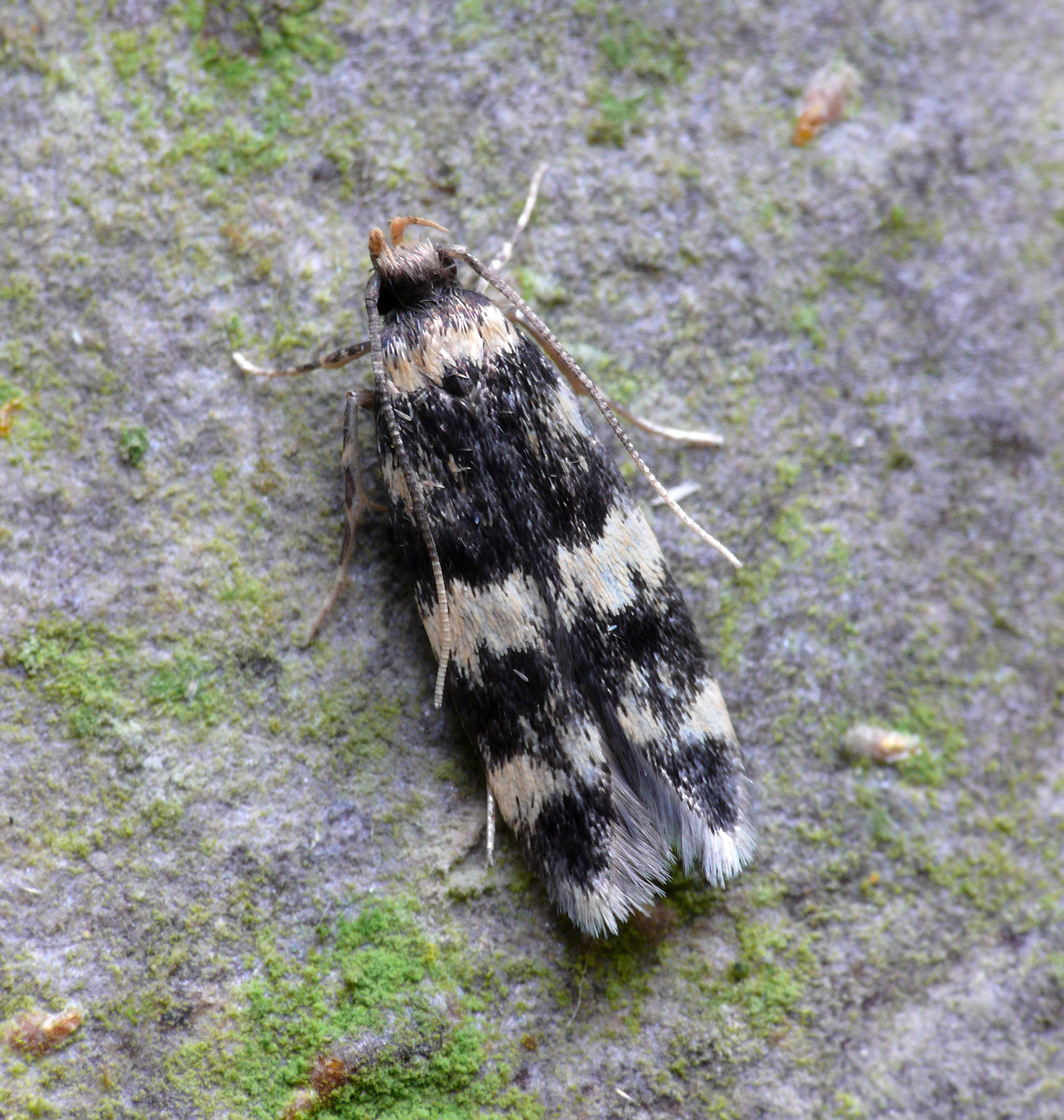
- Oegoconia quadripuncta

Scientific classification
- Domain: Eukaryota
- Kingdom: Animalia
- Phylum: Arthropoda
- Class: Insecta
- Order: Lepidoptera
- Superfamily: Gelechioidea
- Family: Autostichidae; Le Marchand, 1947

Genera
- See text.

= Autostichidae =

Family of moths

Autostichidae is a family of moths in the moth superfamily Gelechioidea.

== Subfamilies ==
- Autostichinae Le Marchand, 1947
- Deocloninae Hodges, 1998
- Glyphidocerinae Hodges, 1998
- Holcopogoninae Gozmány, 1967
- Oegoconiinae Leraut, 1992
- Symmocinae Gozmány, 1957
