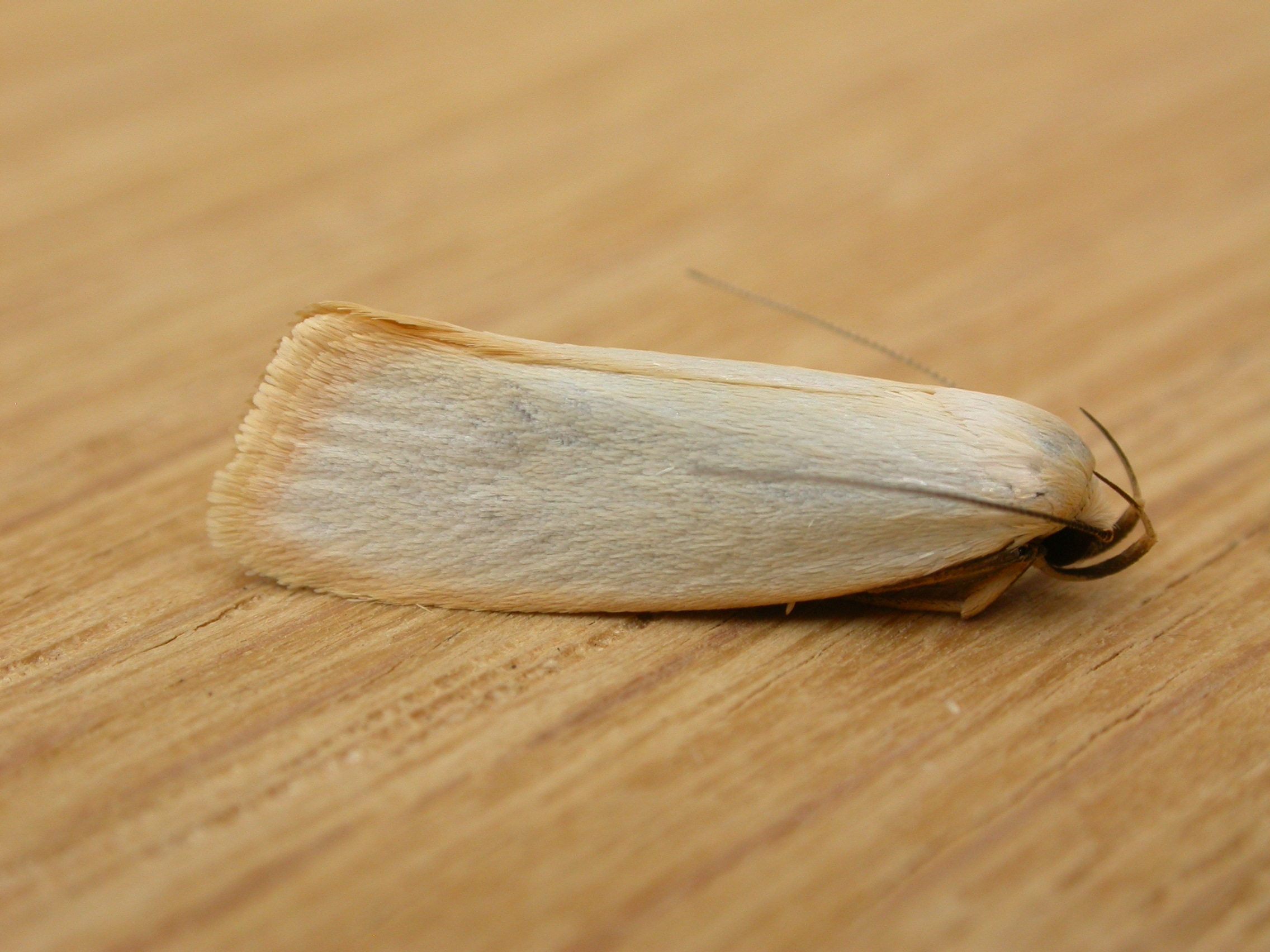
- Adult Xylorycta assimilis of the Xyloryctidae, photographed in Aranda (Australia); Note prominent "horns" and long antennae

Scientific classification
- Domain: Eukaryota
- Kingdom: Animalia
- Phylum: Arthropoda
- Class: Insecta
- Order: Lepidoptera
- Clade: Apoditrysia
- Superfamily: Gelechioidea; Fracker, 1915

Diversity
- 16-21 families (see text)

= Gelechioidea =

Curved-horn moths

Superfamily of moths

Gelechioidea (from the type genus Gelechia, "keeping to the ground") is the superfamily of moths that contains the case-bearers, twirler moths, and relatives, also simply called curved-horn moths or gelechioid moths. It is a large and poorly understood '"micromoth" superfamily, constituting one of the basal lineages of the Ditrysia.

As of the 1990s, this superfamily was composed of about 1,425 genera and 16,250 species. It was estimated that only 25% of the species diversity of Gelechioidea had been described. If this estimate is accurate, Gelechioidea will be one of the largest superfamilies of Lepidoptera.

The name "curved-horn moths" refers to one of the few conspicuous features found in (almost) all Gelechioidea, and, at least in the more extreme developments, unique to them: the labial palps are well-developed (though not thickened), and form more or less gently curved protrusions whose end has a drawn-out, pointed tip. Their proboscis is generally well-developed, allowing for long-lived imagines (adults); the proximal part of the proboscis is scaly. Otherwise, the Gelechioidea vary extensively in habitus; most have small hind-wings with long, hairy fringes, though these are not easily seen in the living animal as they are tucked under the fore-wings at rest. The body is usually quite compressed, either dorsoventrally or laterally.

== Families ==
The phylogeny and classification of the Gelechioidea remains a subject of considerable dispute. For example, the Elachistidae were at one time used as a sort of "wastebin taxon" to unite as subfamilies a variety of plesiomorphic members of this superfamily, which do not actually seem to form a monophyletic group. Many of these have now been moved to the Oecophoridae, but others are almost certainly likely families in their own right, while additional ones may well be so.

In 2011 the superfamily was divided into 21 families, based mainly on morphological studies, with adjustments made for some molecular studies. The number of genera and an estimate of the species number are given in parentheses.

- Autostichidae Le Marchand, 1947 (72 genera, 638 species) – includes Deocloninae, Glyphidocerinae, Holcopogoninae, Symmocinae and Metachandini, which have sometimes been treated as families.
- Batrachedridae Heinemann & Wocke, 1876 (10 genera, 99 species)
- Blastobasidae Meyrick, 1894 (24 genera, 377 species) – previously considered a subfamily of Coleophoridae.
- Chimabachidae Heinemann, 1870 (2 genera, 6 species)
- Coelopoetidae Hodges, 1978 (1 genus, 3 species)
- Coleophoridae Bruand, 1850 (case-bearers, case moths; 5 genera, 1,386 species)
- Cosmopterigidae Heinemann & Wocke, 1876 (cosmet moths; 135 genera, 1,792 species)
- Elachistidae Bruand, 1850 (grass-miner moths; 161 genera, 3,201 species) – includes Agonoxeninae (palm moths) and Ethmiinae, which have sometimes been treated as families.
- Epimarptidae Meyrick, 1914 (1 genus, 4 species) – previously considered a subfamily of Batrachedridae.
- Gelechiidae Stainton, 1854 (twirler moths; 500 genera, 4,700 species)
- Lecithoceridae Le Marchand, 1947 (long-horned moths; 100 genera, 1,200 species)
- Lypusidae Herrich-Schäffer, 1857 (3 genera, 21 species)
- Momphidae Herrich-Schäffer, 1857 (mompha moths; 6 genera, 115 species) – previously considered a subfamily of Coleophoridae.
- Oecophoridae Bruand, 1850 (concealer moths; 313 genera, 3,308 species)
- Peleopodidae Hodges, 1974 (7 genera, 28 species)
- Pterolonchidae Meyrick, 1918 (2 genera, 8 species) – previously considered a subfamily of Coleophoridae.
- Schistonoeidae Hodges, 1998 (scavenger moth; 1 genus, 1 species)
- Scythrididae Rebel, 1901 (flower moths; 30 genera, 669 species) – previously considered a subfamily of Xyloryctidae.
- Stathmopodidae Janse, 1917 (44 genera, 408 species) – previously considered a subfamily of Oecophoridae.
- Syringopaidae Hodges, 1998 (1 genus, 1 species) – previously considered a subfamily of Deoclonidae.
- Xyloryctidae Meyrick, 1890 (60 genera, 524 species)

However, a later phylogenetic analysis of the Gelechioidea, using a morphological and molecular dataset, proposed a revision into 16 families, with the status of two further families, Schistonoeidae and Epimarptidae, unclear.

- Autostichidae Le Marchand, 1947
  - Autostichinae Le Marchand, 1947
  - Deocloninae Hodges, 1999
  - Glyphidocerinae Hodges, 1999
  - Holcopogoninae Gozmány, 1967
  - Oegoconiinae Leraut, 1992
  - Symmocinae Gozmány, 1957
- Batrachedridae Heinemann & Wocke, 1876
- Blastobasidae Meyrick, 1894
  - Blastobasinae Meyrick, 1894
  - Holcocerinae Adamski, 1989
- Coleophoridae Bruand, 1850
- Cosmopterigidae Heinemann in Heinemann & Wocke, 1876
  - Antequerinae Hodges, 1978
  - Chrysopeleiinae Mosher, 1916
  - Cosmopteriginae Heinemann and Wocke, 1876
  - Scaeosophinae Meyrick, 1922
- Depressariidae Meyrick, 1883
  - Acriinae Kuznetsov and Stekolnikov, 1984
  - Aeolanthinae Kuznetsov and Stekolnikov, 1984
  - Cryptolechiinae Meyrick, 1883
  - Depressariinae Meyrick, 1883
  - Ethmiinae Busck, 1909
  - Hypercalliinae Leraut, 1993
  - Hypertrophinae Fletcher, 1929
  - Oditinae Lvovsky, 1996
  - Peleopodinae Hodges, 1974
  - Stenomatinae Meyrick, 1906
- Elachistidae Bruand, 1850 – substantially reduced with movement of five subfamilies to Depressariidae.
  - Agonoxeninae Meyrick, 1926
  - Elachistinae Bruand, 1850
  - Parametriotinae Capuse, 1971
- Gelechiidae Stainton, 1854
  - Anacampsinae Bruand, 1850
  - Anomologinae Meyrick, 1926
  - Apatetrinae Meyrick, 1947
  - Dichomeridinae Hampson, 1918
  - Gelechiinae Stainton, 1854
  - Physoptilinae Meyrick, 1914
  - Thiotrichinae Karsholt et al., 2013
- Lecithoceridae Le Marchand, 1947
  - Ceuthomadarinae Gozmány, 1978
  - Lecithocerinae Le Marchand, 1947
  - Torodorinae Gozmány, 1978
- Lypusidae Herrich-Schäffer, 1857
  - Chimabachinae Heinemann, 1870
  - Lypusinae Herrich-Schäffer, 1857
- Momphidae Herrich-Schäffer, 1857
- Oecophoridae Bruand, 1850
  - Oecophorinae Bruand, 1850
  - Pleurotinae Toll, 1956
- Pterolonchidae Meyrick, 1918
  - Coelopoetinae Hodges, 1978
  - Pterolonchinae Meyrick, 1918
  - Syringopainae Hodges, 1999
- Scythrididae Rebel, 1901
- Stathmopodidae Meyrick, 1913
- Xyloryctidae Meyrick, 1890
