= Coelopoeta phaceliae =

Scientific classification
- Kingdom: Animalia
- Phylum: Arthropoda
- Class: Insecta
- Order: Lepidoptera
- Family: Pterolonchidae
- Genus: Coelopoeta
- Species: C. phaceliae

Binomial name
- Coelopoeta phaceliae Kaila, 1995

Species of moth

Coelopoeta phaceliae is a moth in the superfamily Gelechioidea. It is found in the US state of California.

== Taxonomy ==
The species was described in 1995 by Lauri Kaila. The holotype is a male reared by R. E. Dietz and P. A. Opler from a caterpillar (J. Powell 70F95) collected on Fandango Pass, Modoc County, at 6,100 feet (1,900 m) elevation, on 12 or 13 June 1970, which emerged from its cocoon on 7 July (of the same year), although specimens are known to have been collected since at least 1962. It is kept at the Essig Museum of Entomology, University of California, Berkeley.

== Description ==
The length of the forewings is 4.5–6 mm. The ground color of the forewings is ochreous, densely mottled, mostly with brown scales. The hindwings are gray. The larvae are undescribed in the original description.

== Distribution ==
Coelopoeta phaceliae would appear to be endemic to California, occurring from central to northern parts of the state, with specimens having been collected from Fandango Pass in Modoc County, the San Bruno Mountains in San Mateo County, nine miles east of McCloud in Siskiyou County, and three miles northwest of Portola and one mile south of Meadow Valley in Plumas County.

It appears to be sympatric with C. glutinosi.

== Ecology ==
It has been collected at altitudes of 3,500–6,100 feet (1,100–1,900 m). Moths reared from collected larvae have emerged from their cocoon from 7 May to 23 July.

The larvae have been reared from Phacelia species, including P. californica, P. hastata × mutabilis, P. procera and P. mutabilis. They mine the leaves of their host plant.
