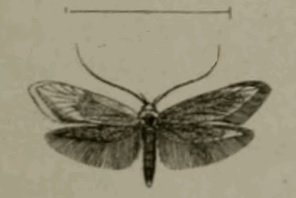

Scientific classification
- Kingdom: Animalia
- Phylum: Arthropoda
- Clade: Pancrustacea
- Class: Insecta
- Order: Lepidoptera
- Family: Autostichidae
- Genus: Syringopais
- Species: S. temperatella

Binomial name
- Syringopais temperatella (Lederer, 1855)

Synonyms
- Oecophora temperatella Lederer, 1855; Scythris temperatella (Lederer, 1855); Nochelodes temperatella (Lederer, 1855); Oecophora fuscofasciata Stainton, 1867; Butalis ochrolitella Staudinger, 1871; Nochelodes xenicopa Meyrick, 1920

= Syringopais temperatella =

Species of moth

Syringopais temperatella, the cereal leaf miner or wheat leaf miner, is a very small sized moth of the family Pterolonchidae. It is found on Cyprus and in Greece and the Near East. It is an important pest in cereal grain fields in some areas.

== Taxonomy ==
It was first described in 1855 by Julius Lederer as Oecophora temperatella, from two males collected by Franz Zach in Beirut in Lebanon. These are the syntypes. The first female was collected in Palestine as a single specimen and described as a different species, O. fuscofasciata, by Henry Tibbats Stainton in his Tineina of Syria and Asia Minor of 1867. Stainton also mentions examining and coming across specimens of O. temperatella from Palestine, and that he was "strongly disposed to think that this is the female of O. temperatella". A rather damaged female specimen collected in "Smyrna" (İzmir), Turkey, was described as the synonym Butalis ochrolitella by Otto Staudinger in 1871. Staudinger also mentions that the specimen might be the female counterpart to Lederer's Oecophora temperatella.

The species was moved to the monotypic genus Syringopais by Erich Martin Hering in 1919. Hering synonymised Butalis ochrolitella and Oecophora fuscofasciata with Syringopais temperatella in the same paper. Edward Meyrick then re-described the same species as the synonym Nochelodes xenicopa in 1920 from a single male specimen collected in Nazareth, Palestine, by Barraud in April.

It has been classified in the genus Scythris as S. temperatella before the 1920s, at least in German sources. In the early 1920s it was also known as Nochelodes temperatella in Cyprus, at least in British sources.

=== Etymology ===
Lederer does not state why he chose the specific epithet "temperatella".

=== Intergeneric classification ===
Meyrick included it in the Oecophoridae in 1920 (as Nochelodes xenicopa). In 1999 Ronald W. Hodges was the first to classify this moth in its own monotypic subfamily, the Syringopainae, which he classified in the family Deoclonidae.

In Zhi-Qiang Zhang's 2011 attempt to number all the known animal species of Earth, van Nieukerken et al., the authors of the section on Lepidoptera, recognised the Syringopaidae as an independent, monotypic family within the Gelechioidea superfamily.

It has also been placed in the Gelechiidae (in 2013), as well as the subfamily Deocloninae of the family Autostichidae.

In 2014 the moth was placed in the subfamily Syringopainae of the family Pterolonchidae following a cladistics analysis by Heikkilä et al.

== Description ==
The species is sexually dimorphic. The male is decidedly larger than the female, especially regarding wingspan.

The length of the body is 12-15mm. The fore-wings are shiny greenish-yellow and the hind-wings are ash-grey. The head and back of the abdomen are brownish-yellow. There are appressed scales on the head. The tongue is developed. The labial palpi are long, curved upwards, slender, with smooth scales on the second joint, and the last segment almost as long as the second, and ending in an acute point, while the maxillary palpi are very short, thread-like and appressed to the tongue.

The larvae, or caterpillars, are pale or yellow-pink with a dark brown head, and covered with many tubercles. They grow to 10mm.

=== Similar species ===
In his original description, Lederer compares it to Crassa tinctella, of which it is about the same size. In his re-analysis Hering compares it to Scythris cuspidella, considering the genus Scythris the most closely resembling group to this odd moth, but remarks on the very different wing venation, the fore-wings having more and more pronounced veins, the hind-wings somewhat less but more pronounced veins, as well as differences in the genitalia. Meyrick mentions a resemblance to the genus Promalactis. The adults can be found with similar moths in the genus Pleurota in May in Turkey, but are said to be easily distinguished by the "naked and curved palpus labialis".

== Distribution ==
It is found in the European Union on Cyprus and in Greece, and it is also found in Asia in the Near East in southern Turkey, Lebanon, Israel, Palestine, Lorestan in Iran, Iraq (both in lowlands as well as highlands), Jordan and perhaps elsewhere.

== Ecology ==
The larvae feed on Hordeum, barley, and Triticum, wheat, species. It has also been found more rarely on oats, Avena sativa. They are thought to likely be native to grassy places in degraded oak woodland habitat, and mountain steppe in rocky places, but to have adapted to human grain fields over the ages.

The caterpillars mine the leaves of their host plant. After hatching in the early summer, the young larvae feed for a while before entering the soil, spinning a special cocoon called a "cyst", and entering summer diapause. Mining larvae can be found in winter and early spring. Pupation and overwintering takes place in the soil.

The imagoes, the adults, have a very weak flight ability, and flutter low among the grasses. They are active day and night in May in southern Turkey. Adult moths are active from late spring to early summer in Cyprus. The males have been observed feeding diurnally on the nectar of clover, Trifolium, flowers. Both males and females have been observed on clover in Israel, with four times as many females appearing than males. There is a single annual generation. The eggs are laid in the soil before the heat of summer, with females laying 50-120 eggs each on or in the soil.

=== Parasitoids ===
A number of parasitoids have recently been recorded from this species, from southeast Turkey Habrobracon stabilis and a species of Apanteles, and the eulophid wasps Diglyphus chabrias, Necremnus tidius and Sympiesis euspilapterygis from Lorestan in Iran. In Israel caterpillars collected in a field of durum wheat were reared in the laboratory and the following parasitoids were all raised from them: Eulophidae (Cirrospilus vittatus, Diglyphus chabrias, D. isaea, D. sensilis, D. pusztensis, Necremnus tidius, Neochrysocharis formosus, Pnigalio gyamiensis, P. pectinicornis), Pteromalidae (Norbanus sp.), Braconidae (Habrobracon stabilis, Apanteles sp.); and Ichneumonidae (Campoplex sp.). In all of these species the parasitoids emerged significantly earlier than the moths. Most species of ectoparasitoids hatched ahead of the endoparasitoids. Male moths emerge slightly earlier from their cocoons than the females, and are significantly more often infected, with a higher mortality. Parasitoids may cause up to 50% mortality in the moth population.

== Uses ==
These moths are important pests of cereals in Cyprus, Turkey, Jordan and elsewhere. In 2013 in Jordan, Al-Zyoud states that the "pest has been recognized since 2001 as the most destructive insect pest limiting the production of wheat and barley". It was a major agricultural pest in Cyprus in the mid-1920s, when "sometimes whole areas of wheat are virtually destroyed". It remained a pest in Cyrus in the 1970s. In Turkey crop losses of up to 60% have been reported, and higher in Jordan. It is also reported as a pest in Lorestan in Iran, and in Iraq in the 1950s. Drought years cause worse damage from this pest.

Insecticides were considered the most effective control method (in Cyprus in 1977) provided the timing of the spraying was carried out at the right times in the development of the insect. Organophosphates are the most effective to date, destroying 90-100% of the pest when applied early. In some countries the moth has begun to develop a resistance to some pesticides.

Mechanical methods of control are deep ploughing to 40 cm to expose the cocoons, crop rotation with legumes, burning crop stubble and leaving the soil fallow for at least two years.

Some research has gone into biological control. Trials with formulations containing the insecticidal bacterium Bacillus thuringiensis have shown up to 80% reduction of the infestation in wheat in Jordan. Several strains of barley appear resistant, and there is some breeding being done in various countries to explore this trait.
