= Anthony Valletta =

Maltese Natrulist

Anthony Valletta (21 December 1908 – 8 December 1988 in Birkirkara, Malta) was a well known teacher, lepidopterist and naturalist. He was a Fellow of the Royal Entomological Society. He wrote several books on nature in the Maltese Islands, such as Know the Trees and Know the Birds. He also discovered a sub-species of moth which has been named after him - Pterolonche vallettae. His collection of butterflies and insects was the largest in Malta. He was one of the first people in Malta to start a public consciousness to protect the island's environmental heritage.

He was a headteacher at three state schools, in Luqa, Għaxaq and Birkirkara and later an inspector of government schools for the Department of Education. Birkirkara Primary School was named after him.

== Published books ==
- Know the birds (1954)
- Know the wild flowers (1955)
- Know the trees (1959)
- The butterflies of the Maltese Islands (1971)
- The moths of the Maltese Islands (1972)
- Mit-tfulija man-natura (Since childhood with nature) - an autobiography (1983)
