= Coelopoeta maiadella =

Scientific classification
- Kingdom: Animalia
- Phylum: Arthropoda
- Class: Insecta
- Order: Lepidoptera
- Family: Pterolonchidae
- Genus: Coelopoeta
- Species: C. maiadella

Binomial name
- Coelopoeta maiadella Kaila, 1995

Species of moth

Coelopoeta maiadella is a moth in the superfamily Gelechioidea. It is found in Yukon, Canada.

The species was described in 1995 by Lauri Kaila from a single specimen from Yukon, Canada. The only specimen known was a male collected in a light trap on 16 July 1985 by K. Mikkola. This specimen, the holotype, is kept at the Zoological Museum, University of Helsinki, Finland. The females, caterpillars and host plants of this species remain unknown.

The forewings are grey and are roughly 5mm.
