= Homaledra sabalella =

Scientific classification
- Kingdom: Animalia
- Phylum: Arthropoda
- Clade: Pancrustacea
- Class: Insecta
- Order: Lepidoptera
- Family: Pterolonchidae
- Genus: Homaledra
- Species: H. sabalella

Binomial name
- Homaledra sabalella (Chambers, 1880)

Synonyms
- Laverna sabalella Chambers, 1880

Moth species in family Batrachedridae

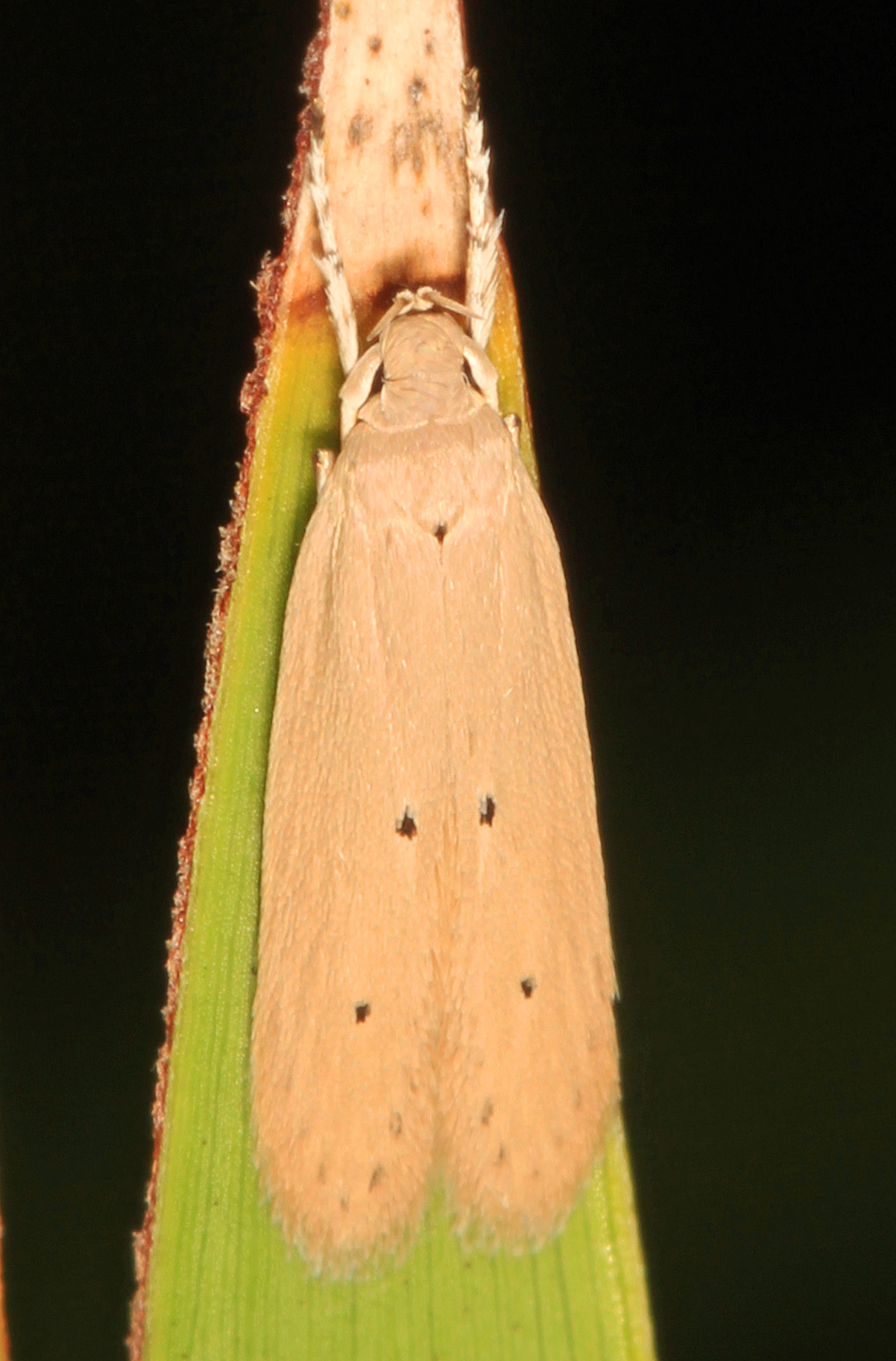
A palm Leaf Skeletonizer in Everglades National park

Homaledra sabalella, the palm leaf skeletonizer moth, is a moth in the family Pterolonchidae. It is found in North America, where it has been recorded from Alabama, Florida, Mississippi, South Carolina and Texas. It is also present in Puerto Rico, Hispaniola and Cuba.

== Taxonomy ==
Homaledra sabalella was described as Laverna sabalella by Vactor Tousey Chambers in 1880. It was included in the family Coleophoridae by Ron Hodges in 1983. Hodges then moved it to the subfamily Batrachedrinae of the Batrachedridae in 1999. In 2014, a cladistic analysis performed by Heikkilä et al., which led them to decide it was better to reclassify the genus in the family Pterolonchidae.

== Description ==
The wingspan is about 18 mm. Adults mature and are active year-round.

== Ecology ==
The larvae feed on Sabal palmetto, Sabal causiarum and Cocos nucifera. They feed on the palm fronds.
