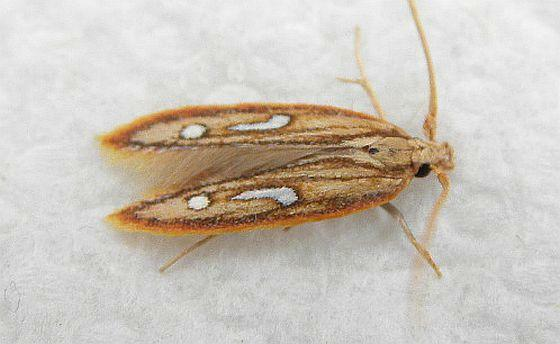

Scientific classification
- Kingdom: Animalia
- Phylum: Arthropoda
- Clade: Pancrustacea
- Class: Insecta
- Order: Lepidoptera
- Family: Pterolonchidae
- Genus: Homaledra
- Species: H. heptathalama

Binomial name
- Homaledra heptathalama Busck, 1900

= Homaledra heptathalama =

Moth species in family Batrachedridae

Homaledra heptathalama, the exclamation moth or palm leaf housemaker, is a moth in the family Pterolonchidae. It was described by August Busck in 1900. It is found in the United States, where it has been recorded from Alabama, Florida and South Carolina.

== Taxonomy ==
It was first described in 1900 by August Busck using specimens from Palm Beach, Florida. It was included in the family Coleophoridae by Ron Hodges in 1983. Hodges then moved it to the subfamily Batrachedrinae of the Batrachedridae in 1999. In 2014, a cladistic analysis performed by Heikkilä et al., made them decide it was necessary to reclassify the genus in the family Pterolonchidae.
