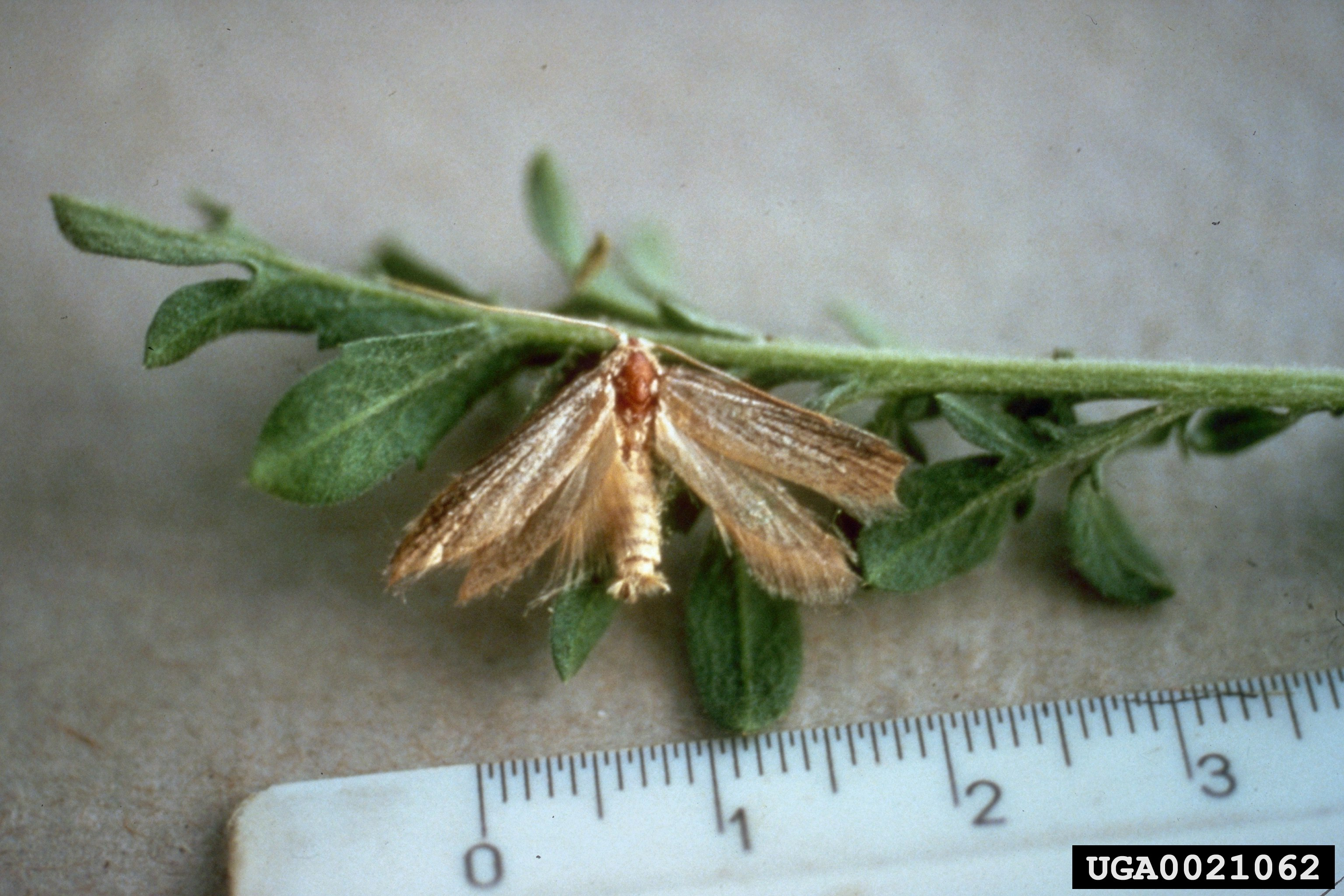

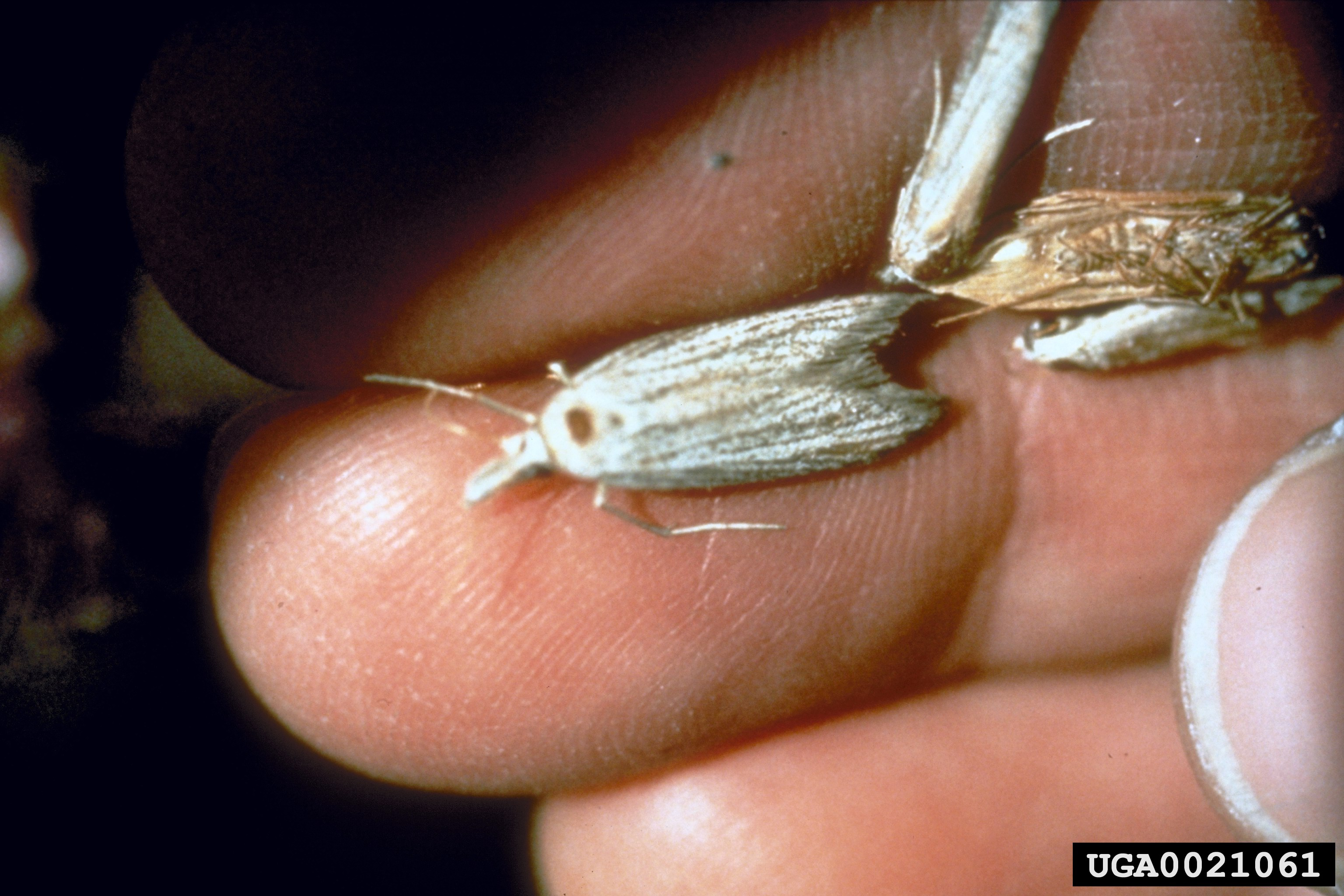

Scientific classification
- Kingdom: Animalia
- Phylum: Arthropoda
- Clade: Pancrustacea
- Class: Insecta
- Order: Lepidoptera
- Family: Pterolonchidae
- Genus: Pterolonche
- Species: P. inspersa

Binomial name
- Pterolonche inspersa Staudinger, 1859

Synonyms
- Pterolonche benesignata Rebel, 1914; Pterolonche gracilis Rebel, 1916

= Pterolonche inspersa =

Species of moth

Pterolonche inspersa, sometimes called the brown-winged knapweed root moth, is a small moth of the family Pterolonchidae.

== Taxonomy ==
The type specimen was collected in Chiclana de la Frontera, Andalucia, Spain. Pterolonche benesignata was described from Lower Egypt by Hans Rebel in 1914. The taxon P. gracilis, described by Rebel in 1916 from Crete, was synonymised to this species by Antonio Vives Moreno in 1987. In the same publication Vives placed it in his new subgenus Pterolonche.

== Description ==
The wingspan is about 20 mm, the body length is about 7 mm. Adults are light-brown without distinct markings.

The eggs are oval and black.

== Distribution ==
Pterolonche inspersa is found in Portugal, Spain, France, Italy, Sardinia, Sicily, the Czech Republic, Slovakia, Hungary, Bulgaria, Greece, Crete, Turkey, Egypt and Morocco. It has been found throughout most of Spain and Portugal. Introduced populations have been recorded as established in Idaho (United States) and British Columbia (Canada).

== Ecology ==
In Spain there are usually two generations per year. There is one generation per year in introduced populations in the northwestern United States. Adults, the imagoes, have a lifespan of only 15 to 20 days. In the US the imagoes emerge from their cocoons in June to early September. One or a small group of eggs are laid on the lower surface of the base leaves of the rosette of the host plant.

The larvae feed on Centaurea species, including C. diffusa and C. maculosa. The silken tube studded plants can be recognized as infested in the spring. The roots become spongy and plant rosettes are easily pulled from the ground.

P. inspersa larvae are known to eat the larvae of the bronze knapweed root beetle, Sphenoptera jugoslavica.

== Uses ==
It was released as a biological control agent for knapweed, Centaurea species, in Colorado, Montana, and Oregon in 1986, or 1988. Although there was no establishment of the species in the United States initially, as of 2011 it was recorded as established in Idaho and British Columbia (Canada), ten years after introduction of the species.

== Gallery ==
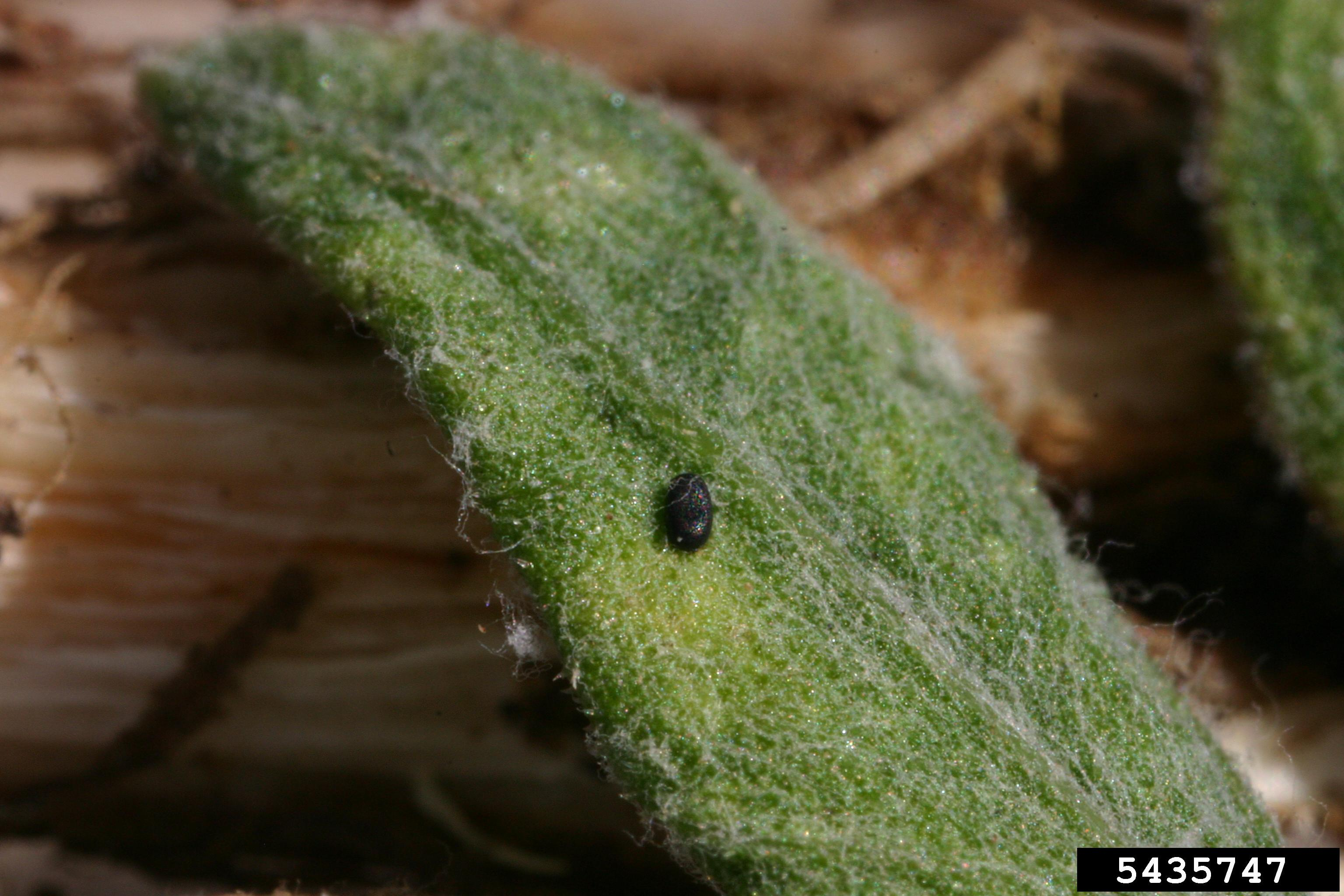
Eggs

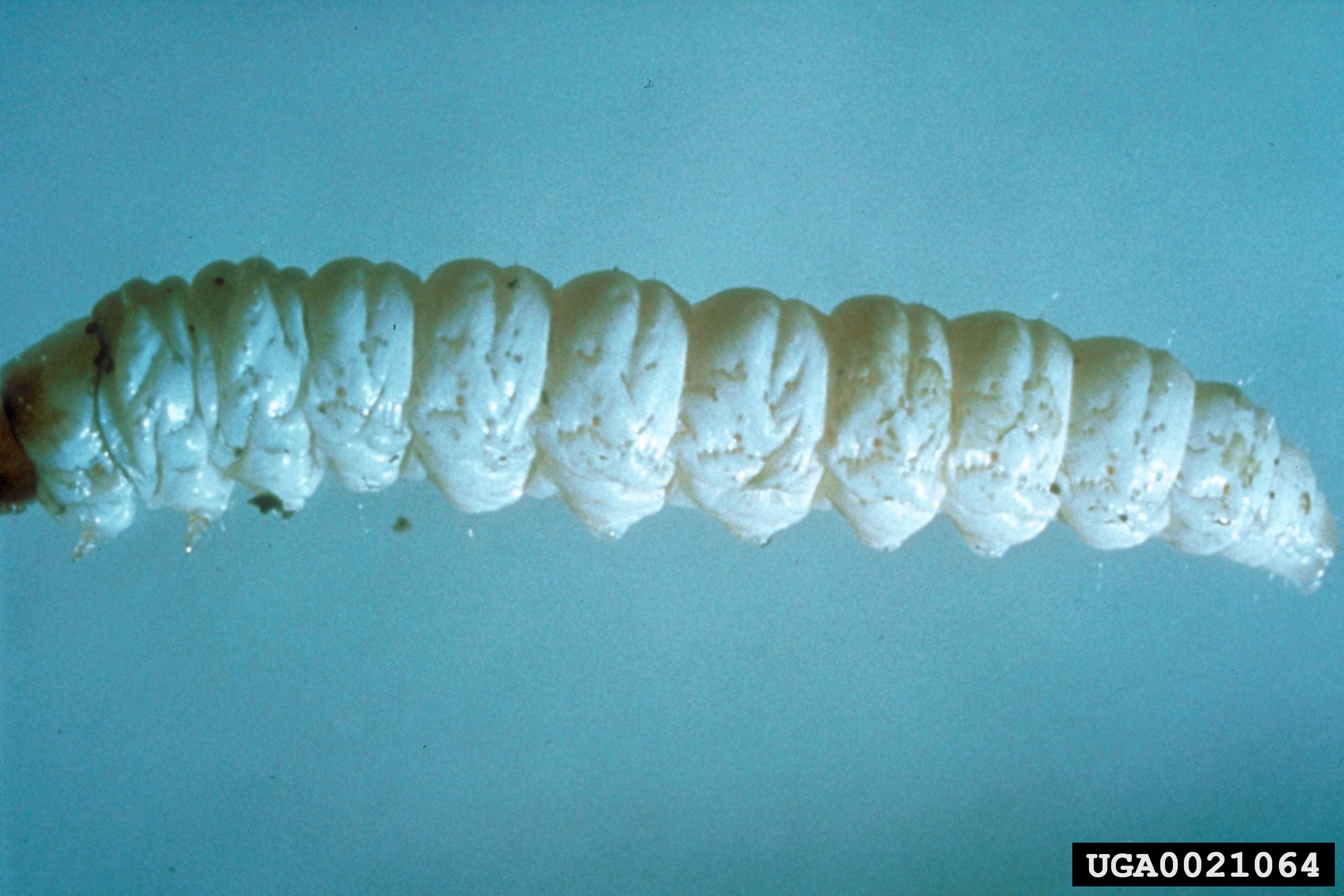
Larva

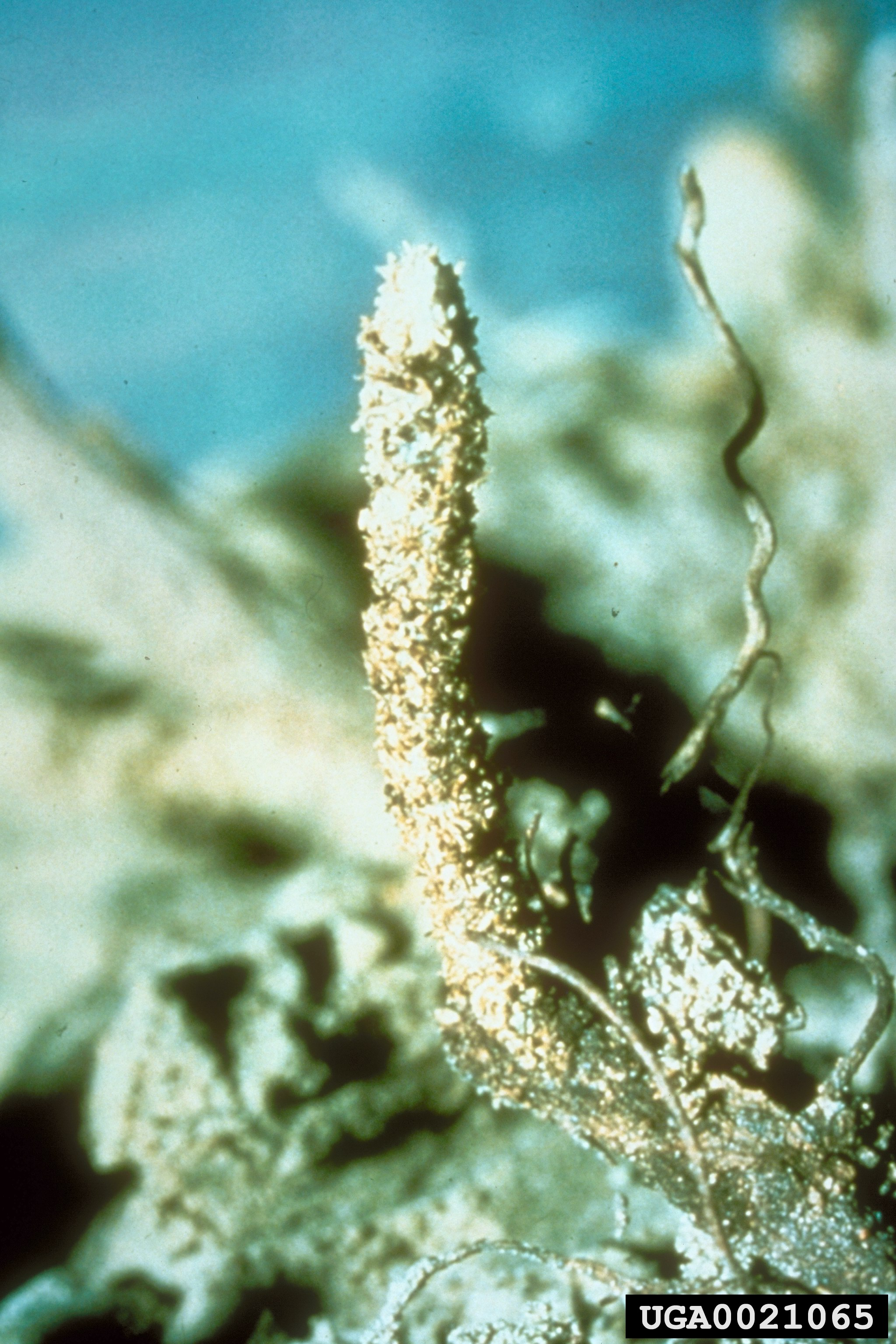
Larva

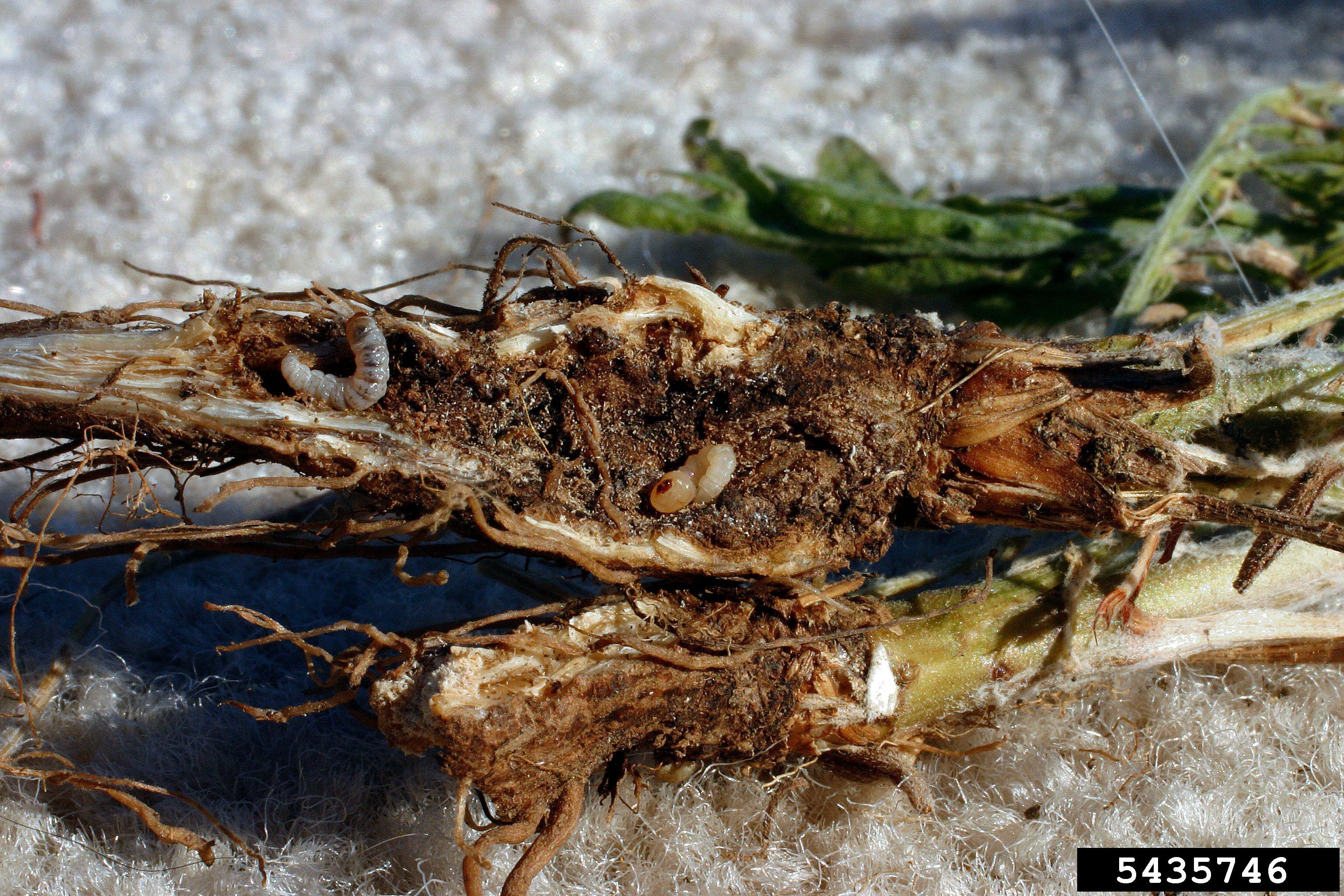
Larva

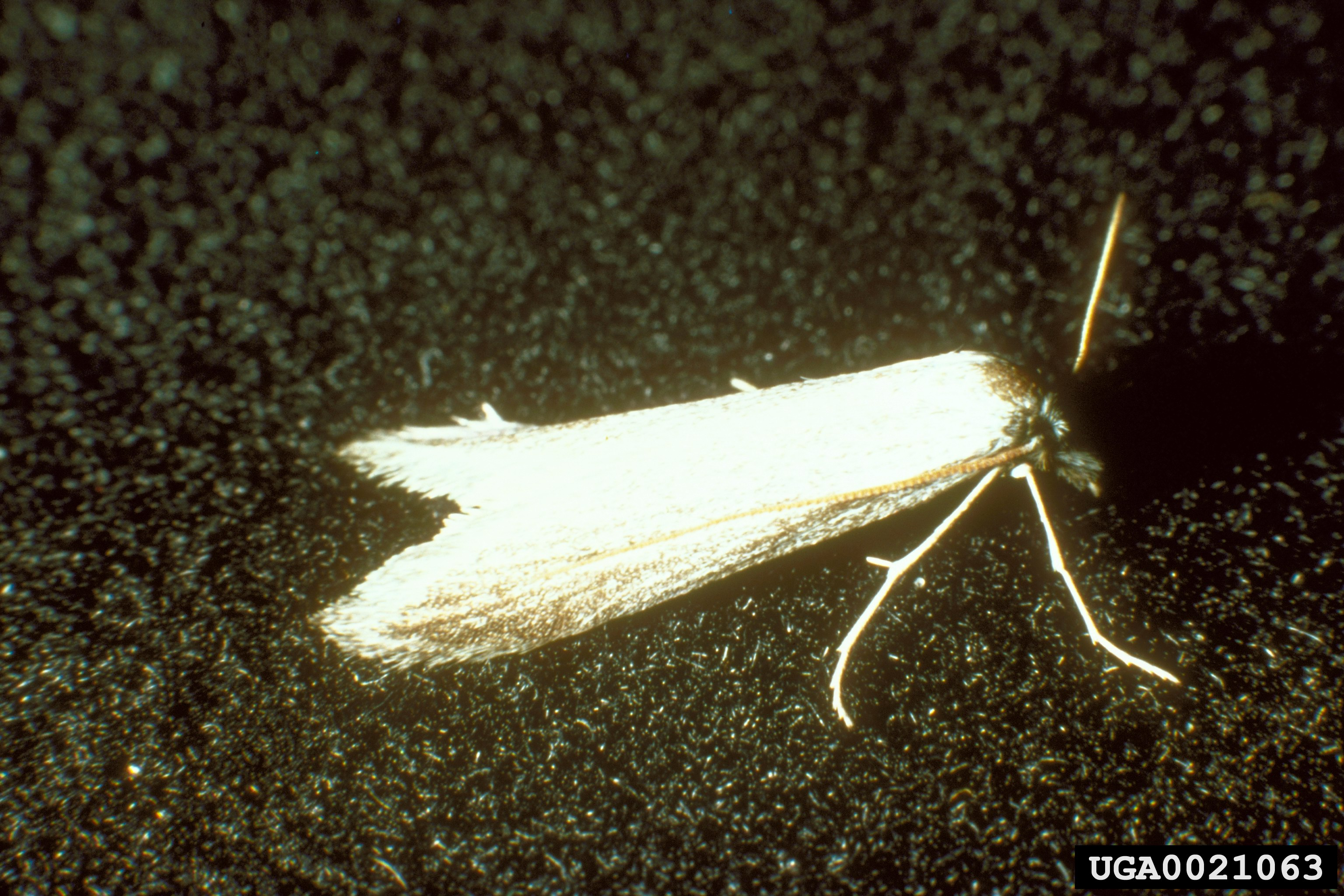
Adult
