= Coelopoeta glutinosi =

Scientific classification
- Domain: Eukaryota
- Kingdom: Animalia
- Phylum: Arthropoda
- Class: Insecta
- Order: Lepidoptera
- Family: Pterolonchidae
- Genus: Coelopoeta
- Species: C. glutinosi

Binomial name
- Coelopoeta glutinosi Walsingham, 1907

Synonyms
- Coelopoeta baldella W.T. Barnes & Busck, 1920

Species of moth

Coelopoeta glutinosi is a tiny species of moth in the superfamily Gelechioidea. It is found in California in the United States.

== Taxonomy ==
The species C. glutinosi was first described in 1907 from specimens from California by Thomas de Grey, 6th Baron Walsingham, who placed it within his new monotypic genus Coelopoeta. This species is therefore the type species for the genus.

A second species from California was described in 1920 by William Barnes and August Busck, C. baldella, based on supposed colour differences, This new taxon was then synonymised with C. glutinosi by Annette F. Braun in 1948 due to the two insect species being morphologically identical and found on the same food plants, which rendered the genus monotypic again. This synonymy was upheld by Ronald W. Hodges in 1983, Lauri Kaila in 1995, and van Nieukerken et al. in 2011. In 1995 Lauri Kaila described two new species in the genus.

=== Etymology ===
Lord Walsingham chose the specific epithet glutinosi to refer to the plant species that he thought his specimens were collected on, Eriodictyon glutinosum, which Braun stated was most likely E. californicum.

=== Types ===
Lord Walsingham described the new species from a type series, including both males and females, that had been collected from the five northern Californian counties: Mendocino, Lake, Colusa, Shasta and Siskiyou (note county boundaries may have changed since his time). It is kept at the Natural History Museum, London, with paratypes kept at the National Museum of Natural History of the Smithsonian Institution.

The holotype for C. baldella, genitalia slide No. 87422, is a male kept at the National Museum of Natural History. It was collected at a place called "Camp Baldy" in the San Bernardino Mountains.

=== Supergeneric classification ===
Lord Walsingham placed the genus in the family Hyponomeutidae in 1907. The genus was first moved to the family Elachistidae by Barnes and Busck in their 1920 paper. Ronald W. Hodges classified it in his new subfamily Coelopoetinae, in the Elachistidae, in 1978. It was briefly placed in the subfamily Oecophorinae of the Oecophoridae by Brown et al. in 2004. In 2011 it was recognised as an independent family in its own right, as the Coelopoetidae, by van Nieukerken et al., only for it to be moved into the subfamily Coelopoetinae of the family Pterolonchidae a few years later following a cladistics analysis by Heikkilä et al. in 2014.

== Distribution ==
This moth species has been recorded throughout California, from the far north to the far south.

== Ecology ==
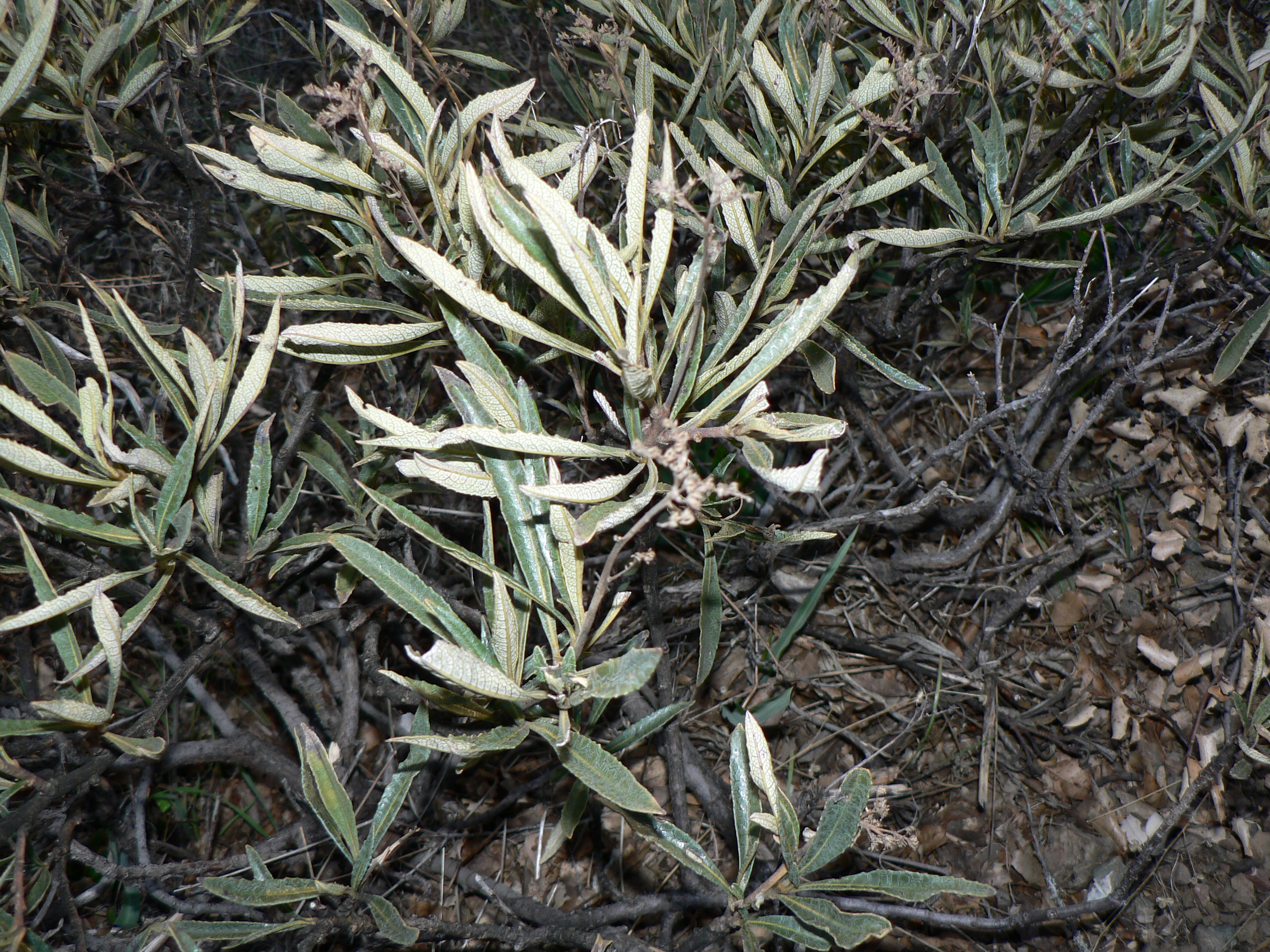
Eriodictyon californicum, a host plant of Coelopoeta glutinosi, growing in California.

The caterpillars feed on Eriodictyon species, a genus of plants in the borage family, Boraginaceae, including E. californicum, E. crassifolium and E. trichocalyx. They mine the leaves of their host plant. The mine is gall-like. The mine is on the top side of the leaf; it extends from the midrib to either side, occupying the "width of the leaf". This so contorts the leaf that it curls over the mine at both the sides and at the end. The larva then sequesters its frass to the top of the gall-like structure, separating it from a large chamber below with a thin sheet of silk, both structures fitting within the upper and lower epidermis of the leaf. Within this lower chamber the caterpillar spins its cocoon. The cocoon has a prolonged tube at its anterior end which opens up into a semicircular slit the caterpillar has made in the leaf surface.

Almost all the adult moths, the imagoes, have been caught flying in June and July, or reared and then emerged from their cocoons in June and July, although a few have been collected up until the first day of September.

== Uses ==
It was numbered as 1076 in the 1983 Check List of the Lepidoptera of America North of Mexico (this part written by Hodges).
