= Coelopoeta =

Scientific classification
- Kingdom: Animalia
- Phylum: Arthropoda
- Clade: Pancrustacea
- Class: Insecta
- Order: Lepidoptera
- Family: Pterolonchidae
- Genus: Coelopoeta; Walsingham, 1907

Genus of moths

Coelopoeta is a relatively divergent genus of small moths in the superfamily Gelechioidea, which have only been found in western North America.

Its relationships have been interpreted differently over the past century. It has been placed in the family Elachistidae, the family Oecophoridae, and the subfamily Coelopoetinae within the Elachistidae.

== Taxonomy ==
It was described from California in 1907 as a monotypic genus by Thomas de Grey, 6th Baron Walsingham to house the new species C. glutinosi, which is therefore the type species. Lord Walsingham placed the genus in the family Hyponomeutidae.

A second species from California was added in 1920 by William Barnes and August Busck, C. baldella, based on supposed colour differences with the type species, and the genus was moved to the family Elachistidae by these two authors in the same paper. This new taxon was then synonymised with C. glutinosi by Annette F. Braun in 1948 due to the insects being morphologically identical and found on the same food plants, rendering the genus monotypic again. This interpretation of synonymy was upheld by Ronald W. Hodges in 1983, Lauri Kaila in 1995, and van Nieukerken et al. in 2011.

Braun also placed the genus in the family Elachistidae in her 1948 monograph on the North American members of the family, based on the morphology of the mouth parts, the antenna and the wing venation, although she mentions the divergent genitalia compared to the rest of the family.

Hodges was the first to classified the one species in its own subfamily, the Coelopoetinae of the Elachistidae, in 1978, although he mentions doubting if the new subgenus might not better be placed in the Oecophorini. and in the 1983 Check List of the Lepidoptera of America North of Mexico (in which it is numbered 1076) he retained this classification. In 1995 Kaila reviewed the genus Coelopoeta and continued to include it in the family Elachistidae. He described two new species, one from high elevations in California and another from the Yukon in Canada.

Brown et al. classified the genus in the subfamily Oecophorinae of the Oecophoridae in 2004.

In Zhi-Qiang Zhang's 2011 attempt to number all the known animal species of earth, van Nieukerken et al., the authors of the section on Lepidoptera, recognised the Coelopoetidae as an independent, monotypic family within the superfamily Gelechioidea, comprising three species in the genus Coelopoeta. Three years later, in 2014, a cladistic analysis by Heikkilä et al. moved the genus to the subfamily Coelopoetinae of the family Pterolonchidae.

== Species ==
- Coelopoeta glutinosi Walsingham, 1907 - California
- Coelopoeta phaceliae Kaila, 1995 - California
- Coelopoeta maiadella Kaila, 1995 - Yukon

== Distribution ==
Coelopoeta is native to western North America, from California to the Yukon, although none are recorded from Oregon, Washington, Idaho or British Columbia.

== Ecology ==
The caterpillars of C. glutinosi mine within the leaves of Eriodictyon plant species, those of C. phaceliae are hosted on species of Phacelia.
