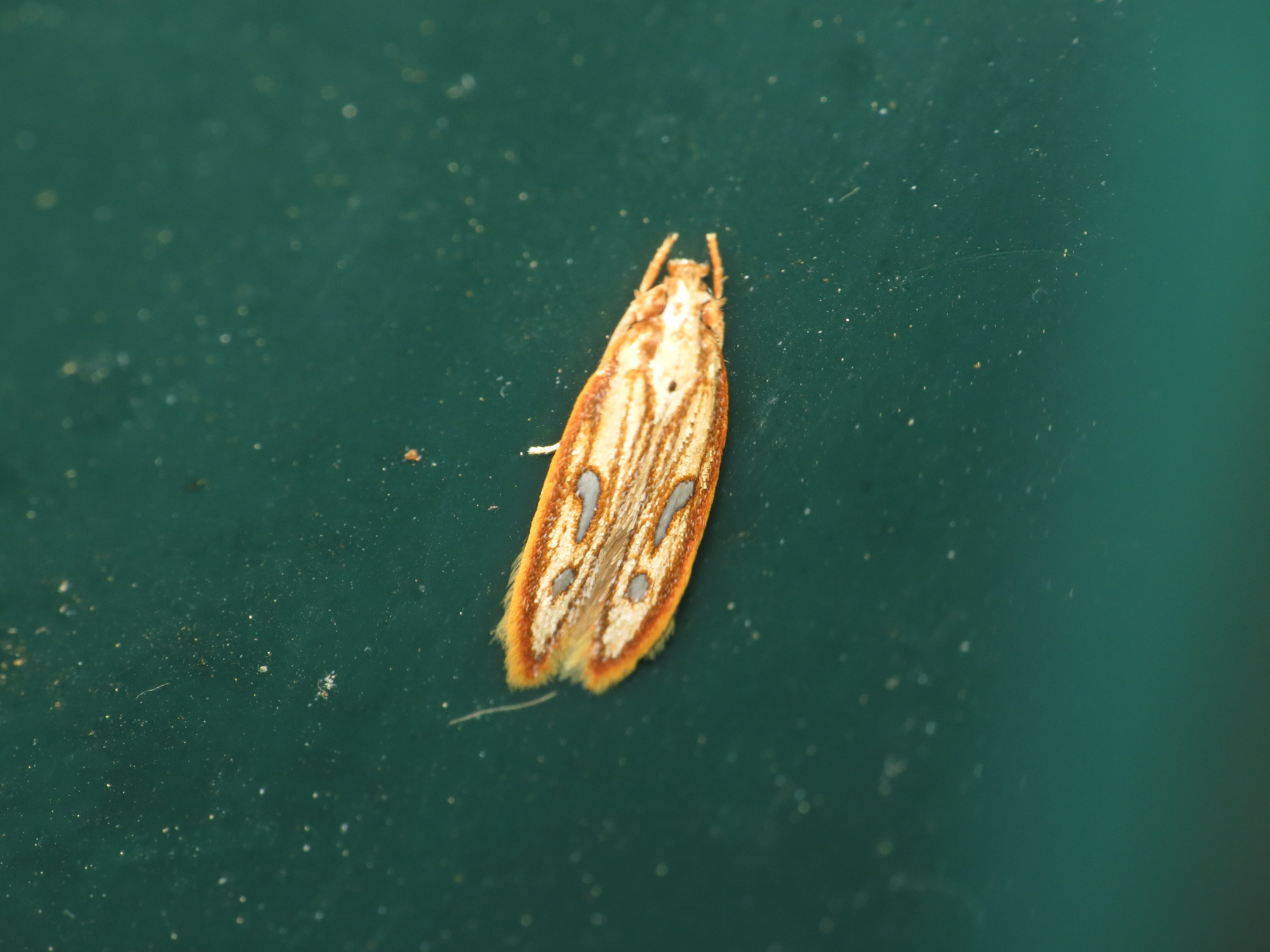
- Homaledra heptathalama is sometimes known as the "exclamation moth" - see the wing pattern

Scientific classification
- Kingdom: Animalia
- Phylum: Arthropoda
- Clade: Pancrustacea
- Class: Insecta
- Order: Lepidoptera
- Family: Pterolonchidae
- Genus: Homaledra; Busck, 1900

= Homaledra =

Moth genus in family Batrachedridae

Homaledra is a small genus of at least four species small moth of the family Pterolonchidae native to North and South America.

== Taxonomy ==
It was included in the family Coleophoridae by Ron Hodges in 1983. Hodges then moved it to the subfamily Batrachedrinae of the Batrachedridae in 1999. In 2014, a cladistic analysis performed by Heikkilä et al., made them deem it necessary to reclassify the genus in the family Pterolonchidae.

In 1997 Hodges moved the two South American species Pammeces citraula and P. crocoxysta to Homaledra.

== Species ==
The following species are known:

- Homaledra citraula (Meyrick, 1922) - Peru
- Homaledra crocoxysta (Meyrick, 1922) - Brazil
- Homaledra heptathalama Busck, 1900 - Alabama, Florida and South Carolina.
- Homaledra sabalella (Chambers, 1880) - Alabama, Florida, Mississippi, South Carolina, Texas, Puerto Rico, Hispaniola and Cuba.

== Ecology ==
Homaledra heptathalama feeds in the folds on the undersides of the palm fronds, using silk bolstered with its frass to construct a small elongate chamber to which it adds, as it grows, successively larger, more or less rectangular, thick-walled, communicating rooms, usually building up to eight.

== Uses ==
At least two species are pests of palms in Florida.
