= List of Apanteles species =

These 635 species belong to the genus Apanteles, braconid wasps.

== Apanteles species ==
- Apanteles abdera Nixon, 1965
- Apanteles abditus Muesebeck, 1957
- Apanteles acoris Nixon, 1965
- Apanteles acutissimus Granger, 1949
- Apanteles adelinamoralesae Fernández-Triana, 2014
- Apanteles adoxophyesi Minamikawa, 1954
- Apanteles adreus Nixon, 1965
- Apanteles adrianachavarriae Fernández-Triana, 2014
- Apanteles adrianaguilarae Fernández-Triana, 2014
- Apanteles adrianguadamuzi Fernández-Triana, 2014
- Apanteles afer Wilkinson, 1932
- Apanteles agatillus Nixon, 1965
- Apanteles aglaope Nixon, 1965
- Apanteles aglaus Nixon, 1965
- Apanteles agrus Nixon, 1965
- Apanteles aichagirardae Fernández-Triana, 2014
- Apanteles aidalopezae Fernández-Triana, 2014
- Apanteles alaspharus Nixon, 1965
- Apanteles alastor de Saeger, 1944
- Apanteles alazoni Lozan, 2008
- Apanteles albanjimenezi Fernández-Triana, 2014
- Apanteles albinervis (Cameron, 1904)
- Apanteles alejandromasisi Fernández-Triana, 2014
- Apanteles alejandromorai Fernández-Triana, 2014
- Apanteles alexanderi Brèthes, 1922
- Apanteles allofulvigaster Long, 2007
- Apanteles alvarougaldei Fernández-Triana, 2014
- Apanteles anabellecordobae Fernández-Triana, 2014
- Apanteles anamarencoae Fernández-Triana, 2014
- Apanteles anamartinezae Fernández-Triana, 2014
- Apanteles anariasae Fernández-Triana, 2014
- Apanteles anatole Nixon, 1965
- Apanteles andreacalvoae Fernández-Triana, 2014
- Apanteles angaleti Muesebeck, 1956
- Apanteles angelsolisi Fernández-Triana, 2014
- Apanteles angulatus Granger, 1949
- Apanteles angustibasis Gahan, 1925
- Apanteles anodaphus Nixon, 1965
- Apanteles ansata Song & Chen, 2004
- Apanteles anthozelae de Saeger, 1941
- Apanteles anticlea Nixon, 1965
- Apanteles antilla Nixon, 1965
- Apanteles arachidis Risbec, 1951
- Apanteles araeceri Wilkinson, 1928
- Apanteles aragatzi Tobias, 1976
- Apanteles arielopezi Fernández-Triana, 2014
- Apanteles arion Nixon, 1965
- Apanteles ariovistus Nixon, 1965
- Apanteles aristaeus Nixon, 1965
- Apanteles aristoteliae Viereck, 1912
- Apanteles arsanes Nixon, 1965
- Apanteles articas Nixon, 1965
- Apanteles artustigma Liu & Chen, 2015
- Apanteles arundinariae de Saeger, 1944
- Apanteles asphondyliae (Kieffer & Jörgensen, 1910)
- Apanteles assis Nixon, 1965
- Apanteles atrocephalus Granger, 1949
- Apanteles attevae Yousuf, Hassan & Singh, 2008
- Apanteles audens Kotenko, 1986
- Apanteles aurangabadensis Rao & Chalikwar, 1970
- Apanteles azollae Sumodan & Sevichan, 1989
- Apanteles bajariae Papp, 1975
- Apanteles baldufi Muesebeck, 1968
- Apanteles balteatae Lal, 1942
- Apanteles balthazari (Ashmead, 1900)
- Apanteles bannaensis Song, Chen & Yang, 2001
- Apanteles baoli Risbec, 1951
- Apanteles basicavus Liu & Chen, 2015
- Apanteles bellatulus de Saeger, 1944
- Apanteles bernardoespinozai Fernández-Triana, 2014
- Apanteles bernyapui Fernández-Triana, 2014
- Apanteles bettymarchenae Fernández-Triana, 2014
- Apanteles bienvenidachavarriae Fernández-Triana, 2014
- Apanteles biroicus Papp, 1973
- Apanteles bitalensis de Saeger, 1944
- Apanteles bordagei Giard, 1898
- Apanteles brachmiae Bhatnagar, 1950
- Apanteles braziliensis (Kieffer & Tavares, 1925)
- Apanteles bredoi de Saeger, 1941
- Apanteles brethesi Porter, 1917
- Apanteles brevicarinis Song, 2002
- Apanteles brevimetacarpus Hedqvist, 1965
- Apanteles brevivena Liu & Chen, 2015
- Apanteles bruchi Blanchard, 1941
- Apanteles brunnistigma Abdinbekova, 1969
- Apanteles brunnus Rao & Chalikwar, 1976
- Apanteles burunganus de Saeger, 1944
- Apanteles caesar Wilkinson, 1938
- Apanteles calixtomoragai Fernández-Triana, 2014
- Apanteles calycinae Wilkinson, 1928
- Apanteles camilla Nixon, 1965
- Apanteles camirus Nixon, 1965
- Apanteles canarsiae Ashmead, 1898
- Apanteles carloscastilloi Fernández-Triana, 2014
- Apanteles carlosguadamuzi Fernández-Triana, 2014
- Apanteles carlosrodriguezi Fernández-Triana, 2014
- Apanteles carlosviquezi Fernández-Triana, 2014
- Apanteles carloszunigai Fernández-Triana, 2014
- Apanteles carolinacanoae Fernández-Triana, 2014
- Apanteles carpatus (Say, 1836)
- Apanteles cassiae Chalikwar & Rao, 1982
- Apanteles cato de Saeger, 1944
- Apanteles cavatiptera Chen & Song, 2004
- Apanteles cavatithoracicus Chen, 2001
- Apanteles cavifrons Nixon, 1965
- Apanteles cebes Nixon, 1965
- Apanteles cecidiptae (Brèthes, 1916)
- Apanteles cerberus Nixon, 1965
- Apanteles cestius Nixon, 1965
- Apanteles chalcomelas Nixon, 1965
- Apanteles changhingensis Chu, 1937
- Apanteles characomae Risbec, 1951
- Apanteles chatterjeei Sharma & Chatterjee, 1970
- Apanteles chloris Nixon, 1965
- Apanteles christianzunigai Fernández-Triana, 2014
- Apanteles cingulicornis Granger, 1949
- Apanteles cinthiabarrantesae Fernández-Triana, 2014
- Apanteles ciriloumanai Fernández-Triana, 2014
- Apanteles clita Nixon, 1965
- Apanteles cockerelli Muesebeck, 1921
- Apanteles cocotis Wilkinson, 1934
- Apanteles coedicius Nixon, 1965
- Apanteles coffeellae Muesebeck, 1958
- Apanteles coilus Nixon, 1965
- Apanteles conanchetorum Viereck, 1917
- Apanteles concordalis Cameron, 1911
- Apanteles conon Nixon, 1965
- Apanteles conspicabilis de Saeger, 1944
- Apanteles contactus Papp, 1977
- Apanteles contaminatus (Haliday, 1834)
- Apanteles contemptus Nixon, 1965
- Apanteles cordoi de Santis, 1980
- Apanteles cornicula Chen & Song, 2004
- Apanteles cosmopterygivorus Liu & Chen, 2014
- Apanteles coxalis Szépligeti, 1911
- Apanteles crassicornis (Provancher, 1886)
- Apanteles crates Nixon, 1965
- Apanteles crispulae Blanchard, 1943
- Apanteles cristianalemani Fernández-Triana, 2014
- Apanteles crius Nixon, 1965
- Apanteles croceicornis Muesebeck, 1958
- Apanteles crocidolomiae Ahmad, 1945
- Apanteles crouzeli Blanchard, 1947
- Apanteles cuneiformis Song & Chen, 2004
- Apanteles curvicaudatus Granger, 1949
- Apanteles cynthiacorderoae Fernández-Triana, 2014
- Apanteles cyprioides Nixon, 1965
- Apanteles cypris Nixon, 1965
- Apanteles daimenes Nixon, 1965
- Apanteles dakotae Muesebeck, 1921
- Apanteles decoloratus Granger, 1949
- Apanteles deifiliadavilae Fernández-Triana, 2014
- Apanteles delhiensis Muesebeck & Subba Rao, 1958
- Apanteles dentatus Muesebeck, 1958
- Apanteles deplanatus Muesebeck, 1957
- Apanteles depressariae Muesebeck, 1931
- Apanteles derivatus Long, 2010
- Apanteles desantisi Blanchard, 1947
- Apanteles despectus Nixon, 1965
- Apanteles diatraeae Muesebeck, 1921
- Apanteles dickyui Fernández-Triana, 2014
- Apanteles dictys Nixon, 1965
- Apanteles didiguadamuzi Fernández-Triana, 2014
- Apanteles dido Nixon, 1965
- Apanteles diegoalpizari Fernández-Triana, 2014
- Apanteles diegotorresi Fernández-Triana, 2014
- Apanteles diniamartinezae Fernández-Triana, 2014
- Apanteles diocles Nixon, 1965
- Apanteles diourbeli Risbec, 1951
- Apanteles dissimilis Nixon, 1965
- Apanteles dores Nixon, 1965
- Apanteles dotus Nixon, 1965
- Apanteles drupes Nixon, 1965
- Apanteles dumosus Liu & Chen, 2014
- Apanteles duniagarciae Fernández-Triana, 2014
- Apanteles duplicatus Brèthes, 1922
- Apanteles duvalierbricenoi Fernández-Triana, 2014
- Apanteles edgarjimenezi Fernández-Triana, 2014
- Apanteles edithlopezae Fernández-Triana, 2014
- Apanteles eduardoramirezi Fernández-Triana, 2014
- Apanteles edwardsii Riley, 1889
- Apanteles edwinapuii Fernández-Triana, 2014
- Apanteles elagabalus Nixon, 1965
- Apanteles eldarayae Fernández-Triana, 2014
- Apanteles eliethcantillanoae Fernández-Triana, 2014
- Apanteles epiblemae Muesebeck, 1935
- Apanteles epijarbi Rao, 1953
- Apanteles epinotiae Viereck, 1912
- Apanteles erickduartei Fernández-Triana, 2014
- Apanteles eriphyle Nixon, 1965
- Apanteles erse Nixon, 1965
- Apanteles esthercentenoae Fernández-Triana, 2014
- Apanteles eublemmae Nixon, 1965
- Apanteles eugeniaphilipsae Fernández-Triana, 2014
- Apanteles eulogiosequeirai Fernández-Triana, 2014
- Apanteles eupolis Nixon, 1965
- Apanteles eurynome Nixon, 1965
- Apanteles eurytergis de Saeger, 1941
- Apanteles evadnix Shenefelt, 1972
- Apanteles evanidus Papp, 1975
- Apanteles evansi Nixon, 1971
- Apanteles faustina Nixon, 1965
- Apanteles federicomatarritai Fernández-Triana, 2014
- Apanteles felipechavarriai Fernández-Triana, 2014
- Apanteles felixcarmonai Fernández-Triana, 2014
- Apanteles feltiae Viereck, 1912
- Apanteles fernandochavarriai Fernández-Triana, 2014
- Apanteles firmus Telenga, 1949
- Apanteles flavicapus Liu & Chen, 2014
- Apanteles flavicentrus Long, 2010
- Apanteles flavigaster Long, 2010
- Apanteles floralis Tobias, 1966
- Apanteles flormoralesae Fernández-Triana, 2014
- Apanteles florus Nixon, 1965
- Apanteles fluitantis de Santis, 1980
- Apanteles fontinalis de Saeger, 1944
- Apanteles forbesi Viereck, 1910
- Apanteles franciscopizarroi Fernández-Triana, 2014
- Apanteles franciscoramirezi Fernández-Triana, 2014
- Apanteles freddyquesadai Fernández-Triana, 2014
- Apanteles freddysalazari Fernández-Triana, 2014
- Apanteles fredi Austin & Dangerfield, 1989
- Apanteles frersi (Brèthes, 1917)
- Apanteles fumiferanae Viereck, 1912
- Apanteles fundulus Nixon, 1965
- Apanteles gabrielagutierrezae Fernández-Triana, 2014
- Apanteles galatea Nixon, 1965
- Apanteles galleriae Wilkinson, 1932
- Apanteles gandoensis de Saeger, 1944
- Apanteles garygibsoni Fernández-Triana, 2014
- Apanteles gaytotini Blanchard, 1959
- Apanteles gerardobandoi Fernández-Triana, 2014
- Apanteles gerardosandovali Fernández-Triana, 2014
- Apanteles ghesquierei de Saeger, 1941
- Apanteles gialamensis Long, 2007
- Apanteles gitebe de Saeger, 1944
- Apanteles gladysrojasae Fernández-Triana, 2014
- Apanteles glenriverai Fernández-Triana, 2014
- Apanteles gloriasihezarae Fernández-Triana, 2014
- Apanteles goron Nixon, 1965
- Apanteles gracilicorne Song & Chen, 2004
- Apanteles gracilipes Song & Chen, 2004
- Apanteles guadaluperodriguezae Fernández-Triana, 2014
- Apanteles guamensis (Holmgren, 1868)
- Apanteles guillermopereirai Fernández-Triana, 2014
- Apanteles hainanensis Liu & Chen, 2015
- Apanteles halfordi Ullyett, 1946
- Apanteles hapaliae de Saeger, 1941
- Apanteles harryramirezi Fernández-Triana, 2014
- Apanteles harti Viereck, 1910
- Apanteles hatinhensis Long, 2010
- Apanteles haywardi Blanchard, 1947
- Apanteles hazelcambroneroae Fernández-Triana, 2014
- Apanteles hebrus Nixon, 1965
- Apanteles hectorsolisi Fernández-Triana, 2014
- Apanteles hedwigi Shenefelt, 1972
- Apanteles heichinensis Sonan, 1942
- Apanteles hellulae Risbec, 1951
- Apanteles hemara Nixon, 1965
- Apanteles hemiaurantius van Achterberg & Ng, 2009
- Apanteles hersilia Nixon, 1965
- Apanteles holmgreni Shenefelt, 1972
- Apanteles horaeus Kotenko, 1986
- Apanteles huberi Fernández-Triana, 2010
- Apanteles humbertolopezi Fernández-Triana, 2014
- Apanteles hyalinatus Granger, 1949
- Apanteles hymeniae Wilkinson, 1935
- Apanteles icarti Blanchard, 1960
- Apanteles imitandus Muesebeck, 1954
- Apanteles impiger Muesebeck, 1958
- Apanteles importunus Wilkinson, 1928
- Apanteles impunctatus Muesebeck, 1933
- Apanteles inaron Nixon, 1965
- Apanteles incurvus Liu & Chen, 2014
- Apanteles inesolisae Fernández-Triana, 2014
- Apanteles inops Nixon, 1965
- Apanteles insignicaudatus Granger, 1949
- Apanteles insularis Muesebeck, 1921
- Apanteles inunctus Nixon, 1965
- Apanteles ione Nixon, 1965
- Apanteles ippeus Nixon, 1965
- Apanteles irenecarrilloae Fernández-Triana, 2014
- Apanteles isaacbermudezi Fernández-Triana, 2014
- Apanteles isander Nixon, 1965
- Apanteles isidrochaconi Fernández-Triana, 2014
- Apanteles isidrovillegasi Fernández-Triana, 2014
- Apanteles ivondroensis Granger, 1949
- Apanteles ivonnetranae Fernández-Triana, 2014
- Apanteles jairomoyai Fernández-Triana, 2014
- Apanteles javiercontrerasi Fernández-Triana, 2014
- Apanteles javierobandoi Fernández-Triana, 2014
- Apanteles javiersihezari Fernández-Triana, 2014
- Apanteles jenniferae Fernández-Triana, 2010
- Apanteles jesusbrenesi Fernández-Triana, 2014
- Apanteles jesusugaldei Fernández-Triana, 2014
- Apanteles jimmychevezi Fernández-Triana, 2014
- Apanteles johanvargasi Fernández-Triana, 2014
- Apanteles jorgecortesi Fernández-Triana, 2014
- Apanteles jorgehernandezi Fernández-Triana, 2014
- Apanteles josecalvoi Fernández-Triana, 2014
- Apanteles josecortezi Fernández-Triana, 2014
- Apanteles josediazi Fernández-Triana, 2014
- Apanteles josejaramilloi Fernández-Triana, 2014
- Apanteles josemonteroi Fernández-Triana, 2014
- Apanteles joseperezi Fernández-Triana, 2014
- Apanteles joserasi Fernández-Triana, 2014
- Apanteles juanapuii Fernández-Triana, 2014
- Apanteles juancarrilloi Fernández-Triana, 2014
- Apanteles juangazoi Fernández-Triana, 2014
- Apanteles juanhernandezi Fernández-Triana, 2014
- Apanteles juanlopezi Fernández-Triana, 2014
- Apanteles juanmatai Fernández-Triana, 2014
- Apanteles juanvictori Fernández-Triana, 2014
- Apanteles jubmeli Hedqvist, 1972
- Apanteles juliodiazi Fernández-Triana, 2014
- Apanteles juniorlopezi Fernández-Triana, 2014
- Apanteles keineraragoni Fernández-Triana, 2014
- Apanteles kivuensis de Saeger, 1941
- Apanteles kubensis Abdinbekova, 1969
- Apanteles lacteus (Nees, 1834)
- Apanteles laevicoxis Muesebeck, 1921
- Apanteles lanassa Nixon, 1965
- Apanteles langenburgensis Szépligeti, 1911
- Apanteles laricellae Mason, 1959
- Apanteles latericarinatus Song & Chen, 2001
- Apanteles latisulca Chen & Song, 2004
- Apanteles laurahuberae Fernández-Triana, 2014
- Apanteles laurenmoralesae Fernández-Triana, 2014
- Apanteles lavignei Blanchard, 1959
- Apanteles laxus de Saeger, 1944
- Apanteles lectus Tobias, 1964
- Apanteles lenea Nixon, 1976
- Apanteles leninguadamuzi Fernández-Triana, 2014
- Apanteles leonelgarayi Fernández-Triana, 2014
- Apanteles leptothecus (Cameron, 1907)
- Apanteles leptoura Cameron, 1909
- Apanteles leucochiloneae Cameron, 1911
- Apanteles leucopus (Ashmead, 1900)
- Apanteles leucostigmus (Ashmead, 1900)
- Apanteles lilliammenae Fernández-Triana, 2014
- Apanteles lineodos Cameron, 1911
- Apanteles linus Nixon, 1965
- Apanteles liopleuris Szépligeti, 1914
- Apanteles lisabearssae Fernández-Triana, 2014
- Apanteles longiantenna Chen & Song, 2004
- Apanteles longicaudatus You & Zhou, 1991
- Apanteles longirostris Chen & Song, 2004
- Apanteles longistylus de Saeger, 1944
- Apanteles longitergiae Rao & Kurian, 1950
- Apanteles luciariosae Fernández-Triana, 2014
- Apanteles luisbrizuelai Fernández-Triana, 2014
- Apanteles luiscanalesi Fernández-Triana, 2014
- Apanteles luiscantillanoi Fernández-Triana, 2014
- Apanteles luisgarciai Fernández-Triana, 2014
- Apanteles luisgaritai Fernández-Triana, 2014
- Apanteles luishernandezi Fernández-Triana, 2014
- Apanteles luislopezi Fernández-Triana, 2014
- Apanteles luisvargasi Fernández-Triana, 2014
- Apanteles lunata Song & Chen, 2004
- Apanteles luteocinctus de Saeger, 1941
- Apanteles luzmariaromeroae Fernández-Triana, 2014
- Apanteles lycidas Nixon, 1965
- Apanteles lyridice Nixon, 1965
- Apanteles machaeralis Wilkinson, 1928
- Apanteles macromphaliae Silva Figueroa, 1917
- Apanteles magnioculus Liu & Chen, 2015
- Apanteles malleus Liu & Chen, 2014
- Apanteles mamitus Nixon, 1965
- Apanteles manuelarayai Fernández-Triana, 2014
- Apanteles manuelpereirai Fernández-Triana, 2014
- Apanteles manuelriosi Fernández-Triana, 2014
- Apanteles manuelzumbadoi Fernández-Triana, 2014
- Apanteles marcobustosi Fernández-Triana, 2014
- Apanteles marcogonzalezi Fernández-Triana, 2014
- Apanteles marcovenicioi Fernández-Triana, 2014
- Apanteles mariachavarriae Fernández-Triana, 2014
- Apanteles mariaguevarae Fernández-Triana, 2014
- Apanteles marialuisariasae Fernández-Triana, 2014
- Apanteles mariamendezae Fernández-Triana, 2014
- Apanteles marianopereirai Fernández-Triana, 2014
- Apanteles mariatorrentesae Fernández-Triana, 2014
- Apanteles marisolarroyoae Fernández-Triana, 2014
- Apanteles marisolnavarroae Fernández-Triana, 2014
- Apanteles marvinmendozai Fernández-Triana, 2014
- Apanteles masoni Chen & Song, 2004
- Apanteles mauriciogurdiani Fernández-Triana, 2014
- Apanteles medioexcavatus Granger, 1949
- Apanteles medioimpressus Granger, 1949
- Apanteles medon Nixon, 1965
- Apanteles megastidis Muesebeck, 1958
- Apanteles megathymi Riley, 1881
- Apanteles mehdialii Rao & Chalikwar, 1970
- Apanteles melpomene Nixon, 1965
- Apanteles menes Nixon, 1965
- Apanteles meriones Nixon, 1965
- Apanteles metacarpalis (Thomson, 1895)
- Apanteles metacarpellatus Blanchard, 1963
- Apanteles metagenes Nixon, 1965
- Apanteles metellus Nixon, 1965
- Apanteles milenagutierrezae Fernández-Triana, 2014
- Apanteles milleri Mason, 1974
- Apanteles mimoristae Muesebeck, 1922
- Apanteles minatchy Rousse & Gupta, 2013
- Apanteles minator Muesebeck, 1957
- Apanteles minor Fahringer, 1938
- Apanteles minorcarmonai Fernández-Triana, 2014
- Apanteles minornavarroi Fernández-Triana, 2014
- Apanteles miramis Nixon, 1976
- Apanteles mohandasi Sumodan & Narendran, 1990
- Apanteles monicachavarriae Fernández-Triana, 2014
- Apanteles montezumae Sánchez, Figueroa & Whitfield, 2015
- Apanteles morrisi Mason, 1974
- Apanteles morroensis Nixon, 1955
- Apanteles mujtabai Bhatnagar, 1950
- Apanteles munnarensis Sumodan & Narendran, 1990
- Apanteles murcia Nixon, 1965
- Apanteles muticiculus Liu & Chen, 2014
- Apanteles mutilia Nixon, 1965
- Apanteles mycerinus Nixon, 1965
- Apanteles mycetophilus Wilkinson, 1931
- Apanteles myrsus Nixon, 1965
- Apanteles namkumensis Gupta, 1957
- Apanteles natras Nixon, 1965
- Apanteles navius Nixon, 1965
- Apanteles nemesis Nixon, 1965
- Apanteles neotaeniaticornis Yousuf & Ray, 2010
- Apanteles nepe Nixon, 1965
- Apanteles nephereus Nixon, 1965
- Apanteles nephoptericis (Packard, 1864)
- Apanteles nephus Papp, 1974
- Apanteles niceppe Nixon, 1965
- Apanteles nidophilus Whitfield & Cameron, 2001
- Apanteles nigrofemoratus Granger, 1949
- Apanteles ninigretorum Viereck, 1917
- Apanteles nitidus de Saeger, 1944
- Apanteles nivellus Nixon, 1965
- Apanteles nixoni Song, 2002
- Apanteles noronhai de Santis, 1975
- Apanteles novatus Nixon, 1965
- Apanteles nycon Nixon, 1965
- Apanteles nymphis Nixon, 1965
- Apanteles oatmani Marsh, 1979
- Apanteles obscurus (Nees, 1834)
- Apanteles oculatus Tobias, 1967
- Apanteles odites Nixon, 1965
- Apanteles oenone Nixon, 1965
- Apanteles olorus Nixon, 1965
- Apanteles opacus (Ashmead, 1905)
- Apanteles opuntiarum Martínez & Berta, 2012
- Apanteles orientalis Szépligeti, 1913
- Apanteles oritias Nixon, 1965
- Apanteles oroetes Nixon, 1965
- Apanteles orphne Nixon, 1965
- Apanteles ortia Nixon, 1965
- Apanteles orus Nixon, 1965
- Apanteles oryzicola Watanabe, 1967
- Apanteles oscarchavezi Fernández-Triana, 2014
- Apanteles oscus Nixon, 1965
- Apanteles osvaldoespinozai Fernández-Triana, 2014
- Apanteles pablotranai Fernández-Triana, 2014
- Apanteles pabloumanai Fernández-Triana, 2014
- Apanteles pablovasquezi Fernández-Triana, 2014
- Apanteles pachycarinatus Song & Chen, 2002
- Apanteles painei Nixon, 1965
- Apanteles paraglaope Long, 2010
- Apanteles paraguayensis Brèthes, 1924
- Apanteles paralus Nixon, 1965
- Apanteles paranthrenidis Muesebeck, 1921
- Apanteles parapholetesor Liu & Chen, 2015
- Apanteles parkeri Muesebeck, 1954
- Apanteles parsodes Nixon, 1965
- Apanteles parvus Liu & Chen, 2014
- Apanteles pashmina Rousse, 2013
- Apanteles pastranai Blanchard, 1960
- Apanteles patens Nixon, 1965
- Apanteles paulaixcamparijae Fernández-Triana, 2014
- Apanteles peisonis Fischer, 1965
- Apanteles pellucipterus Song & Chen, 2001
- Apanteles pentagonalis Blanchard, 1963
- Apanteles pentagonius de Saeger, 1944
- Apanteles peridoneus Papp, 1974
- Apanteles persephone Nixon, 1965
- Apanteles pertiades Nixon, 1965
- Apanteles petilicaudium Chen, Song & Yang, 2002
- Apanteles petronariosae Fernández-Triana, 2014
- Apanteles phalis Nixon, 1965
- Apanteles phtorimoeae Risbec, 1951
- Apanteles phycodis Viereck, 1913
- Apanteles piceotrichosus Blanchard, 1947
- Apanteles pilosus Telenga, 1955
- Apanteles platyptiliophagus Shenefelt, 1972
- Apanteles platyptiliovorus Blanchard, 1965
- Apanteles plesius Viereck, 1912
- Apanteles polychrosidis Viereck, 1912
- Apanteles pongamiae Sumodan & Narendran, 1990
- Apanteles prinoptus Papp, 1984
- Apanteles procoxalis Hedqvist, 1965
- Apanteles prosopis Risbec, 1951
- Apanteles prusias Nixon, 1965
- Apanteles psenes Nixon, 1965
- Apanteles pseudoglossae Muesebeck, 1921
- Apanteles pseudomacromphaliae Havrylenko & Winterhalter, 1949
- Apanteles pusaensis Lal, 1942
- Apanteles pycnos Nixon, 1965
- Apanteles pyrodercetus de Saeger, 1941
- Apanteles quadratus Anjum & Malik, 1978
- Apanteles quadrifacies Papp, 1984
- Apanteles quinquecarinis Song & Chen, 2003
- Apanteles racilla Nixon, 1965
- Apanteles raesus Nixon, 1965
- Apanteles randallgarciai Fernández-Triana, 2014
- Apanteles randallmartinezi Fernández-Triana, 2014
- Apanteles raulacevedoi Fernández-Triana, 2014
- Apanteles raulsolorsanoi Fernández-Triana, 2014
- Apanteles raviantenna Chen & Song, 2004
- Apanteles rhipheus Nixon, 1965
- Apanteles rhomboidalis (Ashmead, 1900)
- Apanteles ricardocaleroi Fernández-Triana, 2014
- Apanteles ricini Bhatnagar, 1950
- Apanteles riograndensis Brèthes, 1920
- Apanteles risbeci de Saeger, 1942
- Apanteles robertmontanoi Fernández-Triana, 2014
- Apanteles robertoespinozai Fernández-Triana, 2014
- Apanteles robertovargasi Fernández-Triana, 2014
- Apanteles robustus Hedqvist, 1965
- Apanteles rodrigogamezi Fernández-Triana, 2014
- Apanteles rogerblancoi Fernández-Triana, 2014
- Apanteles rolandoramosi Fernández-Triana, 2014
- Apanteles rolandovegai Fernández-Triana, 2014
- Apanteles romei Rousse, 2013
- Apanteles ronaldcastroi Fernández-Triana, 2014
- Apanteles ronaldgutierrezi Fernández-Triana, 2014
- Apanteles ronaldmurilloi Fernández-Triana, 2014
- Apanteles ronaldnavarroi Fernández-Triana, 2014
- Apanteles ronaldquirosi Fernández-Triana, 2014
- Apanteles ronaldzunigai Fernández-Triana, 2014
- Apanteles rosaces Nixon, 1965
- Apanteles rosibelelizondoae Fernández-Triana, 2014
- Apanteles rostermoragai Fernández-Triana, 2014
- Apanteles roughleyi Fernández-Triana, 2010
- Apanteles rufithorax Hedqvist, 1965
- Apanteles rugiceps Wilkinson, 1934
- Apanteles ruthfrancoae Fernández-Triana, 2014
- Apanteles rutilans Nixon, 1965
- Apanteles saegeri Risbec, 1951
- Apanteles sagax Wilkinson, 1929
- Apanteles salutifer Wilkinson, 1931
- Apanteles samedovi Abdinbekova, 1969
- Apanteles samoanus Fullaway, 1940
- Apanteles saravus Nixon, 1965
- Apanteles sauros Nixon, 1965
- Apanteles schneideri Nixon, 1965
- Apanteles schoutedeni de Saeger, 1941
- Apanteles sergiocascantei Fernández-Triana, 2014
- Apanteles sergioriosi Fernández-Triana, 2014
- Apanteles seyrigi Wilkinson, 1936
- Apanteles sigifredomarini Fernández-Triana, 2014
- Apanteles significans (Walker, 1860)
- Apanteles singaporensis Szépligeti, 1905
- Apanteles smerdis Nixon, 1965
- Apanteles sodalis (Haliday, 1834)
- Apanteles solox Nixon, 1965
- Apanteles sosis Nixon, 1965
- Apanteles sparsus Liu & Chen, 2015
- Apanteles spicicula Chen & Song, 2004
- Apanteles stagmatophorae Gahan, 1919
- Apanteles starki Mason, 1960
- Apanteles stegenodactylae Cameron, 1909
- Apanteles stennos Nixon, 1965
- Apanteles stenomae Muesebeck, 1958
- Apanteles stictipes Chen & Song, 2004
- Apanteles striatopleurus Hedqvist, 1965
- Apanteles subaltus de Saeger, 1944
- Apanteles subandinus Blanchard, 1947
- Apanteles subcamilla Long, 2007
- Apanteles subcristatus Blanchard, 1936
- Apanteles subductus (Walker, 1860)
- Apanteles subrugosus Granger, 1949
- Apanteles sulciscutis (Cameron, 1905)
- Apanteles syleptae Ferrière, 1925
- Apanteles sylvaticus de Saeger, 1944
- Apanteles symithae Bhatnagar, 1950
- Apanteles tachardiae Cameron, 1913
- Apanteles taeniaticornis Wilkinson, 1928
- Apanteles taiticus (Holmgren, 1868)
- Apanteles talinum Risbec, 1951
- Apanteles tapatapaoanus Fullaway, 1946
- Apanteles taragamae Viereck, 1912
- Apanteles telon Nixon, 1965
- Apanteles thoracartus Liu & Chen, 2015
- Apanteles thurberiae Muesebeck, 1921
- Apanteles tiapi Risbec, 1952
- Apanteles tiboshartae Fernández-Triana, 2014
- Apanteles tigasis Nixon, 1965
- Apanteles tirathabae Wilkinson, 1928
- Apanteles townesi Nixon, 1965
- Apanteles transtergum Liu & Chen, 2014
- Apanteles triareus Nixon, 1965
- Apanteles tricoloripes Granger, 1949
- Apanteles trifasciatus Muesebeck, 1946
- Apanteles trochanteratus Szépligeti, 1911
- Apanteles tulis Nixon, 1965
- Apanteles uchidai Watanabe, 1934
- Apanteles unguifortis Song & Chen, 2004
- Apanteles upis Nixon, 1965
- Apanteles uroxys de Saeger, 1941
- Apanteles usipetes Nixon, 1965
- Apanteles ussuriensis Telenga, 1955
- Apanteles vacillans Nixon, 1965
- Apanteles vala Nixon, 1965
- Apanteles valvatus de Saeger, 1944
- Apanteles valvulae Rao & Kurian, 1951
- Apanteles vannesabrenesae Fernández-Triana, 2014
- Apanteles verticalis Song & Chen, 2004
- Apanteles victorbarrantesi Fernández-Triana, 2014
- Apanteles vivax de Saeger, 1944
- Apanteles vulgaris (Ashmead, 1900)
- Apanteles wadyobandoi Fernández-Triana, 2014
- Apanteles waldymedinai Fernández-Triana, 2014
- Apanteles wanei Risbec, 1951
- Apanteles weitenweberi (Amerling, 1862)
- Apanteles wilbertharayai Fernández-Triana, 2014
- Apanteles williamcamposi Fernández-Triana, 2014
- Apanteles wuyiensis Song & Chen, 2002
- Apanteles xanthostigma (Haliday, 1834)
- Apanteles xerophila Risbec, 1951
- Apanteles yeissonchavesi Fernández-Triana, 2014
- Apanteles yilbertalvaradoi Fernández-Triana, 2014
- Apanteles yolandarojasae Fernández-Triana, 2014
- Apanteles zeneidabolanosae Fernández-Triana, 2014
- Apanteles zhangi Song & Chen, 2003
- Apanteles zizaniae Muesebeck, 1957
- Apanteles znoikoi Tobias, 1976
- † Apanteles concinnus Statz, 1938
- † Apanteles macrophthalmus Statz, 1938
