= Plexippica =

Scientific classification
- Kingdom: Animalia
- Phylum: Arthropoda
- Class: Insecta
- Order: Lepidoptera
- Family: Yponomeutidae
- Genus: Plexippica; Meyrick, 1912

Species
- See text

Synonyms
- Kruegerius Vives Moreno, 1999

Genus of moths

Plexippica is a genus of moths found in Africa. It is placed incertae sedis in the family Yponomeutidae, though Mey, 2011 placed it in the family Pterolonchidae. The type species is Plexippica verberata, and it was described by Meyrick in 1912.

== Species ==
- Plexippica verberata - Meyrick, 1912
- Plexippica fuscinervosa - Mey, 2011
