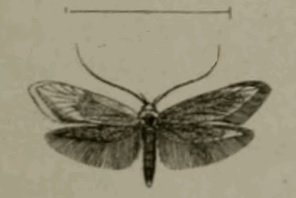
- Syringopais temperatella

Scientific classification
- Kingdom: Animalia
- Phylum: Arthropoda
- Clade: Pancrustacea
- Class: Insecta
- Order: Lepidoptera
- Family: Autostichidae
- Subfamily: Deocloninae
- Genus: Syringopais; M. Hering, 1919

Synonyms
- Nochelodes Meyrick, 1920

= Syringopais =

Genus of moths

Syringopais is a moth genus. It is here placed in family Pterolonchidae, but its relationships are obscure and some authors instead ally it with the Gelechiidae, Autostichinae and/or Symmocidae and place it elsewhere in the Gelechioidea.

== Species ==
- Syringopais temperatella (Lederer, 1855)
