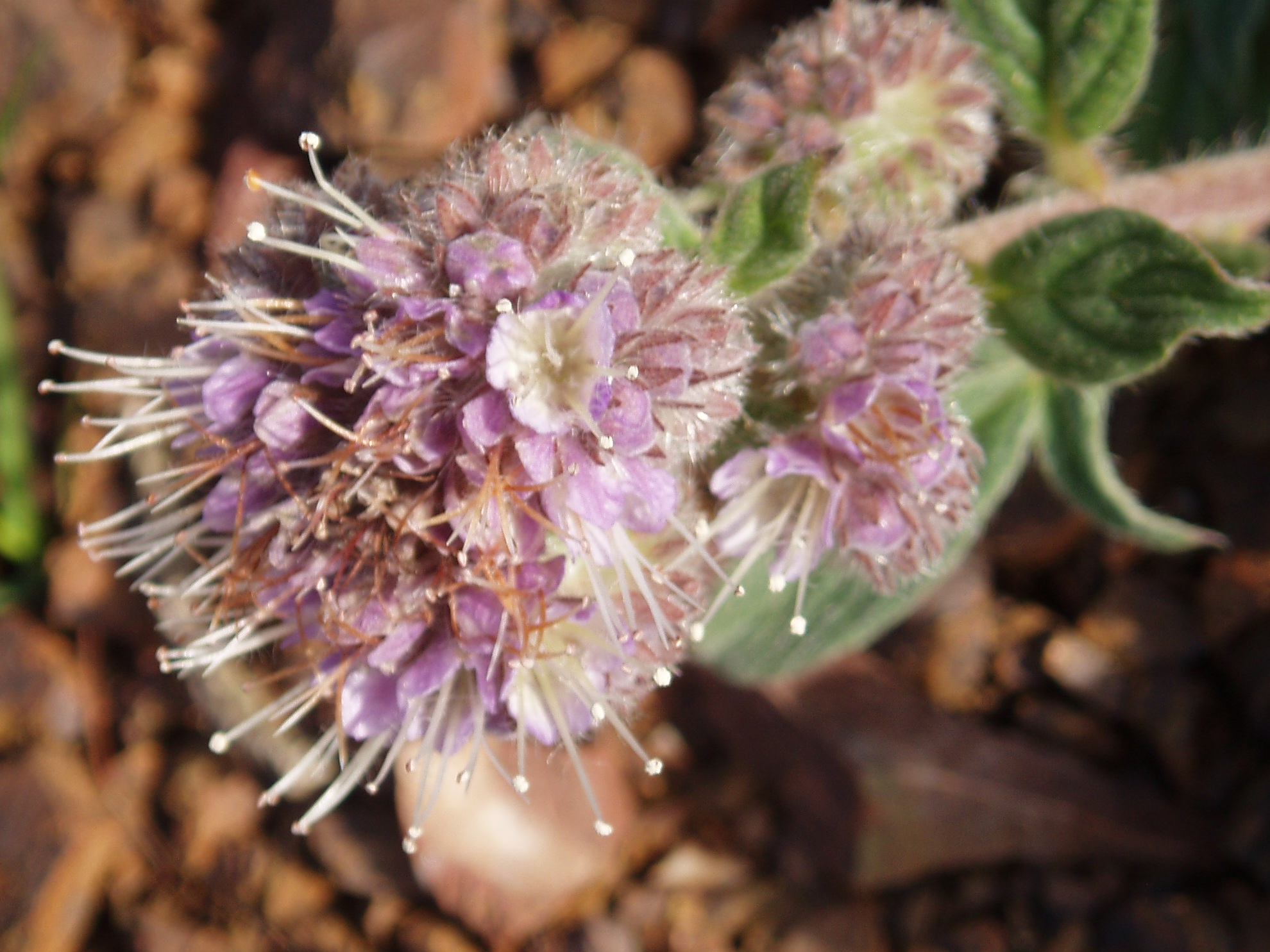

Scientific classification
- Kingdom: Plantae
- Clade: Tracheophytes
- Clade: Angiosperms
- Clade: Eudicots
- Clade: Asterids
- Order: Boraginales
- Family: Hydrophyllaceae
- Genus: Phacelia
- Species: P. californica

Binomial name
- Phacelia californica Cham.

= Phacelia californica =

Species of plant

Phacelia californica is a species of phacelia known by the common names California phacelia and California scorpionweed. It is native to coastal northern California and Oregon, where it grows in chaparral, woodland, and coastal bluffs and grassland.

It is a perennial herb growing decumbent or erect, its branching stems reaching up to 90 centimeters (35 in) long. It is roughly hairy in texture. The leaves are up to 20 centimeters (8 in) long, the lower ones divided into several leaflets. The dense, hairy inflorescence is a one-sided curving or coiling cyme of many bell-shaped flowers. Each white or pale blue to lavender flower is under 1 centimeter (1/3 in) wide.

This native wildflower is a food source for the Mission blue butterfly, an endangered species endemic to San Francisco.
