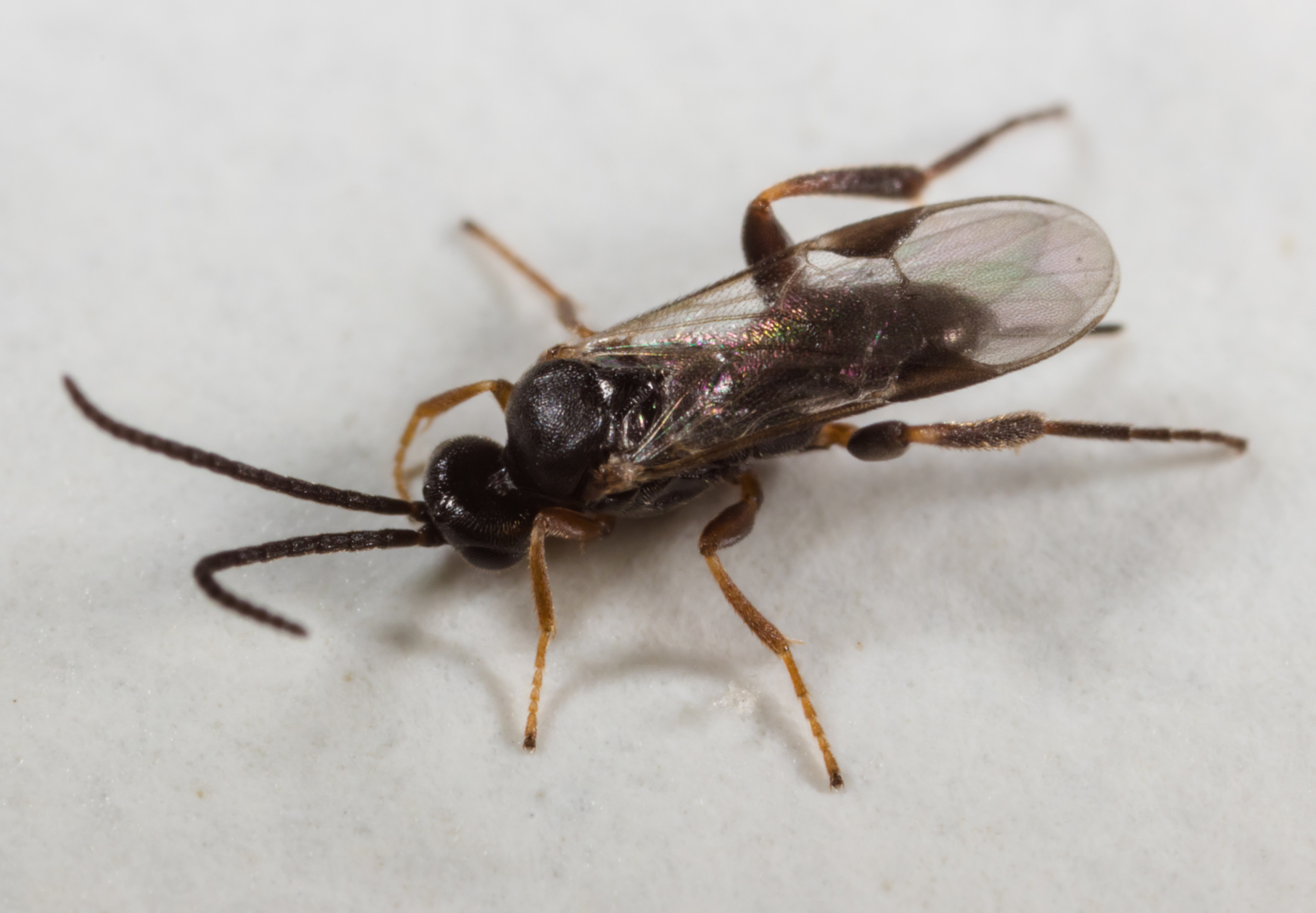
- Apanteles carpatus

Scientific classification
- Kingdom: Animalia
- Phylum: Arthropoda
- Class: Insecta
- Order: Hymenoptera
- Family: Braconidae
- Subfamily: Microgastrinae
- Genus: Apanteles; Förster, 1862

Diversity
- at least 1200 species

= Apanteles =

Genus of wasps

Apanteles is a very large genus of braconid wasps, containing more than 600 described species found worldwide. There are no native species in New Zealand, and none have been recorded in the high arctic.

== See also ==
- List of Apanteles species
