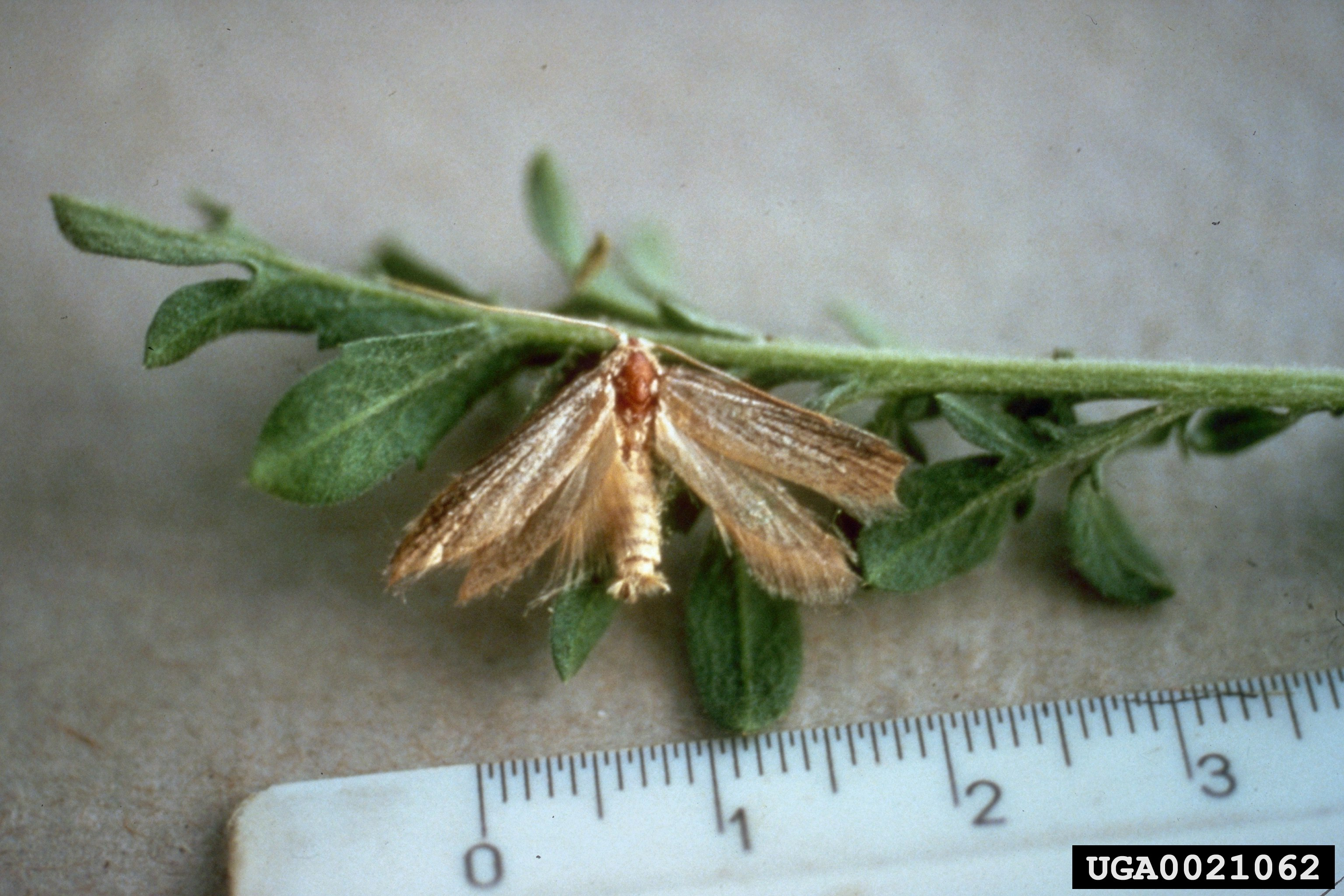
- Pterolonche inspersa adult

Scientific classification
- Kingdom: Animalia
- Phylum: Arthropoda
- Clade: Pancrustacea
- Class: Insecta
- Order: Lepidoptera
- Family: Pterolonchidae
- Genus: Pterolonche; Zeller, 1847

Synonyms
- Pteroloncha Handlirsch, 1925 -lapsus

= Pterolonche =

Genus of moth

Pterolonche is small genus of small moths of the family Pterolonchidae.

== Taxonomy ==
The genus was first circumscribed in 1847 by Philipp Christoph Zeller to include two new species. The type species is Pterolonche albescens.

In 1984 Antonio Vives Moreno described the new species P. gozmaniella from Andalucia, but in 1987 Vives reviewed the family Pterolonchidae in Spain, synonymising P. gozmaniella with P. lutescentella and P. gracilis with P. inspersa, describing a new species, and counting five species in the genus Pterolonche. He subdivided the genus in three subgenera. He did not address the species described by Hans Georg Amsel from respectively Malta and Iraq a few decades earlier.

In 2011 it was classified as one of two genera in the family Pterolonchidae in the superfamily Gelechioidea by van Nieukerken et al..

In 2014 a cladistics analysis performed by Heikkilä et al.. expanded the family to seven genera. They classified the genus in the subfamily Pterolonchinae.

== Species ==
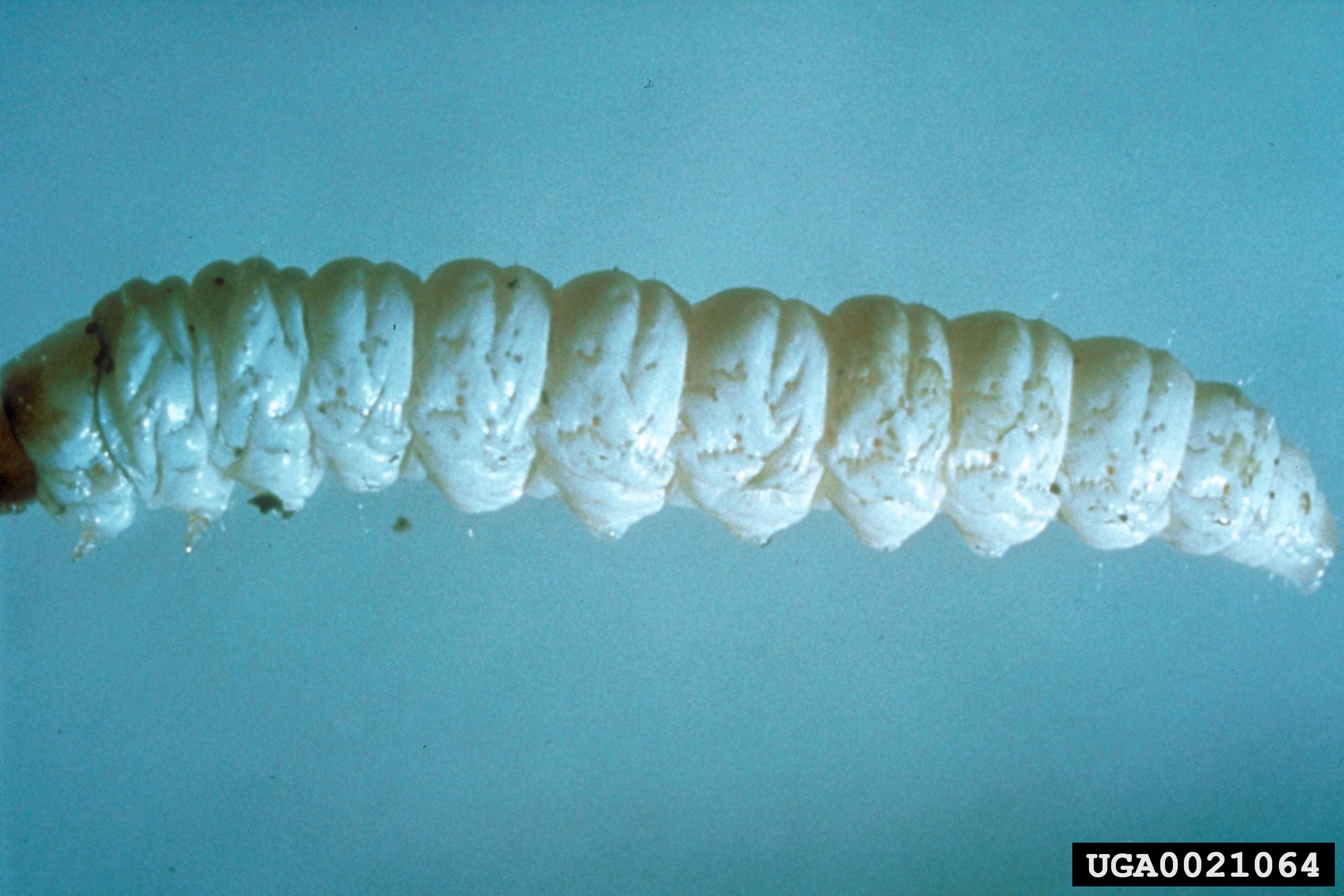
A Pterolonche inspersa caterpillar

The following species are known:

- subgenus Pterolonche - The imagoes have a white or greyish general colouration
  - Pterolonche albescens Zeller, 1847 - Sicily, throughout Spain, Balearic Islands, Islas de Cabreras, Algarve, France, Hungary, Romania, the former Yugoslavia, Turkey, Malta, Morocco
  - Pterolonche inspersa Staudinger, 1859 - Portugal, Spain, France, Italy, Sardinia, Sicily, the Czech Republic, Slovakia, Hungary, Bulgaria, Greece, Crete, Turkey, Egypt and Morocco.
  - Pterolonche vallettae Amsel, 1955 - Malta
- subgenus Agenjius Vives, 1987 - The imagoes have a pinkish-yellow colouration
  - Pterolonche lutescentella Chrétien, 1922 - Andalucia, Balearic Islands and northwest Maghreb in Morocco, Algeria, Tunisia
- subgenus Gomezbustillus Vives, 1987 - The imagoes have a pallid yellow colouration
  - Pterolonche pulverulenta Zeller, 1847 - Andalucia, Madrid, Gibraltar, Algarve, Baixo Alentejo, Sicily, Malta, Cyprus, Morocco, Tunisia
  - Pterolonche traugottolseniella Vives, 1987 - Málaga, Algarve
- unplaced
  - Pterolonche kurdistanella Amsel, 1959 - Iraq

== Distribution ==
The species are all found around the Mediterranean Sea. Spain has at least five species, Portugal has four. As far as is known, P. vallettae appears to be endemic to Malta.

== Ecology ==
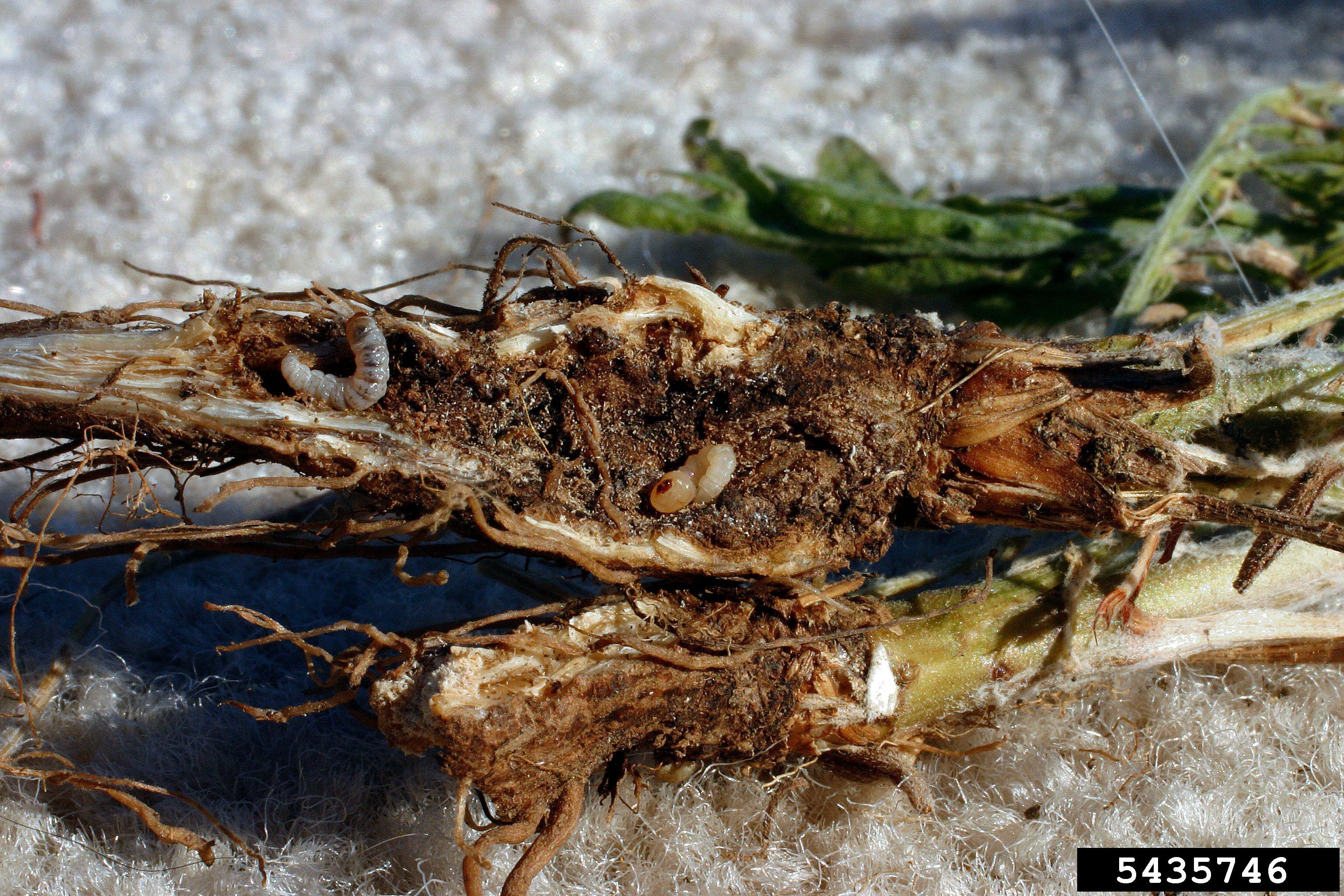
Pterolonche inspersa larvae infesting the roots of a Centaurea species.

The species are all nocturnal. Both sexes are attracted to artificial lights at night. In Spain the moths have two generations per year, with the first emerging from the end of march to the beginning of June, and a second, much more abundant generation between July and the start of October. They have been encountered from sea level to 1500m in altitude in Spain.

P. inspersa caterpillars feed on Centaurea species, a herbaceous, thistle-like plant. They tunnel into the root crown of their host plant and feed on the root tissue. As they reach the root cortex, they spin a silken tube and feed from within the tube. Mature larvae overwinter in the roots. In spring, a silken tube is made above the soil surface in which pupation takes place.

== Uses ==
P. inspersa was released as a biological control agent for knapweed, Centaurea diffusa, in Colorado, Montana, and Oregon in the mid to late 1980s, although there was no known establishment of the species in the United States initially, it has since spread to Idaho and British Columbia.
