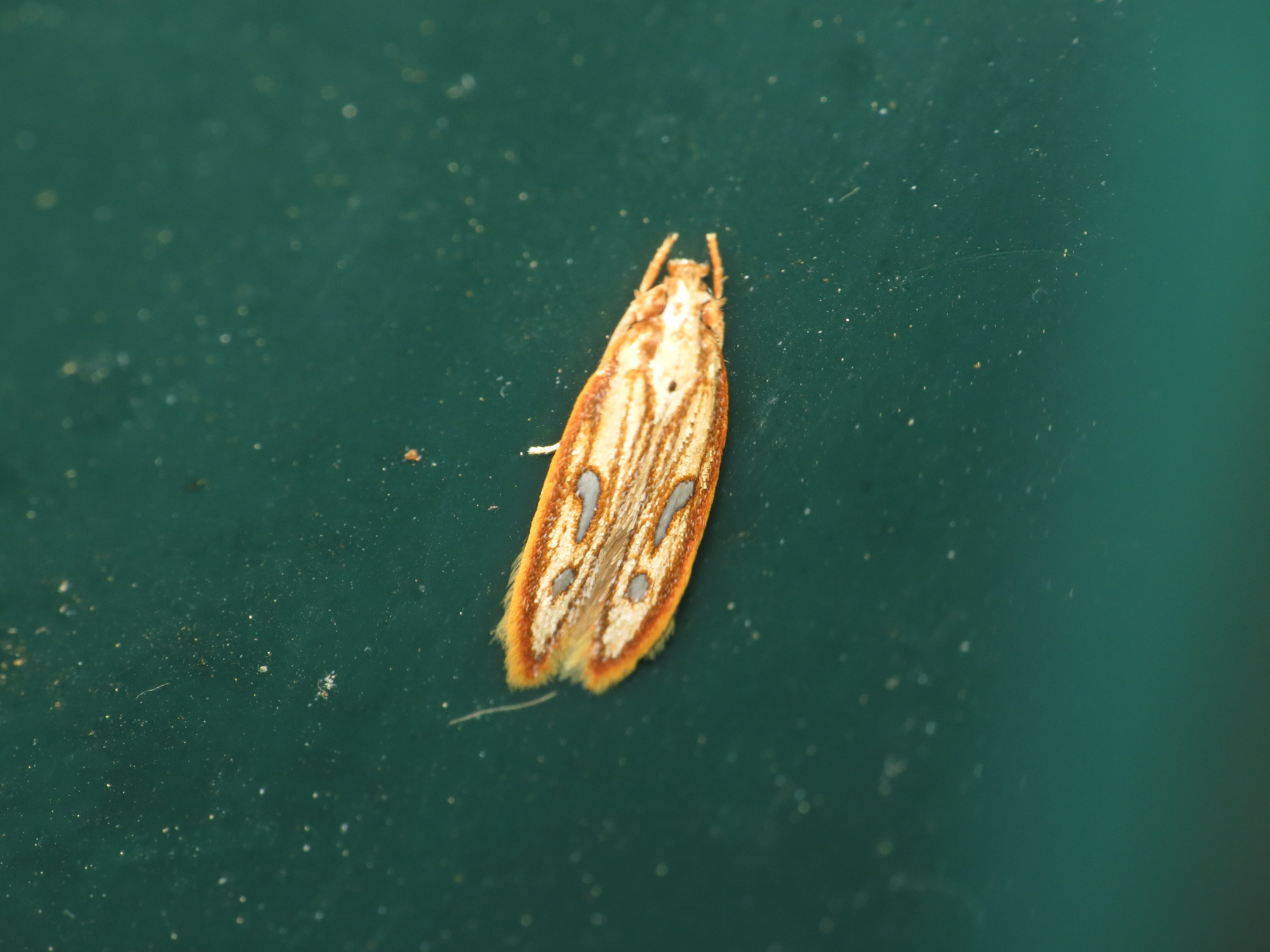
- Homaledra heptathalama is sometimes known as the "exclamation moth" - see the wing pattern

Scientific classification
- Kingdom: Animalia
- Phylum: Arthropoda
- Clade: Pancrustacea
- Class: Insecta
- Order: Lepidoptera
- Infraorder: Heteroneura
- Clade: Eulepidoptera
- Clade: Ditrysia
- Clade: Apoditrysia
- Superfamily: Gelechioidea
- Family: Pterolonchidae; Meyrick, 1918 ex. T.B. Fletcher, 1929

Synonyms
- Coelopoetidae; Syringopaidae

= Pterolonchidae =

Family of moths

Pterolonchidae is a small family of very small moths in the superfamily Gelechioidea. There are species native to every continent except Australia and Antarctica.

== Taxonomy and systematics ==
As of 2014 the family may be considered to consist of the following seven genera:

- Anathyrsa Meyrick, 1920 - 1 species
- Coelopoeta Walsingham, 1907 - 3 species
- Houdinia Hoare, Dugdale & Watts, 2006 - 1 species
- Homaledra Busck, 1900 - 4 species
- Plexippica Meyrick, 1912 - 2 species
- Pterolonche Zeller, 1847 - 7 species
- Syringopais Hering, 1919 - 1 species

The family Pterolonchidae was first named by Edward Meyrick in 1918. Meyrick omitted a description, thus the family was a nomen nudum, until Thomas Bainbrigge Fletcher provided the first description of the family in 1929.

In 1987 (the journal volume is dated to 1986, but this issue was published the following year) Antonio Vives Moreno published a revision of the family. Vives included seven species in two genera in the family (Pterolonche and the monotypic Anathyrsa), describing two new species and synonymising one species within the genus Pterolonche. He also published a new subgeneric classification for Pterolonche: the subgenera Agenjius and Gomezbustillus to classify respectively two species native to southern Andalucia and the northwestern Maghreb, and one species native to Sicily.

In 1999 Ron Hodges classified the group as the subfamily Pterolonchinae of the family Coleophoridae, including eight species in two genera (still Pterolonche and Anathyrsa). His classification was based on morphology (as all other classifications had been constructed up until this time).

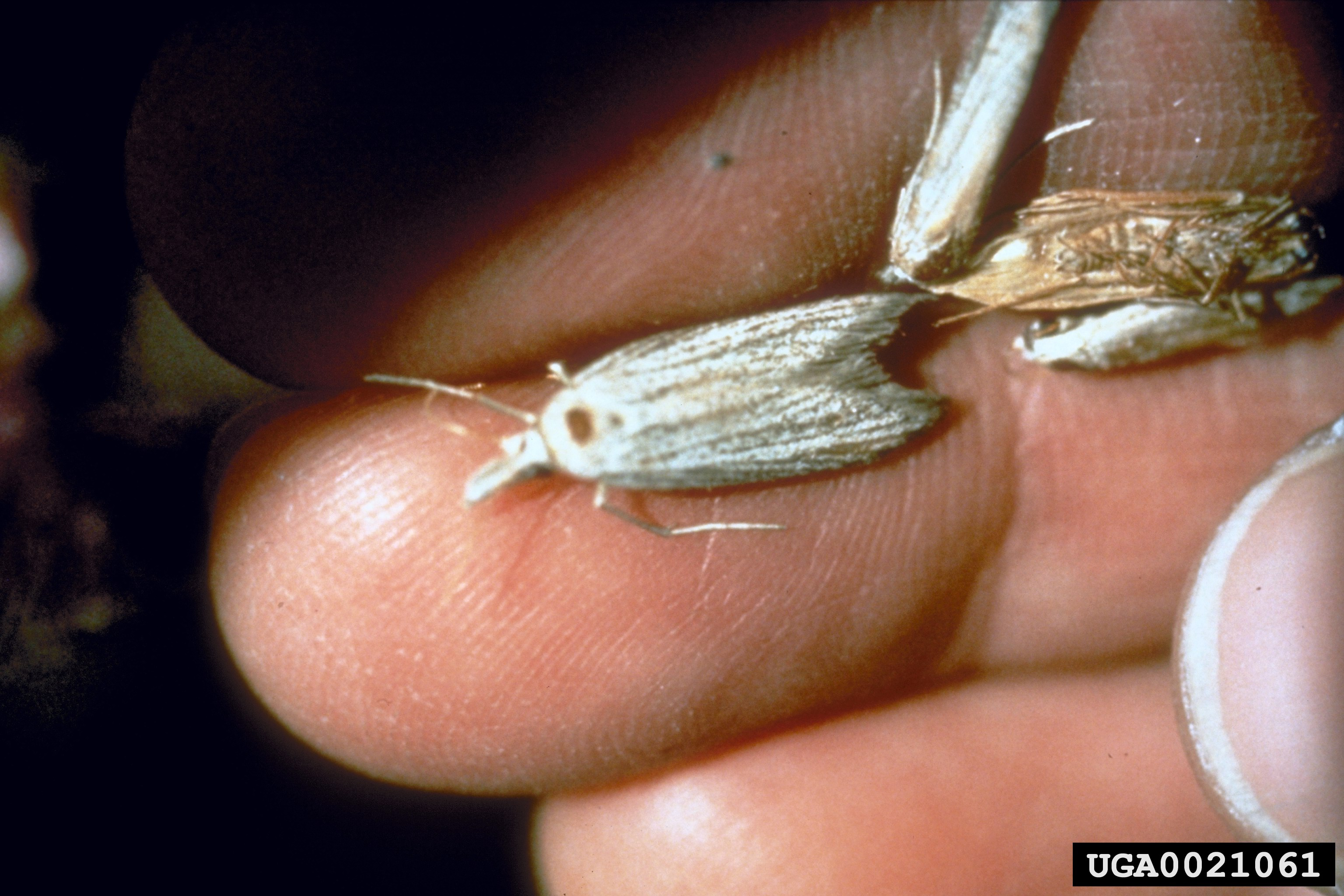
Adults of Pterolonche inspersa

In WikiSpecies in 2008, the Pterolonchidae mysteriously included:

- Phthinostoma Meyrick, 1914
- Pterolonche Zeller, 1847

In Zhi-Qiang Zhang's 2011 attempt to number all the known animal species of earth, van Nieukerken et al., the authors of the section on Lepidoptera, followed the works of Vives in 1987 and Hodges in 1999 regarding the Pterolonchidae. They recognised the Coelopoetidae and Syringopaidae as distinct families. In their taxonomic interpretation, the family Pterolonchidae was circumscribed by Edward Meyrick in 1918, and comprised eight species in two genera.

Plexippica had originally been described as an independent monotypic genus by Edward Meyrick in 1912, but the single species was moved to the genus Pterolonche by him in 1924 (making Plexippica a synonym of Pterolonche). Nonetheless the lone taxon found itself classified as a member of the Yponomeutinae subfamily of the Yponomeutidae family in the Yponomeutoidea superfamily under its old name. The species was then rediscovered in South Africa and described as the new genus Kruegerius by Vives in 1999, and was placed in the Pterolonchidae by him, but in 2011 Wolfram Mey re-recognised Plexippica, synonymised Kruegerius with Plexippica, moved the genus to the Pterolonchidae yet again, and described a new second species in the genus.

Three years later, in 2014, a cladistic analysis by Heikkilä et al. added the genera Homaledra and Houdinia to the Pterolonchidae from the family Batrachedridae, moved the two enigmatic genera Coelopoeta and Syringopais from respectively the Elachistidae and the Deoclonidae as monotypic subfamilies within the Pterolonchidae, and two genera were included besides the type genus within a new subfamily Pterolonchinae:

- Coelopoetinae (Hodges, 1978)
  - Coelopoeta Walsingham, 1907
- Pterolonchinae Meyrick, 1918
  - Anathyrsa Meyrick, 1920
  - Plexippica Meyrick, 1912
  - Pterolonche Zeller, 1847
    - Pterolonche
    - Agenjius Vives, 1987
    - Gomezbustillus Vives, 1987
- Syringopainae (Hodges, 1999)
  - Syringopais Hering, 1919
- Unplaced as to subfamily
  - Homaledra Busck, 1900
  - Houdinia Hoare, Dugdale & Watts, 2006

== Distribution ==
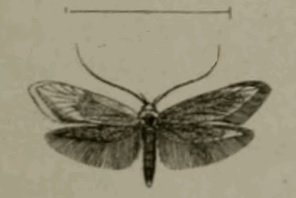
A drawing of Syringopais temperatella

The genus Pterolonche is found around the Mediterranean Sea, occurring in Portugal, Spain (including the Islas de Cabreras), France, Italy (Sicily, Sardinia), Malta, Hungary, Romania, areas within the territory of the former Yugoslavia, Crete, Cyprus, Anatolia, Iraq (Kurdistan Region), Lower Egypt, eastern Tunisia, northwestern Algeria and northern Morocco. Anathyrsa is restricted to southern South Africa. The two Plexippica species are found in Southern Africa.

Coelopoeta is native to western North America, from California to the Yukon. The only species of Syringopais, S. temperatella, is found on Cyprus, in Greece and the Near East from Israel and Turkey to western Iran.

Two species of Homaledra are known from South America, and two are from North America. Houdinia is restricted to an area in the north of the North Island of New Zealand.

== Ecology ==
Both genera Anathyrsa and Pterolonche are nocturnal. In Pterolonche both sexes are attracted to lamps at night and are easy to collect. Syringopais temperatella imagoes are active both day and night in May in Turkey, and lay their eggs in the summer, with the caterpillars emerging in the winter and early spring. Homaledra builds elaborate feeding chambers of silk under which the caterpillars hide.

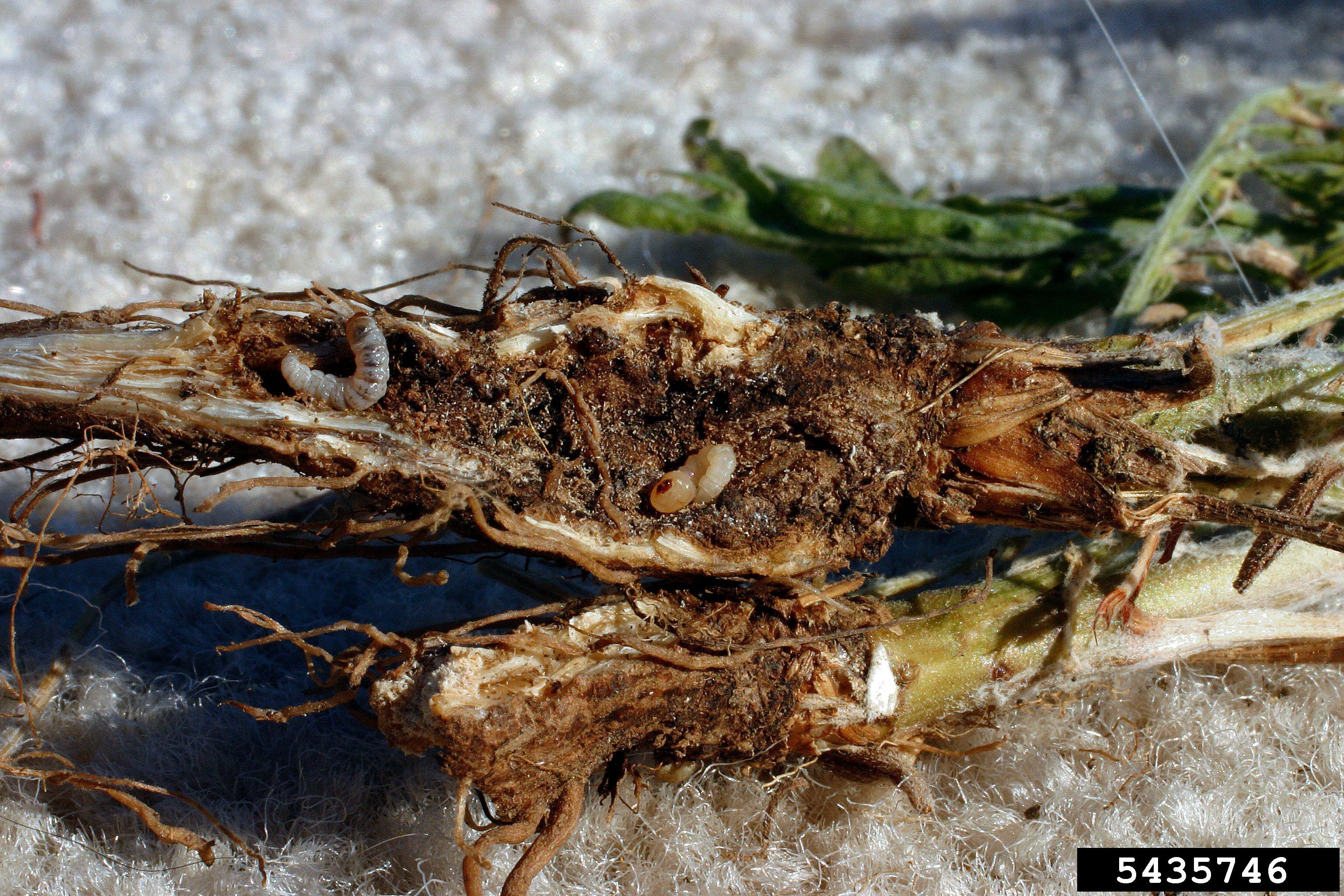
Pterolonche inspersa larvae infesting the roots of a Centaurea species.

Coelopoeta caterpillars mine in the leaves of Boraginaceae, which in one species creates a gall-like deformation. Homaledra feeds on the undersides of the leaves of palms. Houdinia mines in Restionaceae and Syringopais in grasses.

== Uses ==
Pterolonche inspersa was released as a biological control agent for knapweed, Centaurea diffusa, in Colorado, Montana, and Oregon in the mid to late 1980s, although there was no known establishment of the species in the United States initially, it has since spread to Idaho and British Columbia. Syringopais temperatella is sometimes a major agricultural pest of wheat and barley in Cyprus, Jordan, Iraq and Iran.
