= List of moths of Australia (Hypertrophidae) =

Partial list of Australian moths

This is a list of the Australian moth species of the family Hypertrophidae. It also acts as an index to the species articles and forms part of the full List of moths of Australia.

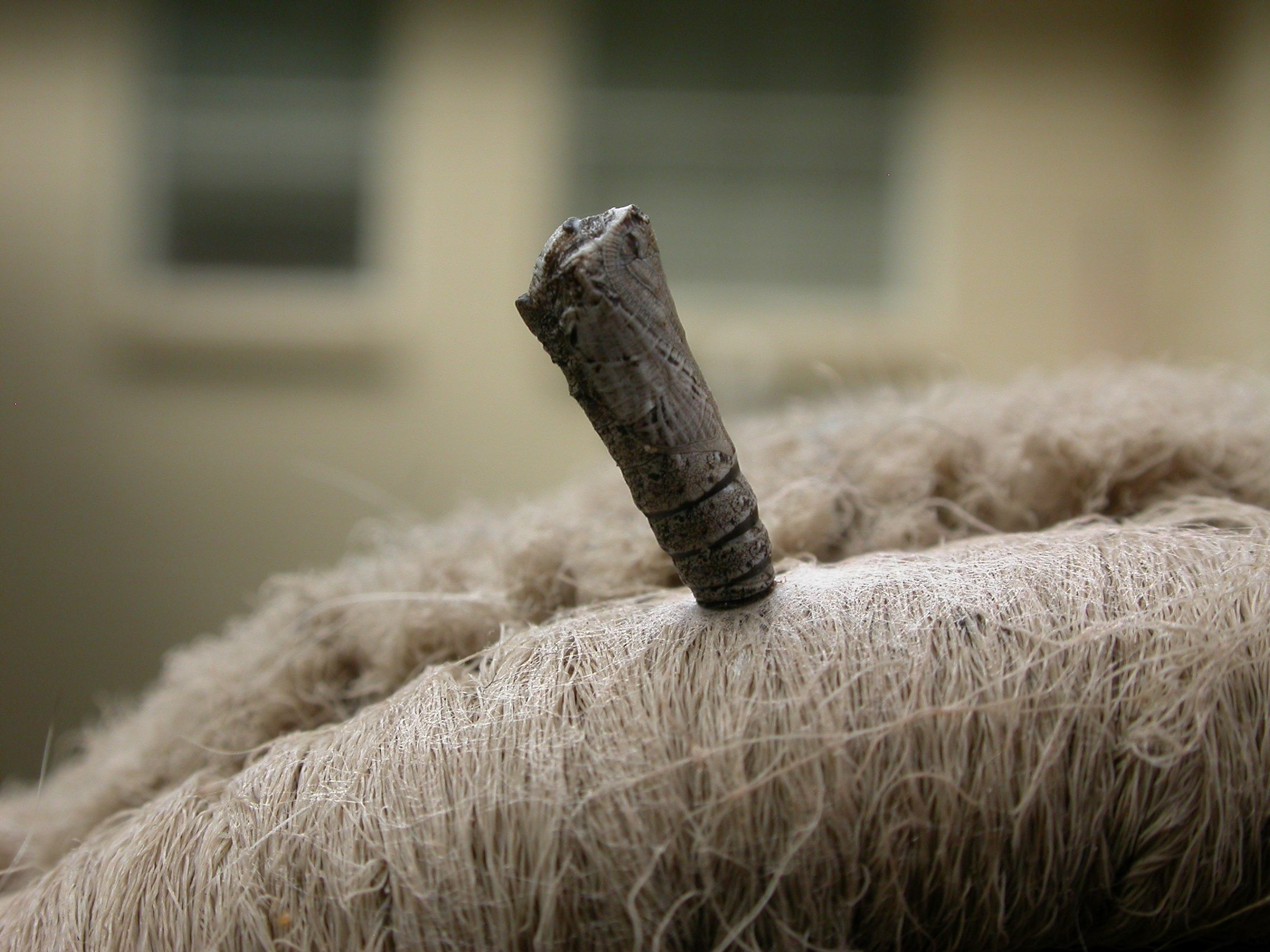
Pupa of a Hypertrophidae species

- Acraephnes cryeropis (Turner, 1947)
- Acraephnes innubila (Turner, 1927)
- Acraephnes inscripta (Turner, 1947)
- Acraephnes litodes (Turner, 1947)
- Acraephnes nitida Turner, 1947
- Acraephnes nivea Turner, 1947
- Acraephnes sulfurata (Meyrick, 1907)
- Allotropha percussana (Walker, 1864)
- Callizyga dispar Turner, 1894
- Eomystis rhodopis Meyrick, 1888
- Epithetica typhoscia Turner, 1923
- Eupselia anommata Turner, 1898
- Eupselia aristonica Meyrick, 1880
- Eupselia axiepaena Turner, 1947
- Eupselia beatella (Walker, 1864)
- Eupselia beltera Turner, 1947
- Eupselia callidyas Meyrick, 1915
- Eupselia carpocapsella (Walker, 1864)
- Eupselia holoxantha Lower, 1894
- Eupselia hypsichora Meyrick, 1906
- Eupselia iridizona Lower, 1899
- Eupselia leucaspis Meyrick, 1906
- Eupselia melanostrepta Meyrick, 1880
- Eupselia philomorpha Lower, 1901
- Eupselia satrapella Meyrick, 1880
- Eupselia syncapna Meyrick, 1920
- Eupselia theorella Meyrick, 1880
- Eupselia tristephana Meyrick, 1915
- Hypertropha chlaenota Meyrick, 1887
- Hypertropha desumptana (Walker, 1863)
- Hypertropha thesaurella Meyrick, 1882
- Hypertropha tortriciformis (Guenée, 1852)
- Oxytropha ametalla (Turner, 1898)
- Peritropha oligodrachma Diakonoff, 1954
- Progonica rhothias (Meyrick, 1906)
- Thudaca calliphrontis Meyrick, 1892
- Thudaca campylota Meyrick, 1892
- Thudaca circumdatella (Walker, 1864)
- Thudaca crypsidesma Meyrick, 1893
- Thudaca cymatistis Meyrick, 1893
- Thudaca haplonota Meyrick, 1892
- Thudaca heterastis Meyrick, 1892
- Thudaca mimodora Meyrick, 1892
- Thudaca monolechria Turner, 1947
- Thudaca obliquella Walker, 1864
- Thudaca ophiosema Meyrick, 1892
- Thudaca orthodroma Meyrick, 1892
- Thudaca stadiaula Meyrick, 1892
- Thudaca trabeata Meyrick, 1892
