= Eupselia isacta =

Scientific classification
- Kingdom: Animalia
- Phylum: Arthropoda
- Class: Insecta
- Order: Lepidoptera
- Family: Oecophoridae
- Genus: Eupselia
- Species: E. isacta

Binomial name
- Eupselia isacta Meyrick, 1910

Species of moth

Eupselia isacta is a moth in the family Depressariidae. It was described by Edward Meyrick in 1910. It is found in southern India.

The wingspan is 13–14 mm. The forewings are ochreous yellow with the base of the costa ferruginous, the edge sometimes dark fuscous. There is a dark brown transverse median fascia, the anterior edge suffused into the ground colour, the posterior sharply limited by a white line. There is more or less brownish suffusion towards the termen. The hindwings are fuscous or dark fuscous.
