= Polygiton =

Scientific classification
- Kingdom: Animalia
- Phylum: Arthropoda
- Clade: Pancrustacea
- Class: Insecta
- Order: Lepidoptera
- Family: Oecophoridae
- Subfamily: Hypertrophinae
- Genus: Polygiton; Diakonoff, 1955
- Species: P. pachypus

Binomial name
- Polygiton pachypus Diakonoff, 1955

Species of moth

Polygiton pachypus is a moth in the family Depressariidae, and the only species in the genus Polygiton. It was described by Alexey Diakonoff in 1955 and is found in New Guinea.
