= Epithetica =

Scientific classification
- Kingdom: Animalia
- Phylum: Arthropoda
- Class: Insecta
- Order: Lepidoptera
- Family: Oecophoridae
- Subfamily: Hypertrophinae
- Genus: Epithetica; Turner, 1923
- Species: E. typhoscia

Binomial name
- Epithetica typhoscia Turner, 1923

Species of moth

Epithetica typhoscia is a moth in the family Depressariidae, and the only species in the genus Epithetica. It was described by Alfred Jefferis Turner in 1923 and is found in Australia, where it has been recorded from New South Wales.

The wingspan is 14–15 mm. The forewings are dark fuscous with a suffused brown subbasal fascia and a brown incomplete fascia from the dorsum before the middle, reaching three-fourths across the disc, edged anteriorly with grey. Immediately after this, a suffused grey fascia runs from the midcosta to beyond the middorsum, in it a fine black line from two-fifths costa to three-fourths the dorsum. Another grey fascia containing a dark line is found from three-fourths of the costa to the termen above the tornus. The terminal edge is fuscous preceded by a grey line. The hindwings are dark fuscous.
