= Callizyga =

Scientific classification
- Kingdom: Animalia
- Phylum: Arthropoda
- Class: Insecta
- Order: Lepidoptera
- Family: Oecophoridae
- Subfamily: Hypertrophinae
- Genus: Callizyga; Turner, 1894
- Species: C. dispar

Binomial name
- Callizyga dispar Turner, 1894

Species of moth

Callizyga dispar is a moth in the family Depressariidae, and the only species in the genus Callizyga. It was described by Alfred Jefferis Turner in 1894 and is found in Australia, where it has been recorded from Queensland and New South Wales.

The wingspan is 21–22 mm for males and 31–35 mm for females. The forewings of the males are ochreous-grey, with a slight pinkish tinge and a few scattered fuscous scales, sometimes forming a streak from the hindmargin below the apex towards centre of the disc. In females, the forewings are pinkish-grey, with a slight ochreous tinge and a few scattered fuscous scales towards the hindmargin. The hindwings are bright orange-yellow in males. Those of the females are pale ochreous-yellow.
