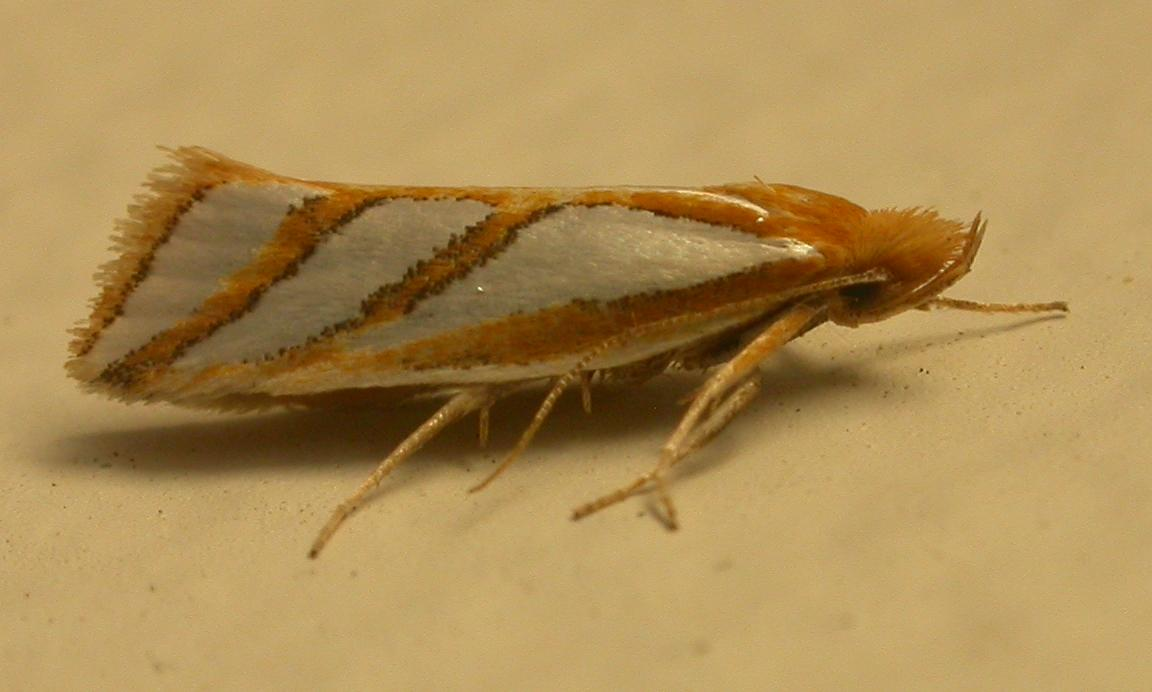
- Thudaca mimodora Meyrick, 1892, Black Mountain, Canberra

Scientific classification
- Kingdom: Animalia
- Phylum: Arthropoda
- Clade: Pancrustacea
- Class: Insecta
- Order: Lepidoptera
- Family: Depressariidae
- Subfamily: Hypertrophinae
- Genus: Thudaca; Walker, 1864

= Thudaca =

Genus of moths

Thudaca is a moth genus of the family Depressariidae.

== Species ==
- Thudaca calliphrontis Meyrick, 1893
- Thudaca campylota Meyrick, 1893
- Thudaca circumdatella (Walker, 1864)
- Thudaca crypsidesma Meyrick, 1893
- Thudaca cymatistis Meyrick, 1893
- Thudaca haplonota Meyrick, 1893
- Thudaca heterastis Meyrick, 1893
- Thudaca mimodora Meyrick, 1893
- Thudaca monolechria Turner, 1947
- Thudaca obliquella Walker, 1864
- Thudaca ophiosema Meyrick, 1893
- Thudaca orthodroma Meyrick, 1893
- Thudaca stadiaula Meyrick, 1893
- Thudaca trabeata Meyrick, 1893
