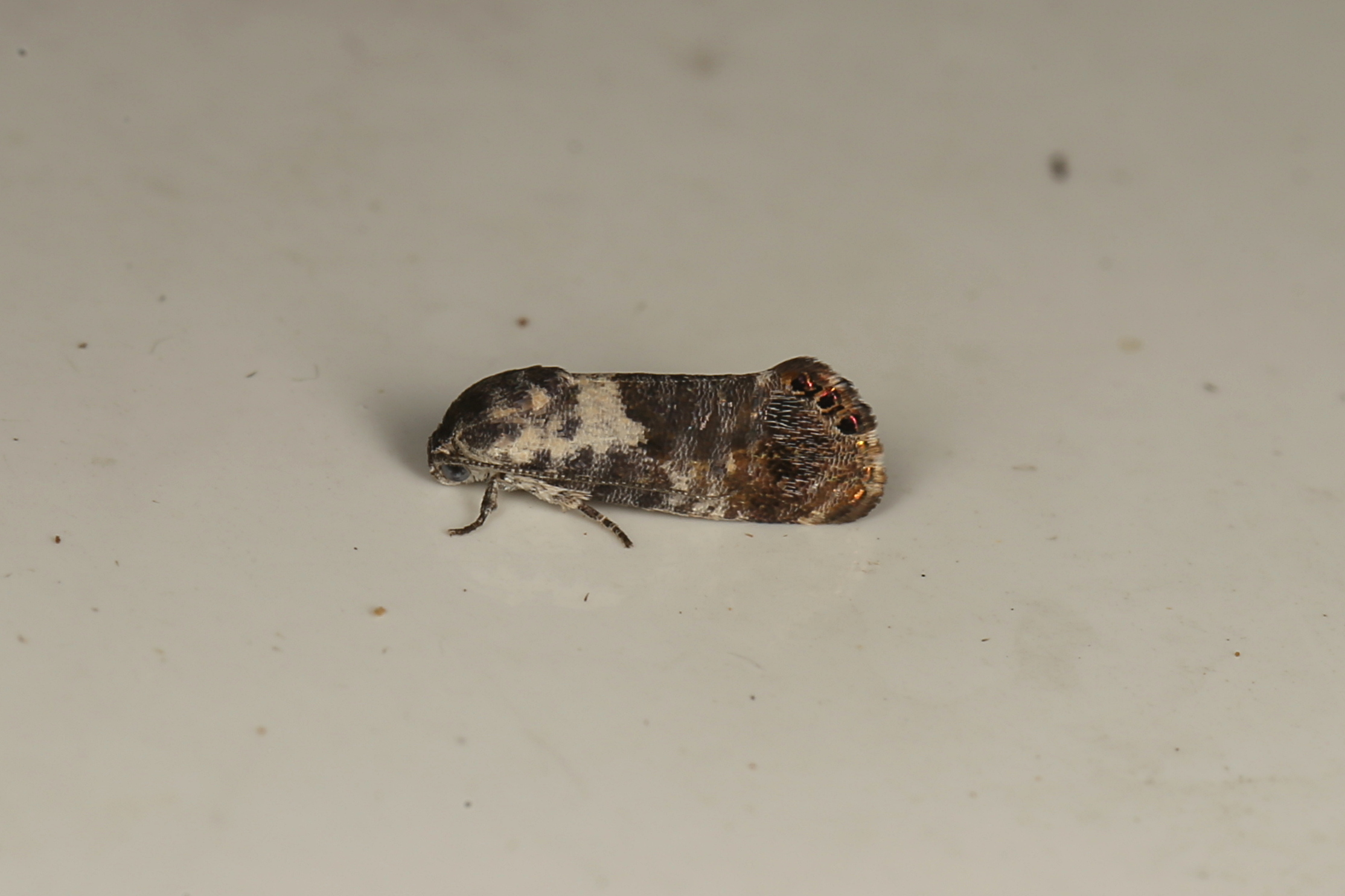
- Eupselia metabola Turner, 1947, to actinic light, Terrick Terrick National Park, VIC, Australia, 21/22 January 2017

Scientific classification
- Kingdom: Animalia
- Phylum: Arthropoda
- Class: Insecta
- Order: Lepidoptera
- Family: Oecophoridae
- Genus: Eupselia
- Species: E. metabola

Binomial name
- Eupselia metabola Turner, 1947

= Eupselia metabola =

Species of moth

Eupselia metabola is a moth in the family Depressariidae. It was described by Alfred Jefferis Turner in 1947. It is found in Australia, where it has been recorded from Queensland.
