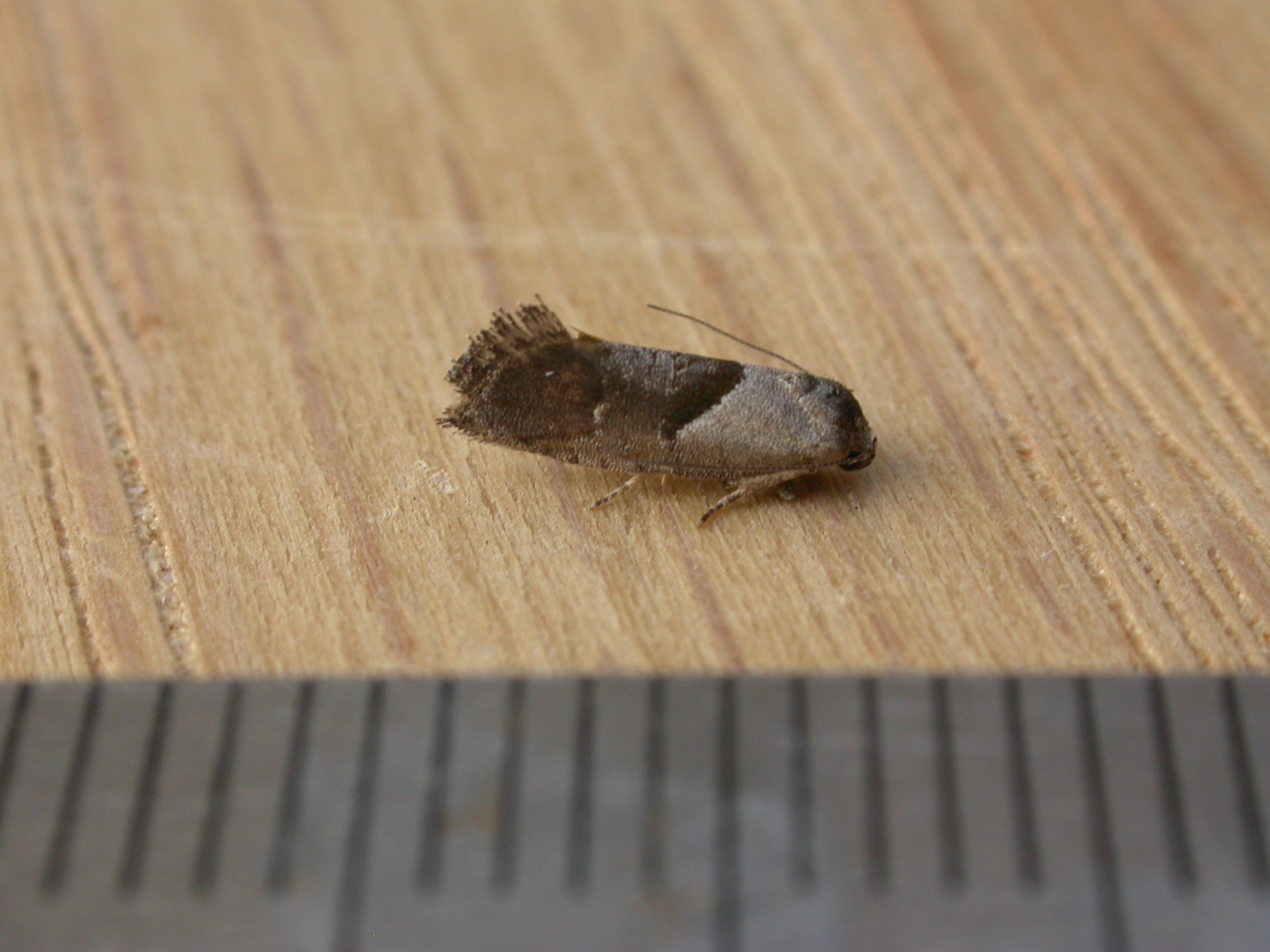
- Eupselia holoxantha

Scientific classification
- Kingdom: Animalia
- Phylum: Arthropoda
- Class: Insecta
- Order: Lepidoptera
- Family: Oecophoridae
- Subfamily: Hypertrophinae
- Genus: Eupselia; Meyrick, 1880

Synonyms
- Allodoxa Meyrick, 1883

= Eupselia =

Genus of moths

Eupselia is a moth genus of the family Depressariidae.

== Species ==
- Eupselia anommata Turner, 1898
- Eupselia aristonica Meyrick, 1880
- Eupselia axiepaena Turner, 1947
- Eupselia beatella (Walker, 1864)
- Eupselia beltera Turner, 1947
- Eupselia callidyas Meyrick, 1915
- Eupselia carpocapsella (Walker, 1864)
- Eupselia holoxantha Lower, 1894
- Eupselia hypsichora Meyrick, 1906
- Eupselia iridizona Lower, 1899
- Eupselia isacta Meyrick, 1910
- Eupselia leucaspis Meyrick, 1906
- Eupselia melanostrepta Meyrick, 1880
- Eupselia metabola Turner, 1947
- Eupselia philomorpha Lower, 1902
- Eupselia satrapella Meyrick, 1880
- Eupselia syncapna Meyrick, 1920
- Eupselia theorella Meyrick, 1880
- Eupselia tristephana Meyrick, 1915
