= Acraephnes =

Scientific classification
- Domain: Eukaryota
- Kingdom: Animalia
- Phylum: Arthropoda
- Class: Insecta
- Order: Lepidoptera
- Family: Oecophoridae
- Subfamily: Hypertrophinae
- Genus: Acraephnes; Turner, 1947

Synonyms
- Acraephanes Turner, 1947

Genus of moths

Acraephnes is a moth genus of the family Depressariidae.

== Species ==
- Acraephnes cryeropis (Turner, 1947)
- Acraephnes innubila (Turner, 1927)
- Acraephnes inscripta (Turner, 1947)
- Acraephnes litodes (Turner, 1947)
- Acraephnes nitida Turner, 1947
- Acraephnes nivea Turner, 1947
- Acraephnes sulfurata (Meyrick, 1907)
