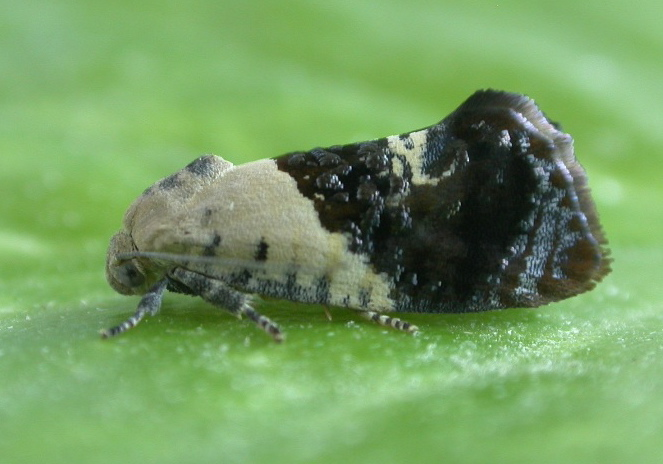
- Hypertropha chlaenota

Scientific classification
- Kingdom: Animalia
- Phylum: Arthropoda
- Class: Insecta
- Order: Lepidoptera
- Family: Oecophoridae
- Subfamily: Hypertrophinae
- Genus: Hypertropha; Meyrick, 1880

= Hypertropha =

Genus of moths

Hypertropha is a moth genus of the family Depressariidae.

== Species ==
- Hypertropha chlaenota Meyrick, 1887
- Hypertropha desumptana (Walker, 1863)
- Hypertropha thesaurella Meyrick, 1880
- Hypertropha tortriciformis (Boisduval & Guenée, 1852)
