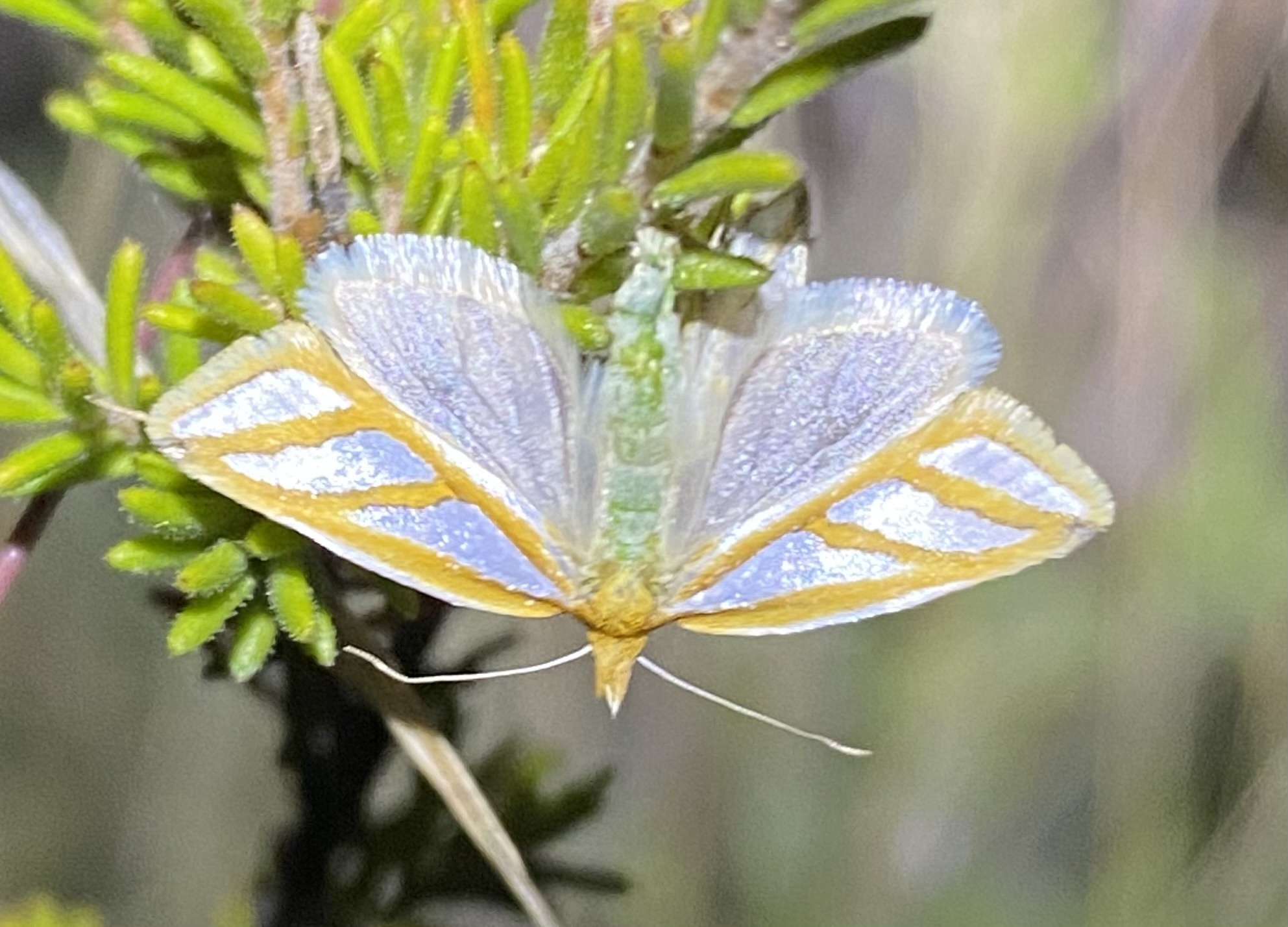

Scientific classification
- Kingdom: Animalia
- Phylum: Arthropoda
- Class: Insecta
- Order: Lepidoptera
- Family: Oecophoridae
- Genus: Thudaca
- Species: T. obliquella

Binomial name
- Thudaca obliquella Walker, 1864

= Thudaca obliquella =

Species of moth

Thudaca obliquella is a moth in the family Depressariidae. It was described by Francis Walker in 1864. It is found in Australia, where it has been recorded from New South Wales, Queensland, the Australian Capital Territory, Tasmania and South Australia.

The wingspan is 16–18 mm. Adults are similar to Thudaca mimodora, but the forewings have the first transverse streak without a dark bar above the middle, the second transverse streak is without a dark bar above the lower end and there is a blackish line along the hindmargin. The hindwings are lighter grey, suffused with pale whitish ochreous.
