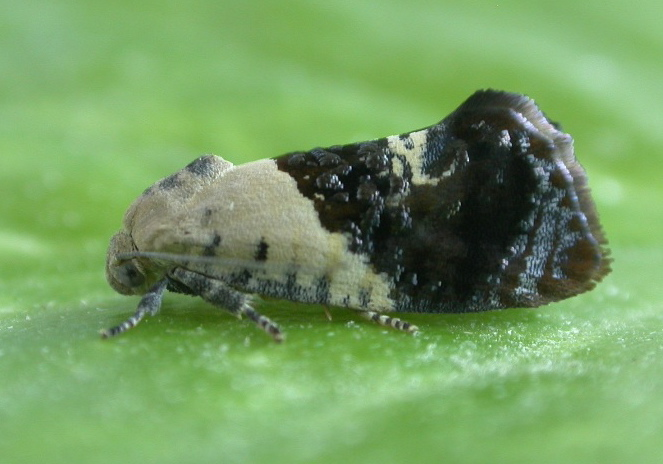
- Hypertropha chlaenota

Scientific classification
- Kingdom: Animalia
- Phylum: Arthropoda
- Class: Insecta
- Order: Lepidoptera
- Family: Oecophoridae
- Subfamily: Hypertrophinae; T. B. Fletcher, 1929

= Hypertrophinae =

Subfamily of moths

The Hypertrophinae are a subfamily of small moths in the family Depressariidae. The subfamily was described by Thomas Bainbrigge Fletcher in 1929.

== Taxonomy and systematics ==
- Acraephnes Turner, 1947
- Allotropha Diakonoff, 1954
- Callizyga Turner, 1894
- Eomystis Meyrick, 1888
- Epithetica Turner, 1923
- Eupselia Meyrick, 1880
- Hypertropha Meyrick, 1880
- Oxytropha Diakonoff, 1954
- Peritropha Diakonoff, 1954
- Polygiton Diakonoff, 1955
- Progonica Turner, 1947
- Thudaca Walker, 1864
