= Acraephnes sulfurata =

Scientific classification
- Kingdom: Animalia
- Phylum: Arthropoda
- Clade: Pancrustacea
- Class: Insecta
- Order: Lepidoptera
- Family: Depressariidae
- Genus: Acraephnes
- Species: A. sulfurata

Binomial name
- Acraephnes sulfurata (Meyrick, 1907)

Synonyms
- Anticrates sulfurata Meyrick, 1907

Species of moth

Acraephnes sulfurata is a moth in the family Depressariidae. It was described by Edward Meyrick in 1907. It is found in Australia, where it has been recorded from South Australia and Western Australia.

The wingspan is about 18 mm for males and 27 mm for females. The forewings are very pale shining brassy yellowish and the hindwings are white.
