= Eomystis =

Scientific classification
- Kingdom: Animalia
- Phylum: Arthropoda
- Class: Insecta
- Order: Lepidoptera
- Family: Oecophoridae
- Subfamily: Hypertrophinae
- Genus: Eomystis; Meyrick, 1888
- Species: E. rhodopis

Binomial name
- Eomystis rhodopis Meyrick, 1888

Genus of moths

Eomystis is a monotypic moth genus in the family Depressariidae. Its only species, Eomystis rhodopis, has been recorded from the Australian state of Western Australia. Both the genus and species were first described by Edward Meyrick in 1888.

The wingspan is about 25 mm. The forewings are bright yellow ochreous, mixed with crimson rosy and with a crimson dot in the disc at two-thirds. The hindwings are pale ochreous yellowish.
