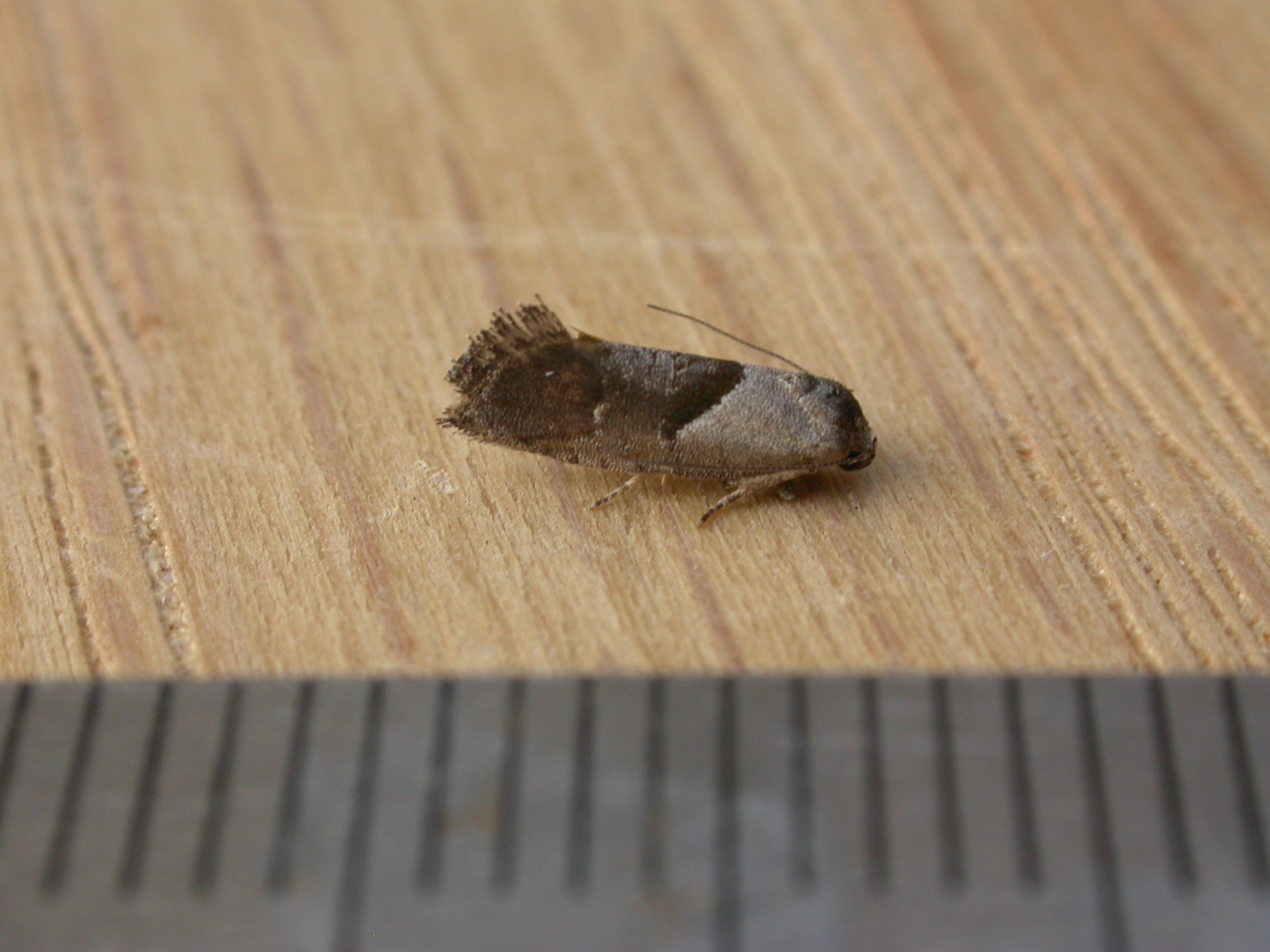

Scientific classification
- Domain: Eukaryota
- Kingdom: Animalia
- Phylum: Arthropoda
- Class: Insecta
- Order: Lepidoptera
- Family: Oecophoridae
- Genus: Eupselia
- Species: E. holoxantha

Binomial name
- Eupselia holoxantha Lower, 1894

= Eupselia holoxantha =

Species of moth

Eupselia holoxantha is a species of moth of the family Depressariidae. It is found in Australia, where it has been recorded from Queensland, New South Wales, the Australian Capital Territory and South Australia.

The wingspan is about 20 mm. The basal third of the forewings is cream, while the marginal two thirds are dark brown. The hindwings are yellow.

The larvae are thought to feed on the foliage of Eucalyptus species.
