= Eupselia beltera =

Scientific classification
- Domain: Eukaryota
- Kingdom: Animalia
- Phylum: Arthropoda
- Class: Insecta
- Order: Lepidoptera
- Family: Oecophoridae
- Genus: Eupselia
- Species: E. beltera

Binomial name
- Eupselia beltera Turner, 1947

Species of moth

Eupselia beltera is a moth in the family Depressariidae. It was described by Alfred Jefferis Turner in 1947. It is found in Australia, where it has been recorded from Queensland, New South Wales, Victoria, South Australia and Western Australia.

The larvae are thought to feed on the foliage of Eucalyptus species.
