= Eupselia callidyas =

Scientific classification
- Kingdom: Animalia
- Phylum: Arthropoda
- Class: Insecta
- Order: Lepidoptera
- Family: Oecophoridae
- Genus: Eupselia
- Species: E. callidyas

Binomial name
- Eupselia callidyas Meyrick, 1915

Species of moth

Eupselia callidyas is a moth in the family Depressariidae. It was described by Edward Meyrick in 1915. It is found in Australia, where it has been recorded from the Northern Territory.

The wingspan is 12–13 mm. The forewings are dark bronzy fuscous with the basal area tinged with rosy purple and with an erect elongate-triangular light ochreous-yellow blotch from the dorsum before the middle nearly reaching the costa. There are two light yellowish spots on the costa towards the middle, where two parallel bright coppery-blue-purple lines run direct to the dorsum. Two oblique transverse coppery-blue-purple lines are found before the apex and there is a black streak along the lower portion of the termen containing three small round black spots set in whitish-ochreous rings becoming golden metallic on the terminal edge. There is also a light purple-brownish ovate blotch lying along this streak and limited above by the first pre-apical line, minutely strigulated longitudinally with darker purple brown sprinkled with blackish specks. The hindwings are dark grey.
