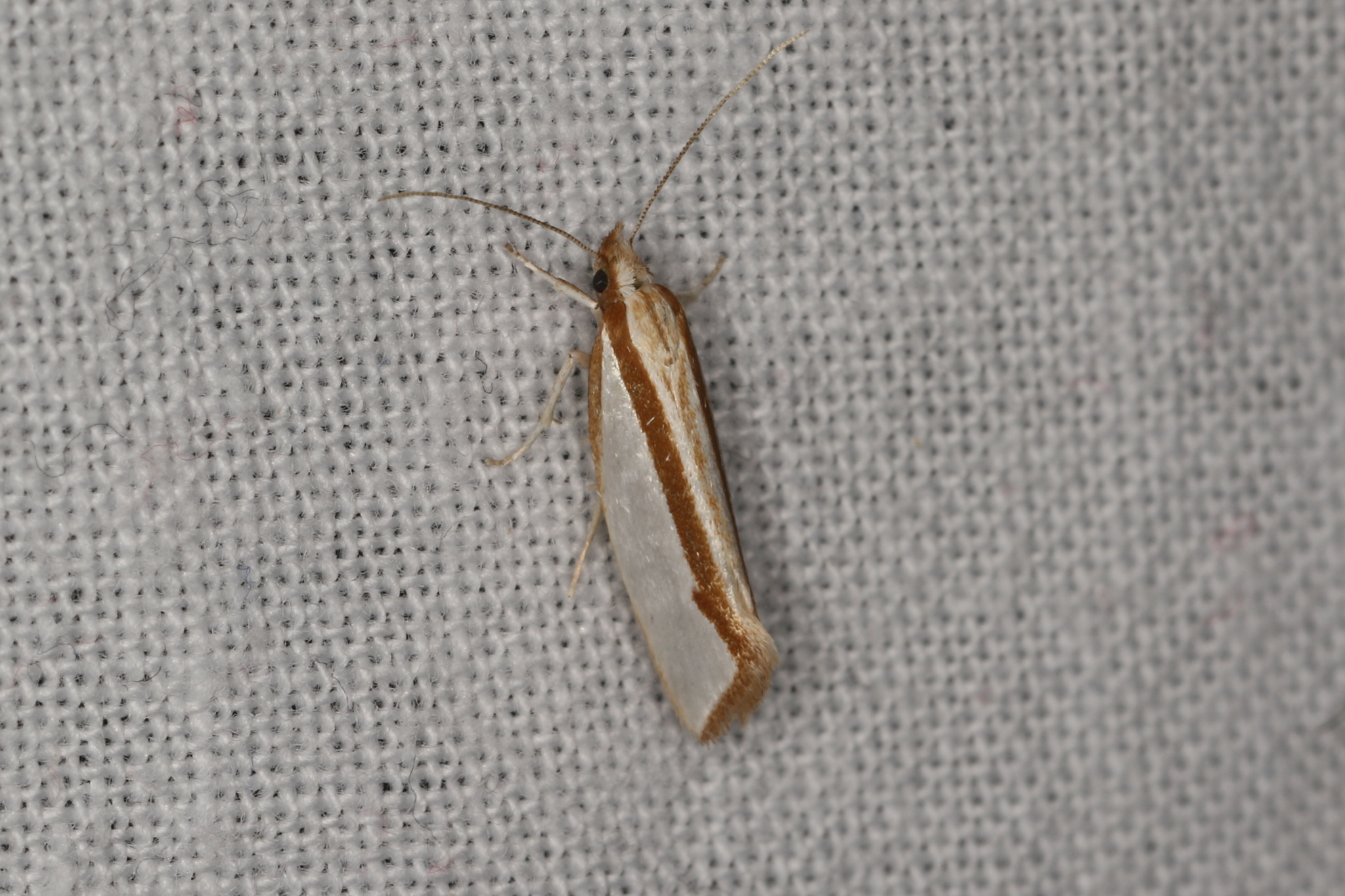

Scientific classification
- Kingdom: Animalia
- Phylum: Arthropoda
- Class: Insecta
- Order: Lepidoptera
- Family: Oecophoridae
- Genus: Thudaca
- Species: T. circumdatella

Binomial name
- Thudaca circumdatella (Walker, 1864)

Synonyms
- Tonza circumdatella Walker, 1864

= Thudaca circumdatella =

Species of moth

Thudaca circumdatella is a moth in the family Depressariidae. It was described by Francis Walker in 1865. It is found in Australia, where it has been recorded from New South Wales.

The wingspan is 15–16 mm. The forewings are snow white with a suffused brownish-ochreous streak along the basal half of the costa, attenuated and very indistinct posteriorly. There is a straight brownish-orange subdorsal streak from the base to the anal angle, the upper edge with short triangular projection near the extremity. The hindwings are ochreous-grey whitish.
