= Acraephnes nitida =

Scientific classification
- Kingdom: Animalia
- Phylum: Arthropoda
- Clade: Pancrustacea
- Class: Insecta
- Order: Lepidoptera
- Family: Depressariidae
- Genus: Acraephnes
- Species: A. nitida

Binomial name
- Acraephnes nitida Turner, 1947

Species of moth

Acraephnes nitida is a moth in the family Depressariidae. It was described by Alfred Jefferis Turner in 1947. It is found in Australia, where it has been recorded from Western Australia.

The wingspan is 16–20 mm. The forewings are shining white and the hindwings are white.
