= Eupselia theorella =

Scientific classification
- Domain: Eukaryota
- Kingdom: Animalia
- Phylum: Arthropoda
- Class: Insecta
- Order: Lepidoptera
- Family: Oecophoridae
- Genus: Eupselia
- Species: E. theorella

Binomial name
- Eupselia theorella Meyrick, 1880

Species of moth

Eupselia theorella is a moth in the family Depressariidae. It was described by Edward Meyrick in 1880. It is found in Australia, where it has been recorded from New South Wales.

The wingspan is about 15 mm. The forewings are ochreous brown, thickly irrorated with paler scales, becoming elongate hair scales towards the lower portion of the hind margin. There are about ten very obscure and faint transverse streaks from the costa, caused by the disappearance of the pale scales, some of them faintly continued to the inner margin, two in the middle of the wing more distinct, rather divergent on the disc, confluent on the inner margin and forming there a transversely elongate metallic-ochreous spot, becoming ochreous white on the inner margin itself. There is an oblique ocbreous-brown streak from three-fourths of the costa to the hind margin beneath the apex, and an oval ocbreous-brown spot at the apex, as well as five round black spots very close together below the middle of the hind margin. A violet-metallic line is found on the base of the cilia, broken into spots, especially towards the apex. The rest of the cilia is ochreous fuscous, towards the apex blackish, with two small whitish spots on the tips beneath the apex. The hindwings have the basal half yellow with a few scattered dark fuscous scales, while the apical half is dark fuscous, sending a cloudy protuberance inwards above the middle.
