= Eupselia syncapna =

Scientific classification
- Kingdom: Animalia
- Phylum: Arthropoda
- Class: Insecta
- Order: Lepidoptera
- Family: Oecophoridae
- Genus: Eupselia
- Species: E. syncapna

Binomial name
- Eupselia syncapna Meyrick, 1920

Species of moth

Eupselia syncapna is a moth in the family Depressariidae. It was described by Edward Meyrick in 1920. It is found in Australia, where it has been recorded from Queensland.

The wingspan is about 11 millimetres (0.43 in). The forewings are dark purplish fuscous, on the median area with obscure dark brownish transverse incomplete stride and with a slightly oblique dark brown streak from the middle of the dorsum reaching half across the wing, edged anteriorly with some obscure whitish irroration. There is an obscure pale fuscous transverse mark on the end of the cell. The hindwings are pale ochreous yellow, the apex and termen slenderly suffused dark fuscous.
