= Eupselia iridizona =

Scientific classification
- Domain: Eukaryota
- Kingdom: Animalia
- Phylum: Arthropoda
- Class: Insecta
- Order: Lepidoptera
- Family: Oecophoridae
- Genus: Eupselia
- Species: E. iridizona

Binomial name
- Eupselia iridizona Lower, 1899

Species of moth

Eupselia iridizona is a moth in the family Depressariidae. It was described by Oswald Bertram Lower in 1899. It is found in Australia, where it has been recorded from Victoria.

The wingspan is about 10 mm. The forewings are yellow with a broad purplish-fuscous hindmarginal patch occupying the posterior third of the wing, the anterior edge hardly straight, sinuate beneath the costa, then very slightly curved outwards to the inner margin. Near the anterior edge of the patch are two transverse lines of reddish purple, not reaching either margin. A few black scales are found around the anal angle. The hindwings are dark fuscous, somewhat bronzy tinged.
