= Acraephnes innubila =

Scientific classification
- Kingdom: Animalia
- Phylum: Arthropoda
- Clade: Pancrustacea
- Class: Insecta
- Order: Lepidoptera
- Family: Depressariidae
- Genus: Acraephnes
- Species: A. innubila

Binomial name
- Acraephnes innubila (Turner, 1927)

Synonyms
- Thudaca innubila Turner, 1927

Species of moth

Acraephnes innubila is a moth in the family Depressariidae. It was described by Alfred Jefferis Turner in 1927. It is found in Australia, where it has been recorded from Tasmania.
