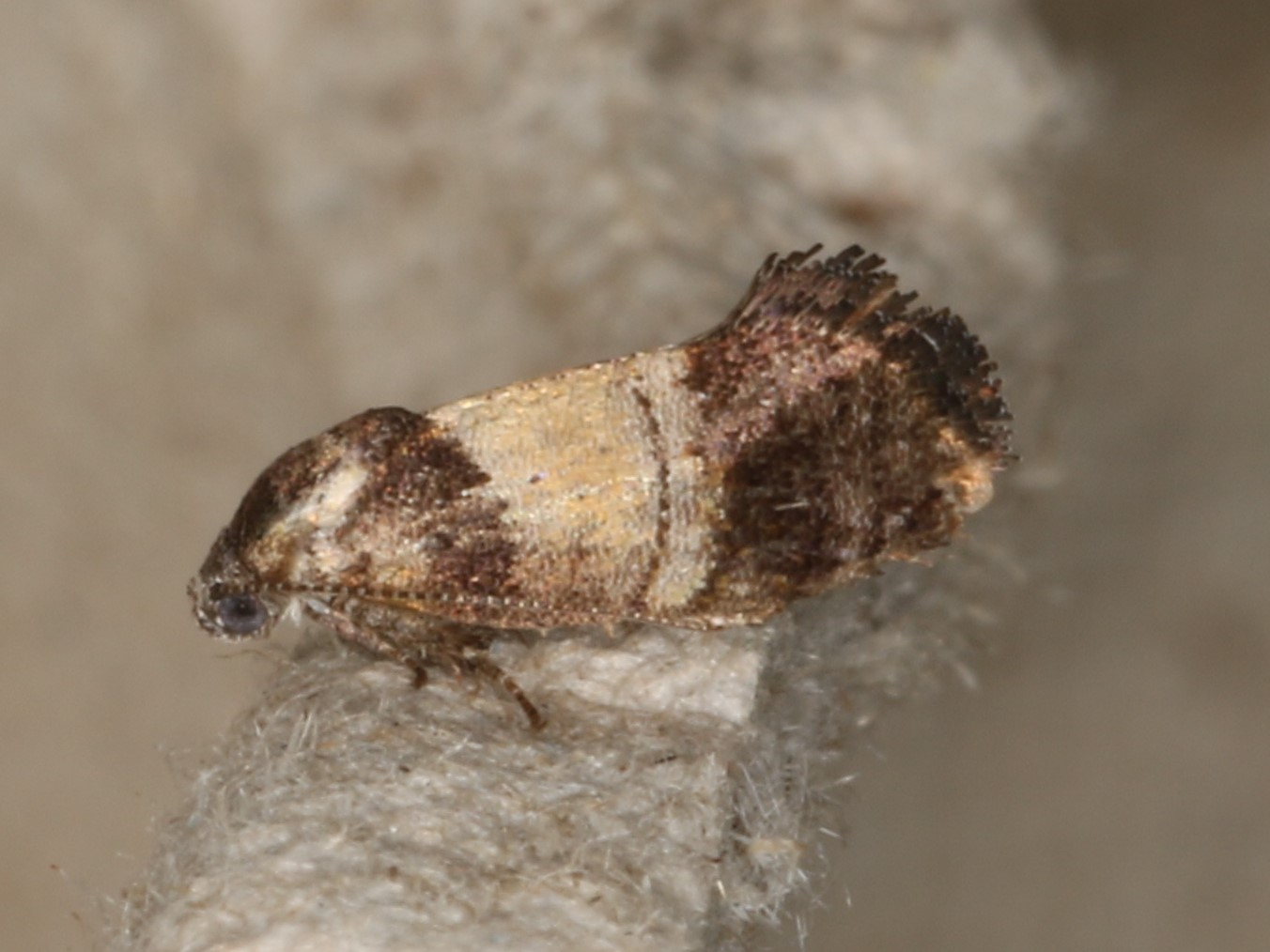
- In Heath trap, Aranda, ACT, Australia

Scientific classification
- Domain: Eukaryota
- Kingdom: Animalia
- Phylum: Arthropoda
- Class: Insecta
- Order: Lepidoptera
- Family: Oecophoridae
- Genus: Eupselia
- Species: E. axiepaena

Binomial name
- Eupselia axiepaena Turner, 1947

= Eupselia axiepaena =

Species of moth

Eupselia axiepaena is a species of moth in the family Depressariidae. It was first described by Alfred Jefferis Turner in 1947. It is found in Australia, where it has been recorded from Queensland.
