= Acraephnes litodes =

Scientific classification
- Kingdom: Animalia
- Phylum: Arthropoda
- Clade: Pancrustacea
- Class: Insecta
- Order: Lepidoptera
- Family: Depressariidae
- Genus: Acraephnes
- Species: A. litodes

Binomial name
- Acraephnes litodes (Turner, 1947)

Synonyms
- Thudaca litodes Turner, 1947

Species of moth

Acraephnes litodes is a moth in the family Depressariidae. It was described by Alfred Jefferis Turner in 1947. It is found in Australia, where it has been recorded from Queensland.

The wingspan is 18–24 mm. The forewings are ochreous-whitish and the hindwings are white.
