= Thudaca trabeata =

Scientific classification
- Domain: Eukaryota
- Kingdom: Animalia
- Phylum: Arthropoda
- Class: Insecta
- Order: Lepidoptera
- Family: Oecophoridae
- Genus: Thudaca
- Species: T. trabeata

Binomial name
- Thudaca trabeata Meyrick, 1893

Species of moth

Thudaca trabeata is a moth in the family Depressariidae. It was described by Edward Meyrick in 1893. It is found in Australia, where it has been recorded from New South Wales, South Australia, Western Australia and Tasmania.

The wingspan is 15–18 mm. The forewings are deep golden ochreous with snow-white markings. There is a straight subcostal streak from the costa near the base to the costa again near the apex, as well as a straight median longitudinal streak from the base to the hindmargin beneath the apex. A streak is found along the inner margin from the base to the anal angle, attenuated near the base. The hindwings are light grey.
