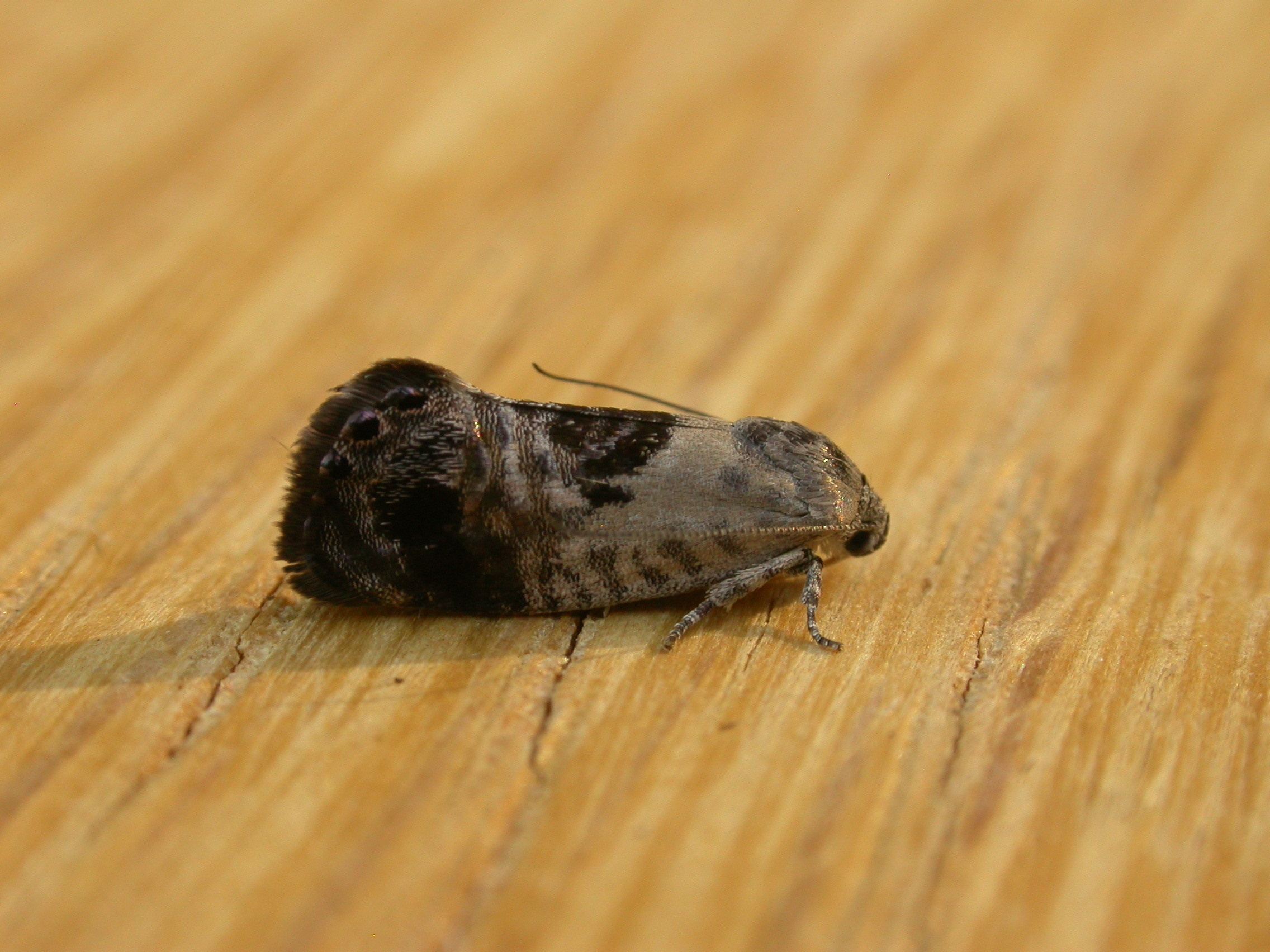

Scientific classification
- Kingdom: Animalia
- Phylum: Arthropoda
- Class: Insecta
- Order: Lepidoptera
- Family: Oecophoridae
- Genus: Eupselia
- Species: E. carpocapsella

Binomial name
- Eupselia carpocapsella (Walker, 1864)

Synonyms
- Orosana carpocapsella Walker, 1864

= Eupselia carpocapsella =

Species of moth

The common Eupselia moth, Eupselia carpocapsella, is a species of moth of the family Depressariidae. It is found in Australia, where it has been recorded from New South Wales and South Australia.

The larvae feed on the foliage of Eucalyptus species.
