= Hypertropha desumptana =

Scientific classification
- Kingdom: Animalia
- Phylum: Arthropoda
- Class: Insecta
- Order: Lepidoptera
- Family: Oecophoridae
- Genus: Hypertropha
- Species: H. desumptana

Binomial name
- Hypertropha desumptana (Walker, 1863)

Synonyms
- Orosana desumptana Walker, 1863

Species of moth

Hypertropha desumptana is a moth belonging to the family Depressariidae. First described by Francis Walker in 1863, it is found in Australia and has been recorded in Queensland.

Adults are cupreous black. The forewings are slightly acute, with a yellowish-cinereous coloration toward the base and scattered yellowish-cinereous speckles along the exterior. There are irregular transverse lines of metallic blue and purple, interrupted along their course, as well as an oblique costal subapical streak of yellowish-cinereous. The marginal line is a dark fawn color and is irregular. The hindwings are luteous, featuring a broad cupreous-black border.
