= Acraephnes inscripta =

Scientific classification
- Kingdom: Animalia
- Phylum: Arthropoda
- Clade: Pancrustacea
- Class: Insecta
- Order: Lepidoptera
- Family: Depressariidae
- Genus: Acraephnes
- Species: A. inscripta

Binomial name
- Acraephnes inscripta (Turner, 1947)

Synonyms
- Haereta inscripta Turner, 1947

Species of moth

Acraephnes inscripta is a moth in the family Depressariidae. It was described by Alfred Jefferis Turner in 1947. It is found in Australia, where it has been recorded from South Australia.
