= Hypertropha tortriciformis =

Scientific classification
- Kingdom: Animalia
- Phylum: Arthropoda
- Class: Insecta
- Order: Lepidoptera
- Family: Oecophoridae
- Genus: Hypertropha
- Species: H. tortriciformis

Binomial name
- Hypertropha tortriciformis (Boisduval & Guenée, 1852)

Synonyms
- Heliodes tortriciformis Boisduval & Guenée, 1852; Anthoecia divitiosa Walker, 1865

Species of moth

Hypertropha tortriciformis is a moth in the family Depressariidae. It was described by Jean Baptiste Boisduval and Achille Guenée in 1852. It is found in Australia, where it has been recorded from Tasmania, the Northern Territory, Queensland, New South Wales, Victoria, South Australia and Western Australia.

The wingspan is about 20 mm.
