= Eupselia philomorpha =

Scientific classification
- Domain: Eukaryota
- Kingdom: Animalia
- Phylum: Arthropoda
- Class: Insecta
- Order: Lepidoptera
- Family: Oecophoridae
- Genus: Eupselia
- Species: E. philomorpha

Binomial name
- Eupselia philomorpha Lower, 1902

Species of moth

Eupselia philomorpha is a moth in the family Depressariidae. It was described by Oswald Bertram Lower in 1902. It is found in Australia, where it has been recorded from Victoria.

The wingspan is about 16 mm. The forewings are dark purplish fuscous, with ochreous markings. There is a large somewhat cuneiform spot lying on the inner margin at the base, extending to beyond one-third, separated from the costa by a thick streak of ground colour. A large elongate-quadrate patch is found on the middle of the costa, extending more than half across the wing, the posterior edge faintly curved inwards. There is also a small subcostal spot before the apex and three roundish black spots on the lower two-thirds of the termen, the anterior edges yellowish, the posterior metallic purple. The hindwings are bright orange with some black scales along the base.
