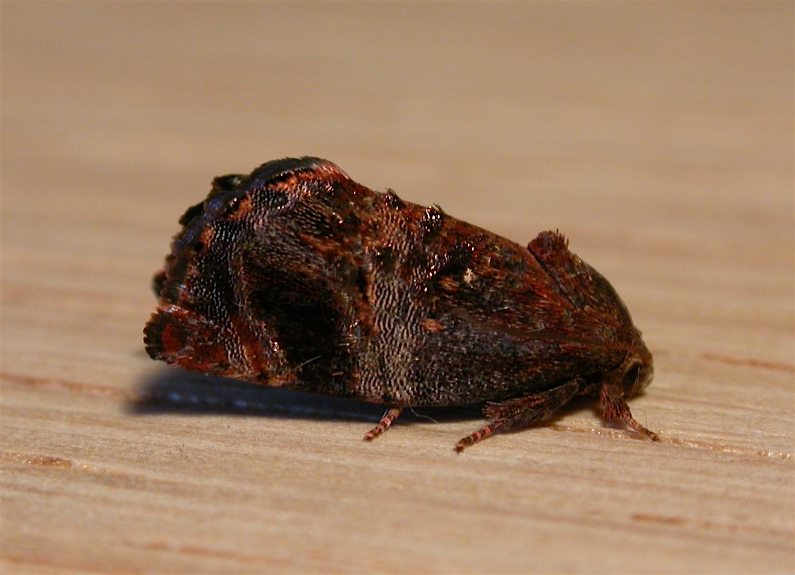

Scientific classification
- Kingdom: Animalia
- Phylum: Arthropoda
- Clade: Pancrustacea
- Class: Insecta
- Order: Lepidoptera
- Family: Depressariidae
- Subfamily: Hypertrophinae
- Genus: Peritropha; Diakonoff, 1954
- Species: P. oligodrachma

Binomial name
- Peritropha oligodrachma Diakonoff, 1954

= Peritropha =

Genus of moths

Peritropha oligodrachma is a species of moth of the family Depressariidae. It is the only species in the genus Peritropha. It is found in most of Australia.

The wingspan is about 20 mm.

The larvae live in a tunnel on the underside of a leaf of its food plant. It feeds on the leaves of various Eucalyptus species.
