= Eupselia tristephana =

Scientific classification
- Kingdom: Animalia
- Phylum: Arthropoda
- Class: Insecta
- Order: Lepidoptera
- Family: Oecophoridae
- Genus: Eupselia
- Species: E. tristephana

Binomial name
- Eupselia tristephana Meyrick, 1915

Species of moth

Eupselia tristephana is a moth in the family Depressariidae. It was described by Edward Meyrick in 1915. It is found in Australia, where it has been recorded from Western Australia, the Northern Territory and Queensland.

The wingspan is 12–13 mm. The forewings are dark bronzy fuscous with an erect triangular light ochreous-yellow blotch from the dorsum before the middle, its apex rather bent over posteriorly. There are three bright coppery-blue-purple transverse lines reaching from the dorsum three-fourths across the wing, the first immediately beyond the yellow blotch, the second connected with a light yellow spot on the costa beyond the middle, the third limiting an oval bronzy patch strewn with minute longitudinal blackish and rosy-whitish strigulae extending along the termen nearly to the costa. There is a narrow black streak along the lower half of the termen containing three small round black spots set in whitish-ochreous rings becoming golden metallic on the terminal edge. Two short oblique blue-purple marks are found before the apex. The hindwings are dark fuscous.
