= Thudaca crypsidesma =

Scientific classification
- Domain: Eukaryota
- Kingdom: Animalia
- Phylum: Arthropoda
- Class: Insecta
- Order: Lepidoptera
- Family: Oecophoridae
- Genus: Thudaca
- Species: T. crypsidesma

Binomial name
- Thudaca crypsidesma Meyrick, 1893

Species of moth

Thudaca crypsidesma is a moth in the family Depressariidae. It was described by Edward Meyrick in 1893. It is found in Australia, where it has been recorded from South Australia, Victoria, Tasmania and Western Australia.

The wingspan is 19–20 mm. The forewings are snow white with bright orange markings. The costal edge is blackish near the base and there is a moderate streak immediately beneath the costa from the base to the costa before the apex. A subdorsal streak, black edged above, is found from the base to the anal angle and there are two black-edged straight transverse streaks, the first from the subcostal streak at two-thirds to above the middle of the subdorsal but not nearly reaching it, suffusedly barred with blackish grey above the middle, the second from the extremity of the subcostal to the subdorsal before the extremity, suffused with blackish grey towards the costa and on a bar above the lower end. There is also a blackish line along the hindmargin. The hindwings are grey.

The larvae probably feed on Leptospermum species.
