= Hypertropha thesaurella =

Scientific classification
- Domain: Eukaryota
- Kingdom: Animalia
- Phylum: Arthropoda
- Class: Insecta
- Order: Lepidoptera
- Family: Oecophoridae
- Genus: Hypertropha
- Species: H. thesaurella

Binomial name
- Hypertropha thesaurella Meyrick, 1880

Species of moth

Hypertropha thesaurella is a moth in the family Depressariidae. It was described by Edward Meyrick in 1880. It is found in Australia, where it has been recorded from Queensland and New South Wales.

The wingspan is 19–20 mm. The forewings are black, the basal half almost entirely occupied by four transverse, rather outwardly curved, almost confluent faint ochreous-whitish bands, composed of numerous very fine transverse strigulae, these bands being very obscurely separated by slender black lines, only distinct as black spots on the costa, where also the pale bands are usually more distinct. There is a small ochreous-whitish spot on the costa in the middle, giving rise to an indistinct orange-ochreous transverse line marking off the basal half, and itself immediately followed by a metallic bluish-purple line of raised scales. Immediately preceding the ochreous line are three small metallic bluish-purple raised spots, one on the inner margin, one above and one below the middle. At about one-third from the base is a transverse metallic blue raised line from the middle of the disc perpendicularly to the inner margin, interrupted on the fold. There is an outwardly curved metallic blue-purple line from three-fourths of the costa to the anal angle, the lower half interrupted to form three spots near and parallel to the hind margin. The lower two-thirds of the space between this and the central line is strewn with ochreous-whitish scales, especially towards the inner margin. Beyond this line is a white outwardly oblique spot on the costa, emitting a faint band of transverse whitish strigulae along the hind margin to the anal angle, leaving three elongate black spots on the lower part of the hind margin. Beyond this band is an outwardly oblique orange-ochreous subapical spot from the costa. The hindwings are deep yellow, with a broad black margin.
