= Allotropha =

Scientific classification
- Kingdom: Animalia
- Phylum: Arthropoda
- Clade: Pancrustacea
- Class: Insecta
- Order: Lepidoptera
- Family: Depressariidae
- Subfamily: Hypertrophinae
- Genus: Allotropha; Diakonoff, 1954
- Species: A. percussana

Binomial name
- Allotropha percussana (Walker, 1864)

Synonyms
- Orosana percussana Walker, 1864

Genus of moths

Allotropha is a monotypic moth genus in the family Depressariidae described by Alexey Diakonoff in 1954. Its only species, Allotropha percussana, was described by Francis Walker in 1864. It is found in Australia, where it has been recorded from Tasmania.

Adults are cupreous blackish, the forewings slightly rounded at the tips with some transverse cinereous (ash-grey) lines, a few of which are chalybeous (steel blue) hindward. The disc near the exterior border has extremely minute longitudinal cinereous streaks. The marginal dots are deep black, partly chalybeous bordered. The exterior border is slightly convex, moderately oblique. The hindwings have a pale cinereous fringe.
