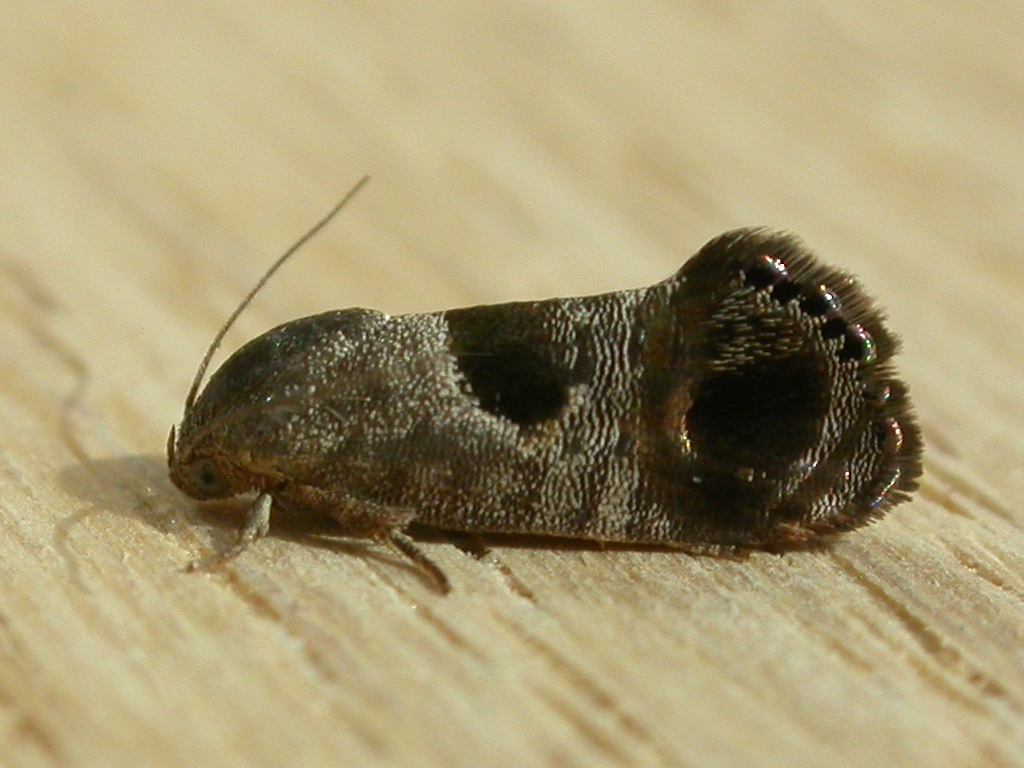

Scientific classification
- Kingdom: Animalia
- Phylum: Arthropoda
- Class: Insecta
- Order: Lepidoptera
- Family: Oecophoridae
- Genus: Eupselia
- Species: E. beatella

Binomial name
- Eupselia beatella (Walker, 1864)

Synonyms
- Orosana beatella Walker, 1864

= Eupselia beatella =

Species of moth

Eupselia beatella is a species of the family Depressariidae that occurs in Australia, where it has been recorded from Queensland, New South Wales and the Australian Capital Territory.
