= Thudaca calliphrontis =

Scientific classification
- Domain: Eukaryota
- Kingdom: Animalia
- Phylum: Arthropoda
- Class: Insecta
- Order: Lepidoptera
- Family: Oecophoridae
- Genus: Thudaca
- Species: T. calliphrontis

Binomial name
- Thudaca calliphrontis Meyrick, 1893

Species of moth

Thudaca calliphrontis is a moth in the family Depressariidae. It was described by Edward Meyrick in 1893. It is found in Australia, where it has been recorded from South Australia.

The wingspan is about 20 mm. The forewings are brownish ochreous, posteriorly irrorated with black between the veins and with the markings snow white. The costal edge is blackish near the base and there is a narrow suffusion along the middle third of the costa, as well as a moderate streak from the costa near the base beneath the costa to the costa again before the apex, posteriorly emitting two slender branches from the upper edge. A moderate irregular median longitudinal streak is found from the base to the hindmargin above the middle, constricted at one-third, the lower edge with triangular projections before and after the constriction, narrowly interrupted at three-fourths, bent upwards posteriorly, furcate at the apex. There is a cloudy streak of mixed white and blackish scales along the inner margin from the base to the anal angle. The hindwings are whitish grey.
