= Thudaca ophiosema =

Scientific classification
- Domain: Eukaryota
- Kingdom: Animalia
- Phylum: Arthropoda
- Class: Insecta
- Order: Lepidoptera
- Family: Oecophoridae
- Genus: Thudaca
- Species: T. ophiosema

Binomial name
- Thudaca ophiosema Meyrick, 1893

Species of moth

Thudaca ophiosema is a moth in the family Depressariidae. It was described by Edward Meyrick in 1893. It is found in Australia, where it has been recorded from Western Australia.

The wingspan is about 16 mm. The forewings are light ochreous brown, somewhat darker posteriorly. There is a white costal streak from near the base to four-fifths, interrupted by an inwardly oblique bar of ground colour about the middle. There is a white spot on the inner margin at one-third, preceded by a dark fuscous suffusion, and two small cloudy white spots on the inner margin at two-thirds. There is a moderate white median longitudinal streak from the base to four-fifths, sinuate upwards in the middle, and with the extremity bent upwards, partially margined with dark fuscous suffusion, which is continued posteriorly as a broad band to the hindmargin. There is a moderate irregular-edged white submarginal streak from the apex to the anal angle. The hindwings are ochreous whitish.
