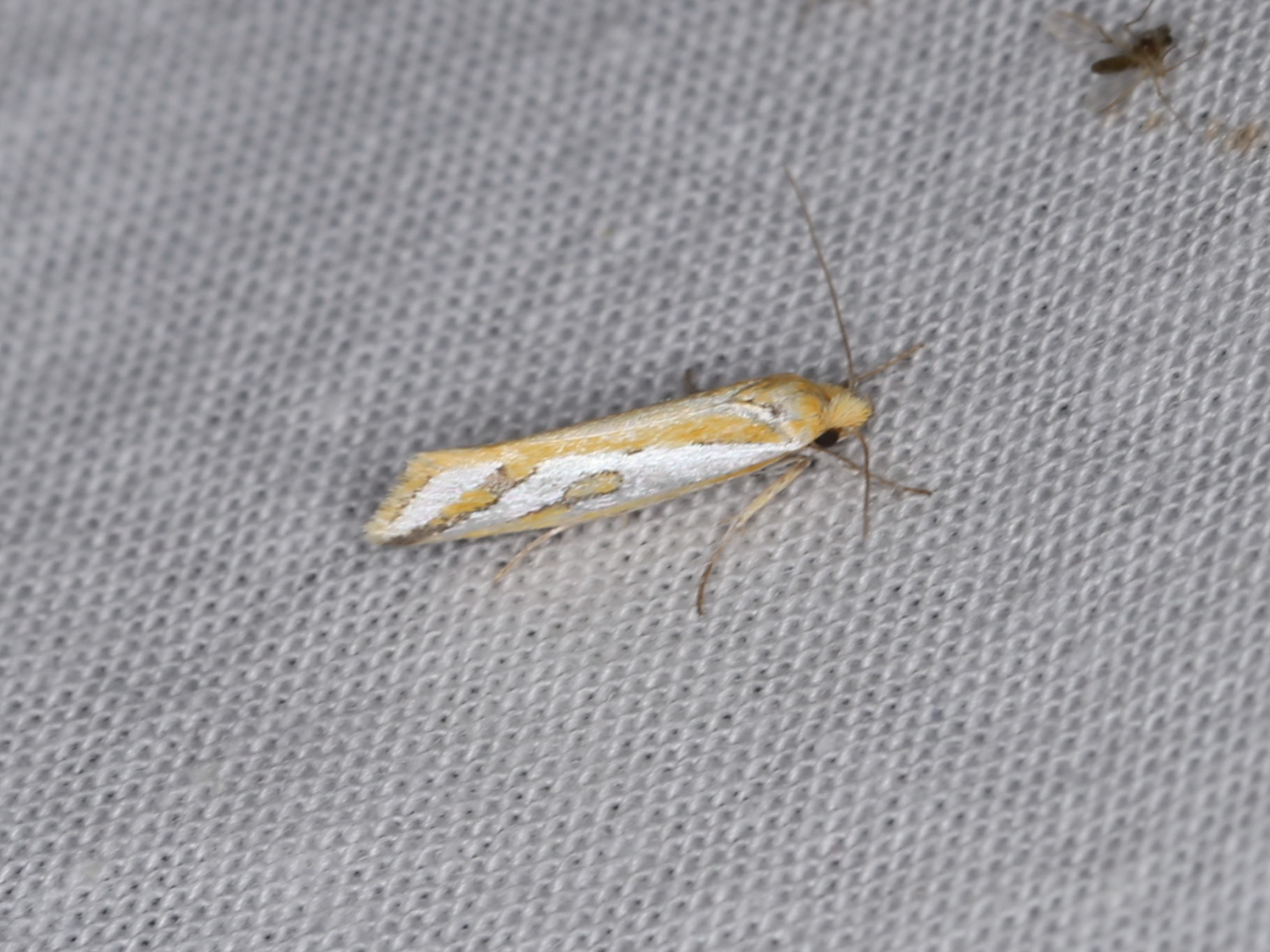

Scientific classification
- Domain: Eukaryota
- Kingdom: Animalia
- Phylum: Arthropoda
- Class: Insecta
- Order: Lepidoptera
- Family: Oecophoridae
- Genus: Thudaca
- Species: T. haplonota

Binomial name
- Thudaca haplonota Meyrick, 1893

= Thudaca haplonota =

Species of moth

Thudaca haplonota is a moth in the family Depressariidae. It was described by Edward Meyrick in 1893. It is found in Australia, where it has been recorded from Western Australia.

The wingspan is 19–20 mm. The forewings are silvery white with bright orange markings. The costal edge is blackish near the base and there is a moderate streak immediately beneath the costa from the base to the costa before the apex and a rather broad dorsal streak, partly black edged above, from the base to the anal angle, attenuated posteriorly, leaving the inner margin slenderly white near the base only. There are two straight partially black-edged transverse streaks, the first from the subcostal streak at three-fifths to above the middle of the subdorsal but not nearly reaching it, suffusedly barred with blackish grey above the middle, the second from the extremity of the subcostal to the subdorsal before the extremity, suffused with blackish grey towards the costa and on a bar above the lower end. There are also a few blackish scales on the hindmargin. The hindwings are light grey, faintly yellowish tinged.
