= Eupselia leucaspis =

Scientific classification
- Domain: Eukaryota
- Kingdom: Animalia
- Phylum: Arthropoda
- Class: Insecta
- Order: Lepidoptera
- Family: Oecophoridae
- Genus: Eupselia
- Species: E. leucaspis

Binomial name
- Eupselia leucaspis Meyrick, 1906

Species of moth

Eupselia leucaspis is a moth in the family Depressariidae. It was described by Edward Meyrick in 1906. It is found in Australia, where it has been recorded from South Australia and Western Australia.

The wingspan is 13–16 mm. The forewings are dark fuscous with an ochreous-white patch occupying the basal two-fifths except a costal streak. There is an ochreous-white fascia beyond the middle, on the lower half narrowed and bisected by a dark fuscous line or partially obscured with purplish. On each side of this fascia is an obscure deep purple line, becoming obsolete towards the costa. The terminal area is divided into two patches, very finely strigulated with whitish, the anterior longitudinally, the posterior transversely. There is a small whitish costal spot before the apex, from which a dark fuscous line runs obliquely to the termen beneath the apex. The hindwings are ochreous-yellow with an irregular dorsal fascia of dark fuscous suffusion and a variable dark fuscous terminal fascia, sometimes broad at the apex, sometimes very narrow, not reaching the tornus.
