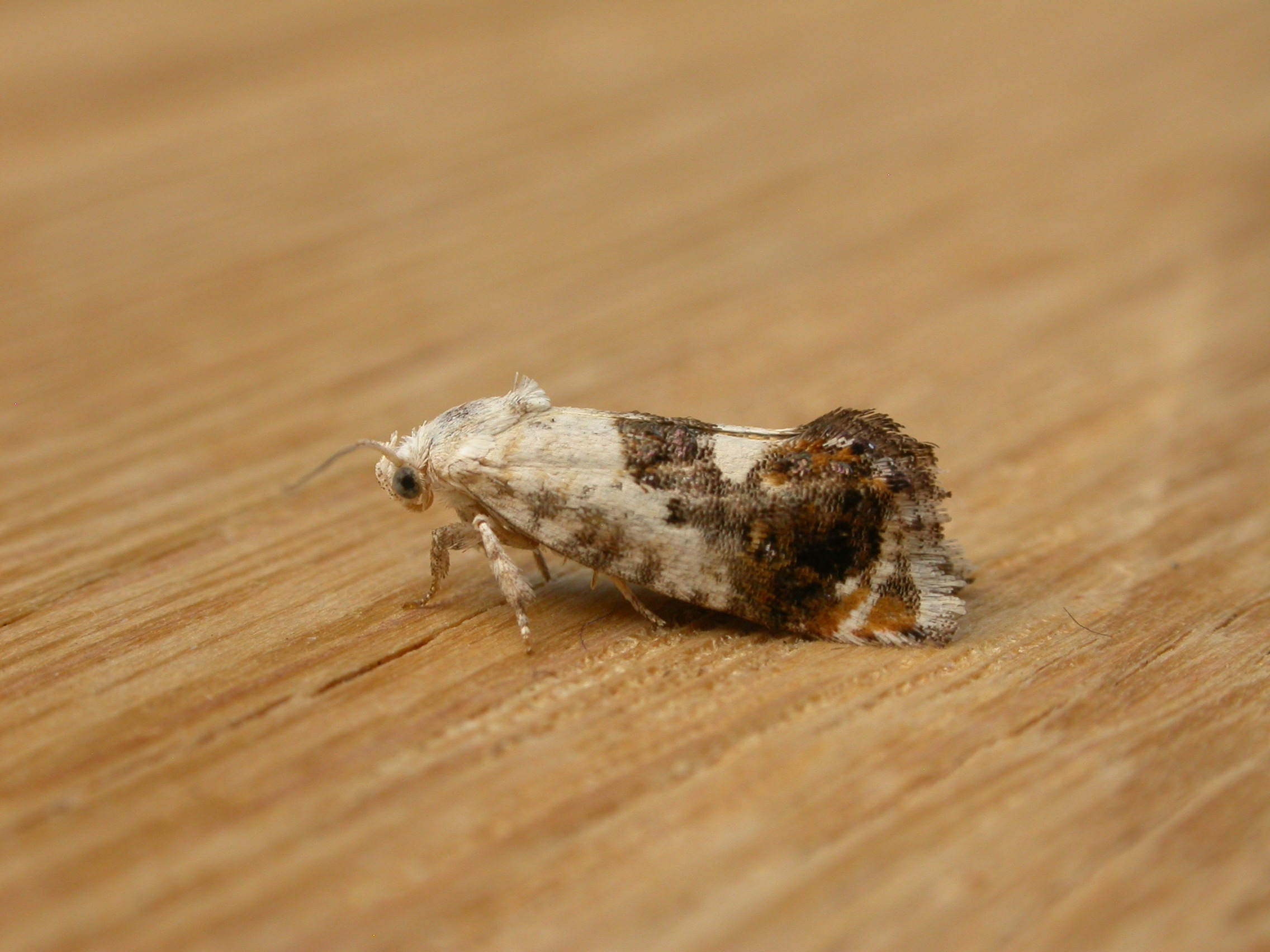

Scientific classification
- Kingdom: Animalia
- Phylum: Arthropoda
- Clade: Pancrustacea
- Class: Insecta
- Order: Lepidoptera
- Family: Depressariidae
- Subfamily: Hypertrophinae
- Genus: Progonica; Turner, 1947
- Species: P. rhothias

Binomial name
- Progonica rhothias (Meyrick, 1906)

= Progonica =

Genus of moths

Progonica rhothias is a species of moth in the family Depressariidae. It is the only species in the genus Progonica. It is found in Australia.
