= Oxytropha =

Scientific classification
- Kingdom: Animalia
- Phylum: Arthropoda
- Class: Insecta
- Order: Lepidoptera
- Family: Oecophoridae
- Subfamily: Hypertrophinae
- Genus: Oxytropha; Diakonoff, 1954
- Species: O. ametalla

Binomial name
- Oxytropha ametalla (Turner, 1898)

Synonyms
- Hypertropha ametalla Turner, 1898; Hypertropha zophodesma Meyrick, 1906

Species of moth

Oxytropha ametalla is a moth in the family Depressariidae, and the only species in the genus Oxytropha. It was described by Alfred Jefferis Turner in 1898 and is found in Australia, where it has been recorded from Victoria and New South Wales.

The wingspan is about 17 mm. The forewings are fuscous, irrorated with whitish, reddish-fuscous, and blackish scales and with an obscure outwardly curved transverse blackish line from the costa at one-third, not reaching the inner-margin. There are indications of two fainter similar lines between this and the base, and of five very faint parallel lines from the costa beyond one-third, all lost in the disc. There is an ill-defined blackish spot in the costal portion of the disc beyond the middle. The hindwings are pale-yellow, with a broad fuscous line along the hind and inner-margins.
