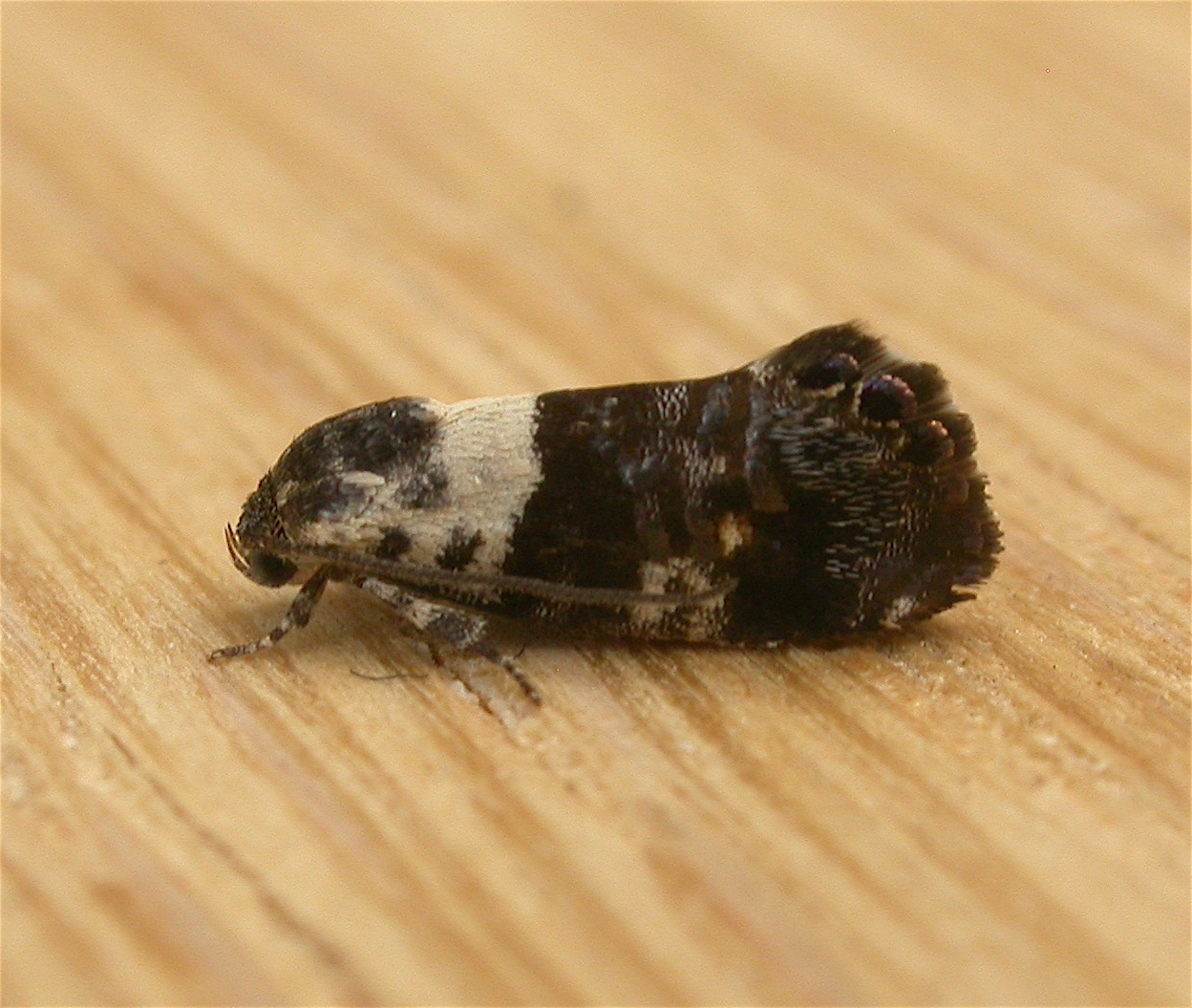

Scientific classification
- Domain: Eukaryota
- Kingdom: Animalia
- Phylum: Arthropoda
- Class: Insecta
- Order: Lepidoptera
- Family: Oecophoridae
- Genus: Eupselia
- Species: E. aristonica

Binomial name
- Eupselia aristonica Meyrick, 1880

= Eupselia aristonica =

Species of moth

Eupselia aristonica is a species of moth belonging to the family Depressariidae. It is found in Australia, where it has been recorded from New South Wales, the Australian Capital Territory, Victoria and Tasmania.

The wingspan measures approximately 15 mm. The forewings are very dark fuscous, almost black, with a square white spot on the inner-margin near the base. Anteriorly somewhat suffused, the upper anterior angle is connected by two short suffused white streaks: one running to the center of the base and the other to the costa near the base. This area is followed by a few scattered whitish scales. A small rectangular white spot is located in the middle of the costa, divided into two parts by a transverse dark fuscous line. Each half gives rise to a leaden-blue metallic line that proceeds parallel directly across the wing. A leaden-blue metallic spot is present before them on the inner-margin. Additionally, a leaden-blue metallic line extends from the middle of the disc immediately beyond them to the anal angle, though it is interrupted beneath its apex. Beyond this line, there are densely scattered very fine longitudinal whitish hair-scales. Additionally, there is a very small white spot on the costa before the apex, which gives rise to a short outwardly oblique leaden-metallic line. A small leaden-metallic spot is located beneath this line. The extreme apex is ochreous-orange. There are four circular black spots on the lower half of the hind-margin, surrounded by a few pale ochreous scales. The uppermost spot is small. A violet-metallic line is present along the hind-margin at the base of the cilia. The rest of the cilia are dark fuscous. The hindwings are blackish-fuscous in color.

The larvae are believed to feed on the foliage of Eucalyptus species.
