= Thudaca campylota =

Scientific classification
- Domain: Eukaryota
- Kingdom: Animalia
- Phylum: Arthropoda
- Class: Insecta
- Order: Lepidoptera
- Family: Oecophoridae
- Genus: Thudaca
- Species: T. campylota

Binomial name
- Thudaca campylota Meyrick, 1893

Species of moth

Thudaca campylota is a moth in the family Depressariidae. It was described by Edward Meyrick in 1893. It is found in Australia, where it has been recorded from Western Australia.

The wingspan is 17–18 mm. The forewings are snow white with bright orange markings, partially blackish edged. The costal edge is blackish towards the base and there is a moderate streak immediately beneath the costa from the base to the costa before the apex. A subdorsal somewhat irregular streak is found from the base almost to the anal angle and there is a transverse streak from two-thirds of the subcostal streak to the middle of the subdorsal, forming an obtuse-angled zigzag in the middle. There is also a straight rather irregular-edged streak from the extremity of the subcostal to the extremity of the subdorsal streak. Some blackish scales are found on the hindmargin. The hindwings are light grey.
