= Eupselia anommata =

Scientific classification
- Kingdom: Animalia
- Phylum: Arthropoda
- Clade: Pancrustacea
- Class: Insecta
- Order: Lepidoptera
- Family: Depressariidae
- Genus: Eupselia
- Species: E. anommata

Binomial name
- Eupselia anommata Turner, 1898

Synonyms
- Eupselia trithrona Meyrick, 1906

Species of moth

Eupselia anommata is a moth in the family Depressariidae. It was described by Alfred Jefferis Turner in 1898. It is found in Australia, where it has been recorded from New South Wales.

The wingspan is about 14 mm. The forewings are purple fuscous, with a violet metallic lustre and a whitish blotch on the inner margin from one-fifth to three-fifths, not quite reaching the costa, as well as a narrow whitish fascia from the costa at two-thirds, two before the anal angle, constricted in the disc. The hindwings are fuscous, ochreous tinged, especially towards the base.
