= Thudaca stadiaula =

Scientific classification
- Domain: Eukaryota
- Kingdom: Animalia
- Phylum: Arthropoda
- Class: Insecta
- Order: Lepidoptera
- Family: Oecophoridae
- Genus: Thudaca
- Species: T. stadiaula

Binomial name
- Thudaca stadiaula Meyrick, 1893

Species of moth

Thudaca stadiaula is a moth in the family Depressariidae. It was described by Edward Meyrick in 1893. It is found in Australia, where it has been recorded from Western Australia.

The wingspan is about 15 mm. The forewings are deep coppery-golden ochreous with silvery-white markings. There is a streak along the costa from near the base to near the apex, becoming subcostal for a short distance in the middle. A straight median longitudinal streak is found from the base to five-sixths, the apex truncate. There is also a streak along the inner margin from near the base to the anal angle and an elongate spot extending along the upper two-thirds of the hindmargin. The hindwings are pale whitish-ochreous grey.
