= Eupselia melanostrepta =

Scientific classification
- Kingdom: Animalia
- Phylum: Arthropoda
- Class: Insecta
- Order: Lepidoptera
- Family: Oecophoridae
- Genus: Eupselia
- Species: E. melanostrepta

Binomial name
- Eupselia melanostrepta Meyrick, 1880

Species of moth

Eupselia melanostrepta is a moth in the family Depressariidae. It was described by Edward Meyrick in 1880, where it has been recorded from Victoria and Tasmania.

The wingspan is about 15 mm. The forewings are brownish ochreous, so densely irrorated with ochreous-whitish scales that the ground colour is entirely obscured, except on a few faint transverse streaks. There are two more distinct transverse ochreous-brown streaks in the middle from the costa to the inner margin, divergent above the middle, approximated on the inner margin, where they enclose a small white spot. Before these the inner margin is obscurely whitish nearly to the base and there is an oblique ochreous-brown streak from three-fourths of the costa to the hind margin below the apex, and an indistinct ochreous-brown oblique streak immediately before the apex. The surface of the wing is strewn with ochreous-whitish hair-scales towards the lower part of the hind margin and there are six round black spots very close together on the hind margin below the middle, as well as a violet-metallic line on the base of the cilia, broken into roundish spots, especially towards the apex. The rest of the cilia is smoky fuscous. The hindwings and cilia are dark fuscous.
