= Acraephnes nivea =

Scientific classification
- Kingdom: Animalia
- Phylum: Arthropoda
- Clade: Pancrustacea
- Class: Insecta
- Order: Lepidoptera
- Family: Depressariidae
- Genus: Acraephnes
- Species: A. nivea

Binomial name
- Acraephnes nivea Turner, 1947

Species of moth

Acraephnes nivea is a moth in the family Depressariidae. It was described by Alfred Jefferis Turner in 1947. It is found in Australia, where it has been recorded from Queensland and New South Wales.

The wingspan is 16–22 mm. The forewings and hindwings are white.
