= Thudaca cymatistis =

Scientific classification
- Kingdom: Animalia
- Phylum: Arthropoda
- Class: Insecta
- Order: Lepidoptera
- Family: Oecophoridae
- Genus: Thudaca
- Species: T. cymatistis

Binomial name
- Thudaca cymatistis Meyrick, 1893

Species of moth

Thudaca cymatistis is a moth in the family Depressariidae. It was described by Edward Meyrick in 1893. It is found in Australia, where it has been recorded from Western Australia.

The wingspan is 14–16 mm. The forewings are ochreous brown, lighter towards the base and costa and with the markings snow white. There is a streak along the costa from near the base to the middle and an elongate blotch along the costa from beyond the middle to four-fifths, as well as an irregular median longitudinal streak from the base to three-fourths, the lower margin forming quadrate projections at the base, the middle, and the apex. There is also a white spot on the inner margin at one-third and another at two-thirds, as well as an irregular submarginal streak from the apex to the anal angle. The hindwings are whitish grey.
