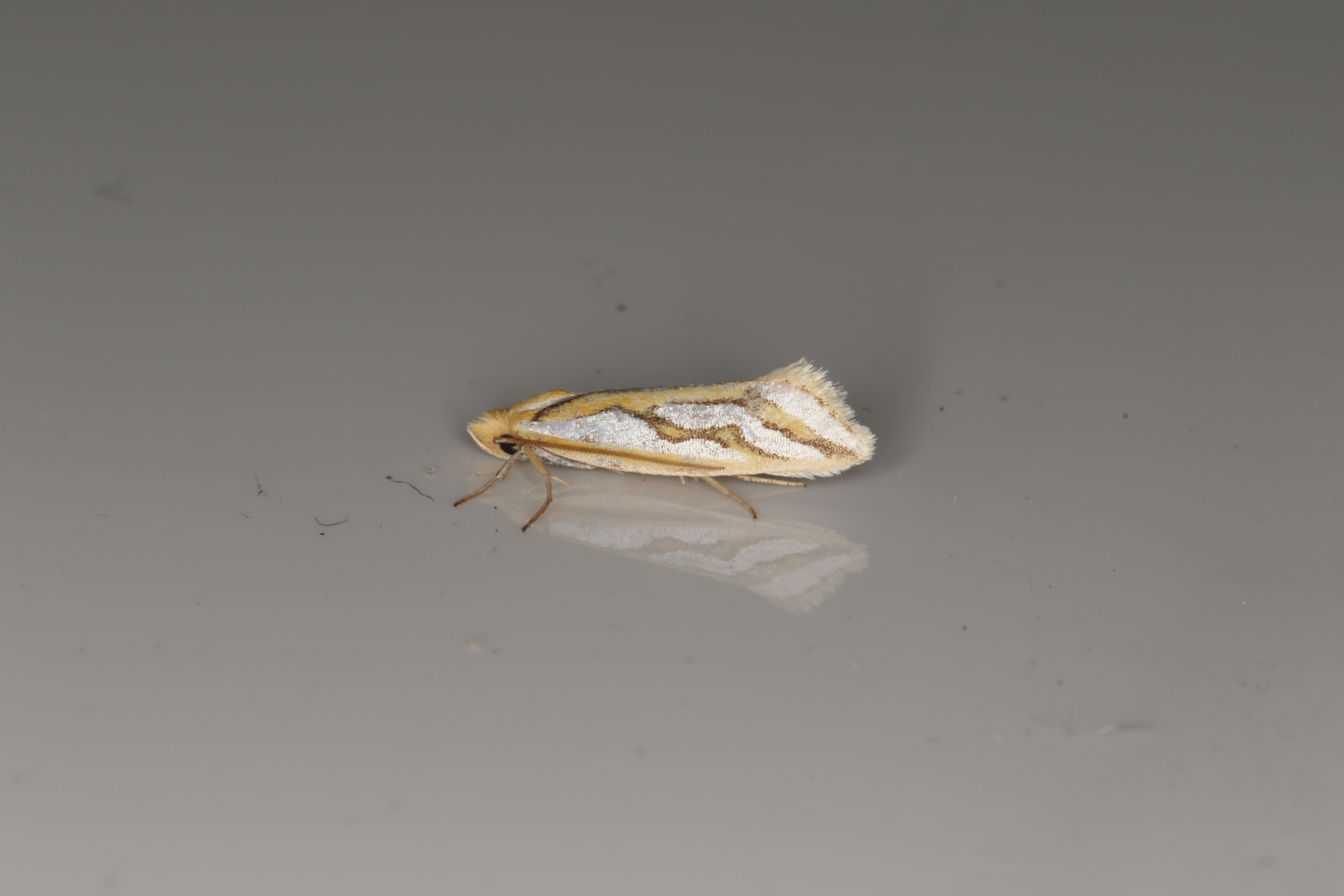

Scientific classification
- Domain: Eukaryota
- Kingdom: Animalia
- Phylum: Arthropoda
- Class: Insecta
- Order: Lepidoptera
- Family: Oecophoridae
- Genus: Thudaca
- Species: T. heterastis

Binomial name
- Thudaca heterastis Meyrick, 1893

= Thudaca heterastis =

Species of moth

Thudaca heterastis is a moth in the family Depressariidae. It was described by Edward Meyrick in 1893. It is found in Australia, where it has been recorded from Western Australia.

The wingspan is 16–20 mm. The forewings are snow white with a moderate orange streak immediately beneath the costa from the base to the costa near the apex, sometimes obsolete beyond two-thirds. There is a rather broad orange streak along the inner margin to the anal angle, becoming suddenly subdorsal on the basal fourth and not quite reaching the base, usually more or less wholly suffused with dark fuscous, posteriorly attenuated. There is a transverse orange streak suffused with dark fuscous, from the subcostal streak at three-fifths to the middle of the dorsal streak, forming an obtuse-angled zigzag in the middle, sometimes interrupted or wholly absent. A straight orange streak, suffused with dark fuscous, is found from the costa near the apex to the anal angle, sometimes widely interrupted or visible at the extremities only. There are some dark fuscous scales on the hindmargin. The hindwings are pale whitish grey, faintly yellowish tinged.
