= Acraephnes cryeropis =

Scientific classification
- Kingdom: Animalia
- Phylum: Arthropoda
- Clade: Pancrustacea
- Class: Insecta
- Order: Lepidoptera
- Family: Depressariidae
- Genus: Acraephnes
- Species: A. cryeropis

Binomial name
- Acraephnes cryeropis (Turner, 1947)

Synonyms
- Thudaca cryeropis Turner, 1947

Species of moth

Acraephnes cryeropis is a moth in the family Depressariidae. It was described by Alfred Jefferis Turner in 1947. It is found in Australia, where it has been recorded from New South Wales.

The wingspan is 22 mm. The forewings are shining white and the hindwings are white.
