= Thudaca orthodroma =

Scientific classification
- Domain: Eukaryota
- Kingdom: Animalia
- Phylum: Arthropoda
- Class: Insecta
- Order: Lepidoptera
- Family: Oecophoridae
- Genus: Thudaca
- Species: T. orthodroma

Binomial name
- Thudaca orthodroma Meyrick, 1893

Species of moth

Thudaca orthodroma is a moth in the family Depressariidae. It was described by Edward Meyrick in 1893. It is found in Australia, where it has been recorded from Western Australia.

The wingspan is 13–14 mm. The forewings are golden-ochreous brown with snow-white markings. There is a streak along the costa from one-fifth to before the middle and a subcostal streak from before the middle to the costa at three-fourths, as well as a median longitudinal streak from the base to three-fourths, the lower edge emarginate in the middle, the apex bent upwards. There is also a streak along the inner margin from one-fourth to near the anal angle and an elongate blotch along the upper two-thirds of the hindmargin, and a small spot on the anal angle. The hindwings are light grey.
