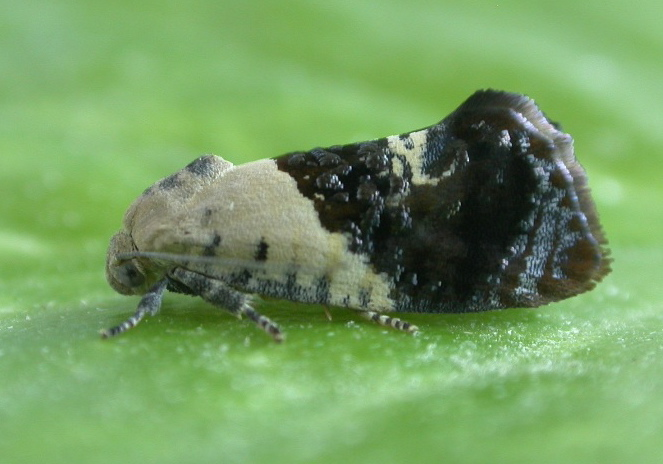

Scientific classification
- Kingdom: Animalia
- Phylum: Arthropoda
- Class: Insecta
- Order: Lepidoptera
- Family: Oecophoridae
- Genus: Hypertropha
- Species: H. chlaenota

Binomial name
- Hypertropha chlaenota Meyrick, 1887

= Hypertropha chlaenota =

Species of moth

Hypertropha chlaenota is a species of moth of the family Depressariidae first described by Edward Meyrick in 1887. It is found in Australia, where it has been recorded from Victoria, Queensland, New South Wales, the Australian Capital Territory and South Australia.

The wingspan is 20–23 mm. The forewings are rather dark shining fuscous, with coppery reflections and with a large whitish-ochreous basal patch, extending on the costa to the middle, on the inner margin to two-fifths, its outer edge nearly straight, on the costa marked with four direct cloudy blackish strigulae. There is a small whitish-ochreous irregularly triangular spot on the inner margin before the anal angle, containing a dot of ground colour. The space between this and the basal patch is thickly strewn with small bluish-leaden metallic spots, and there is a curved broken dentate whitish-ochreous line from four-fifths of the costa to the anal angle, preceded by an irregular series of bluish-leaden metallic spots, before which is a blackish suffusion in the disc. The hindwings are ochreous yellow, with a moderate dark fuscous hindmarginal border.

The larvae feed on Angophora and Eucalyptus species.

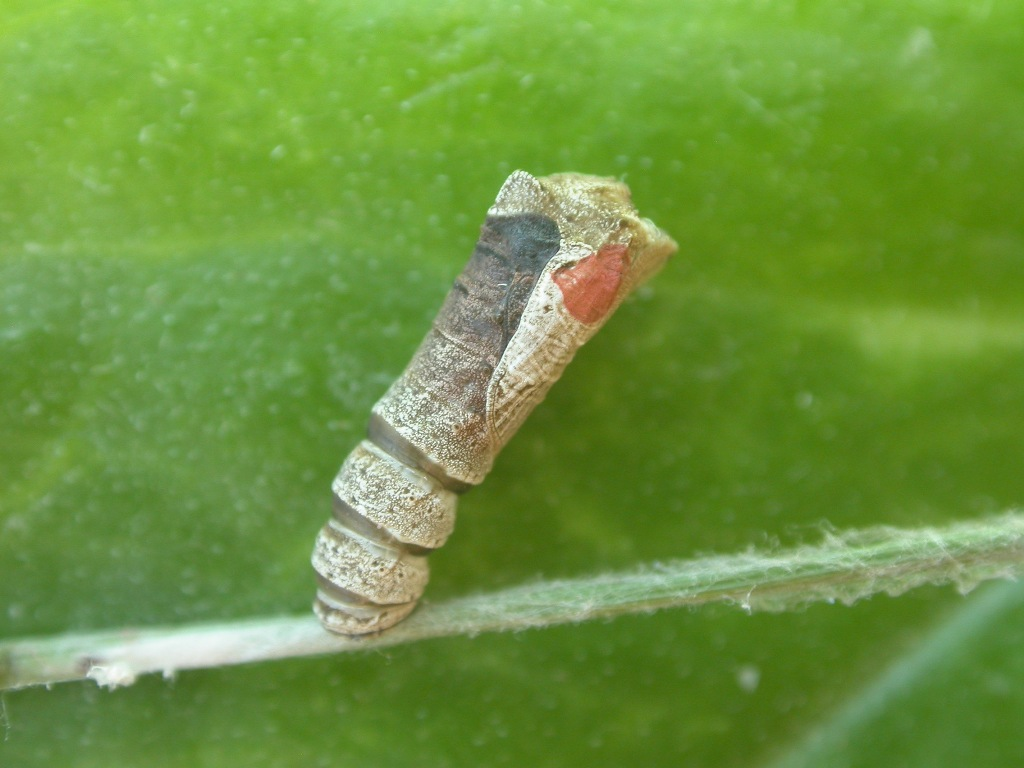
Pupa
