= Eupselia hypsichora =

Scientific classification
- Kingdom: Animalia
- Phylum: Arthropoda
- Class: Insecta
- Order: Lepidoptera
- Family: Oecophoridae
- Genus: Eupselia
- Species: E. hypsichora

Binomial name
- Eupselia hypsichora Meyrick, 1906

Species of moth

Eupselia hypsichora is a moth in the family Depressariidae. It was described by Edward Meyrick in 1906. It is found in Australia, where it has been recorded from Western Australia.

The wingspan is 12–13 mm. The forewings are dark fuscous, slightly purplish tinged and with a broad ochreous-yellow fascia from the middle of the costa, where it includes a dark fuscous dot, to the dorsum, where it extends from one-third to near the tornus, narrowed upwards, the edges slightly curved inwards. The hindwings are dark fuscous, the basal half sometimes more or less wholly suffused with ochreous yellow.
