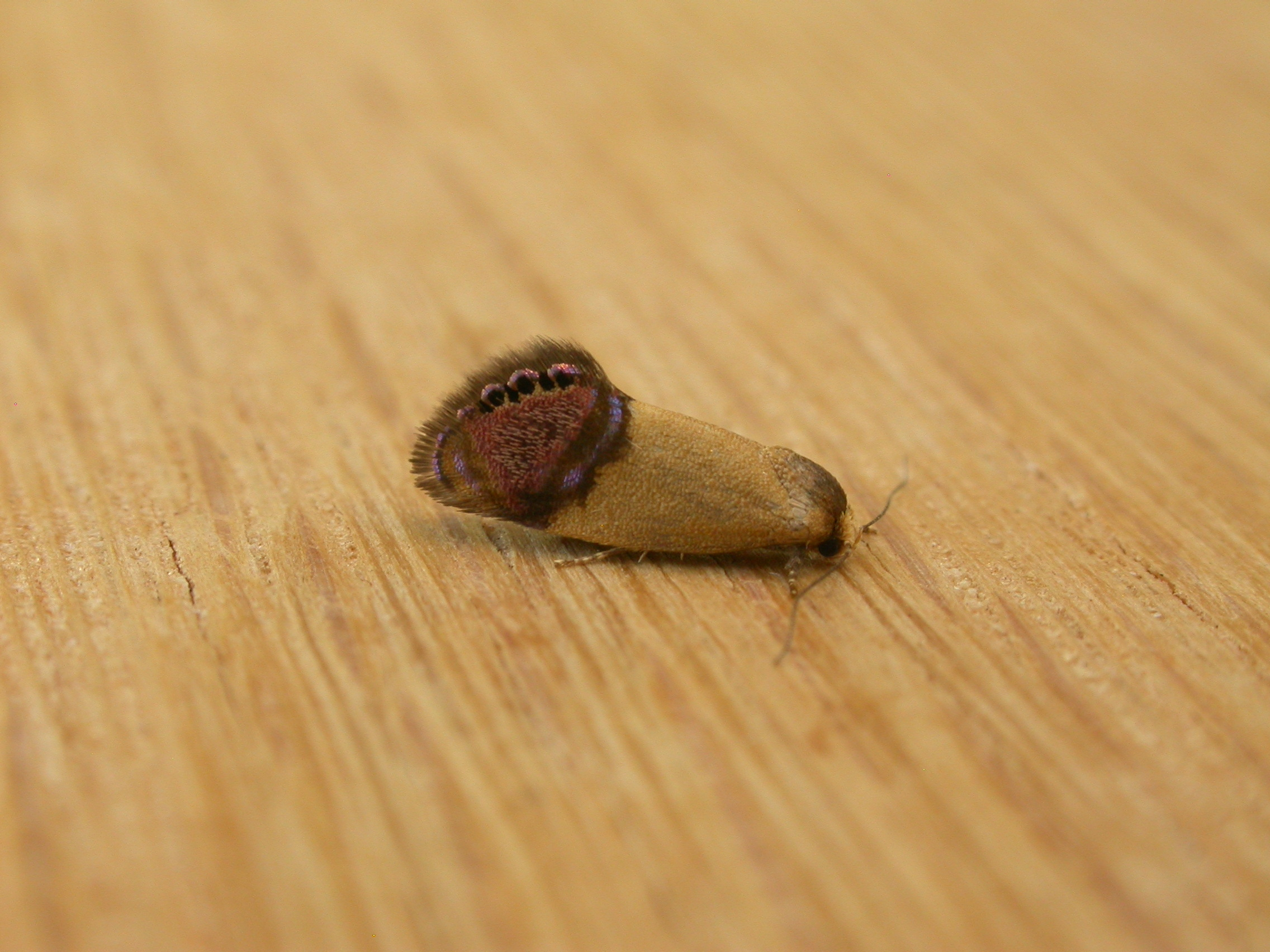

Scientific classification
- Domain: Eukaryota
- Kingdom: Animalia
- Phylum: Arthropoda
- Class: Insecta
- Order: Lepidoptera
- Family: Oecophoridae
- Genus: Eupselia
- Species: E. satrapella

Binomial name
- Eupselia satrapella Meyrick, 1880

= Eupselia satrapella =

Species of moth

Eupselia satrapella is a species of moth of the family Depressariidae. It is found in Australia, where it has been recorded from Queensland, New South Wales and the Australian Capital Territory.

The wingspan is 16.5–19 mm. The forewings are deep yellow, with the apical portion beyond an inwardly curved line from three-fifths of the costa to three-fourths of the inner-margin purple (light reddish-purple scales being thickly strewn on a black ground, towards the anal angle in longitudinal lines). There is a suffused dark fuscous streak along the costa from the base to the middle and a dark fuscous streak along the lower half of the division-line of the yellow and purple portions, immediately beyond which are two small deep blue spots, one in the middle, the other above the inner-margin. There is a broader dark fuscous streak from the costa at the junction of yellow and purple portions to the anal angle, slightly curved inwards, bordered posteriorly on its lower half with purple-blue. A very oblique, short, dark fuscous streak runs from the costal extremity of this streak towards the hind-margin a little below the apex, above which is a deep purple-blue spot, and the extreme the costa is yellow. There are four round black spots on the lower part of the hind-margin, surrounded by ochreous scales, and alternating with three smaller longitudinally elongate black spots. There is also a metallic purple line along the base of the cilia, the rest of the cilia dark fuscous. The hindwings are dark fuscous.
