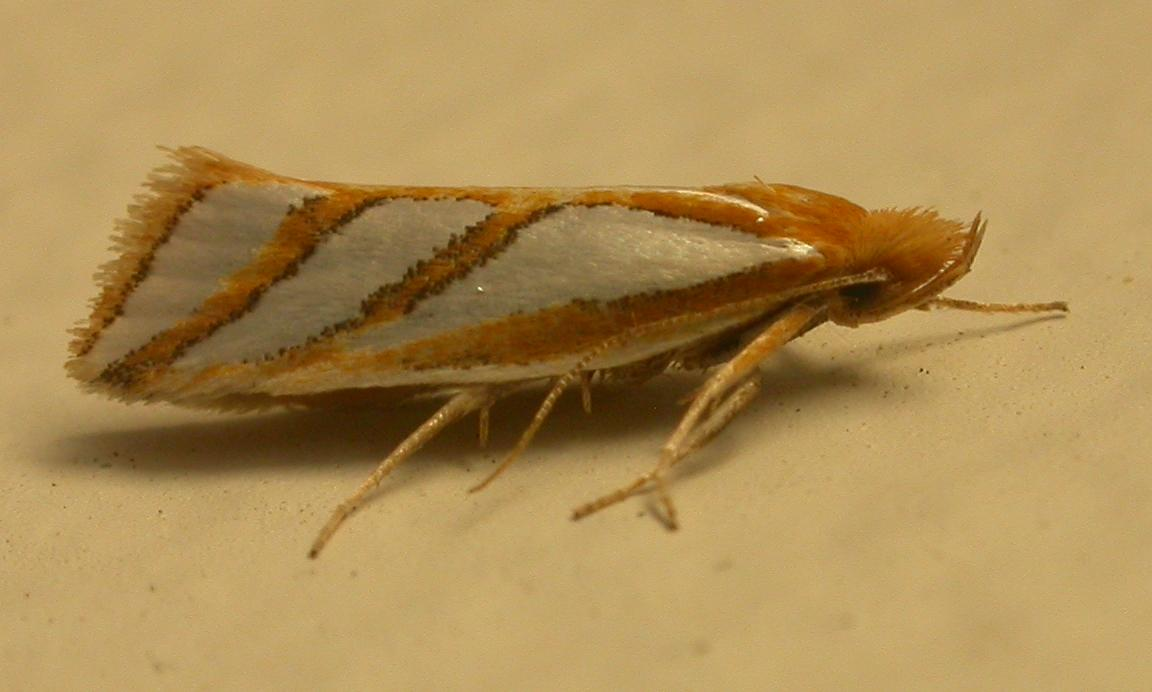

Scientific classification
- Domain: Eukaryota
- Kingdom: Animalia
- Phylum: Arthropoda
- Class: Insecta
- Order: Lepidoptera
- Family: Oecophoridae
- Genus: Thudaca
- Species: T. mimodora

Binomial name
- Thudaca mimodora Meyrick, 1892

= Thudaca mimodora =

Species of moth

Thudaca mimodora is a moth of the family Depressariidae. It is found in Australia, where it has been recorded from New South Wales, Queensland, the Australian Capital Territory and Victoria.
