= List of moths of the Iberian Peninsula (A–F) =

Location of the Iberian Peninsula

There are about 4,454 species of moth in the Iberian Peninsula. The moths (mostly nocturnal) and butterflies (mostly diurnal) together make up the taxonomic order Lepidoptera.

This is a list of moth species which have been recorded in Portugal, Spain and Gibraltar (together forming the Iberian Peninsula). This list also includes species found on the Balearic Islands.

== Adelidae ==
- Adela australis (Heydenreich, 1851)
- Adela collicolella Walsingham, 1904
- Adela croesella (Scopoli, 1763)
- Adela cuprella (Denis & Schiffermüller, 1775)
- Adela homalella Staudinger, 1859
- Adela mazzolella (Hübner, 1801)
- Adela pantherellus (Guenée, 1848)
- Adela reaumurella (Linnaeus, 1758)
- Adela violella (Denis & Schiffermüller, 1775)
- Cauchas fibulella (Denis & Schiffermüller, 1775)
- Cauchas rufimitrella (Scopoli, 1763)
- Nematopogon adansoniella (Villers, 1789)
- Nematopogon metaxella (Hübner, 1813)
- Nematopogon robertella (Clerck, 1759)
- Nematopogon schwarziellus Zeller, 1839
- Nemophora albiciliellus (Staudinger, 1859)
- Nemophora barbatellus (Zeller, 1847)
- Nemophora cupriacella (Hübner, 1819)
- Nemophora degeerella (Linnaeus, 1758)
- Nemophora dumerilella (Duponchel, 1839)
- Nemophora fasciella (Fabricius, 1775)
- Nemophora istrianellus (Heydenreich, 1851)
- Nemophora metallica (Poda, 1761)
- Nemophora minimella (Denis & Schiffermüller, 1775)
- Nemophora prodigellus (Zeller, 1853)
- Nemophora raddaella (Hübner, 1793)
- Nemophora violellus (Herrich-Schäffer in Stainton, 1851)

== Alucitidae ==
- Alucita cancellata (Meyrick, 1908)
- Alucita cymatodactyla Zeller, 1852
- Alucita debilella Scholz & Jackh, 1994
- Alucita desmodactyla Zeller, 1847
- Alucita grammodactyla Zeller, 1841
- Alucita hexadactyla Linnaeus, 1758
- Alucita huebneri Wallengren, 1859
- Alucita iberica Scholz & Jackh, 1994
- Alucita palodactyla Zeller, 1847
- Alucita zonodactyla Zeller, 1847

== Argyresthiidae ==
- Argyresthia albistria (Haworth, 1828)
- Argyresthia bonnetella (Linnaeus, 1758)
- Argyresthia brockeella (Hübner, 1813)
- Argyresthia conjugella Zeller, 1839
- Argyresthia glaucinella Zeller, 1839
- Argyresthia goedartella (Linnaeus, 1758)
- Argyresthia pruniella (Clerck, 1759)
- Argyresthia pygmaeella (Denis & Schiffermüller, 1775)
- Argyresthia retinella Zeller, 1839
- Argyresthia semifusca (Haworth, 1828)
- Argyresthia spinosella Stainton, 1849
- Argyresthia arceuthina Zeller, 1839
- Argyresthia illuminatella Zeller, 1839
- Argyresthia perezi Vives, 2001
- Argyresthia praecocella Zeller, 1839
- Argyresthia trifasciata Staudinger, 1871

== Autostichidae ==
- Apatema baixerasi Vives, 2001
- Apatema mediopallidum Walsingham, 1900
- Apatema parodia (Gozmány, 1988)
- Apateona hispanicum Gozmány, 1985
- Aprominta cryptogamarum (Milliere, 1872)
- Arragonia kautzi (Rebel, 1928)
- Arragonia punctivitella (Zerny, 1927)
- Catasphalma kautziella (Rebel, 1935)
- Donaspastus digitatus Gozmány, 1985
- Dysspastus fallax (Gozmány, 1961)
- Heringita heringi Agenjo, 1953
- Hesperesta alicantella Derra, 2008
- Hesperesta geminella (Chrétien, 1915)
- Holcopogon bubulcellus (Staudinger, 1859)
- Holcopogon glaserorum Gozmány, 1985
- Metaxitagma connivens Gozmány, 1985
- Metaxitagma monotona Gozmány, 2008
- Oegoconia caradjai Popescu-Gorj & Capuse, 1965
- Oegoconia deauratella (Herrich-Schäffer, 1854)
- Oegoconia huemeri Sutter, 2007
- Oegoconia novimundi (Busck, 1915)
- Oegoconia quadripuncta (Haworth, 1828)
- Orpecacantha burmanni (Gozmány, 1962)
- Orpecovalva diadema Gozmány, 1977
- Orpecovalva glaseri Gozmány, 1977
- Orpecovalva mallorcae Gozmány, 1975
- Stibaromacha ratella (Herrich-Schäffer, 1854)
- Symmoca alhambrella Walsingham, 1911
- Symmoca degregorioi Requena, 2007
- Symmoca dodecatella Staudinger, 1859
- Symmoca hendrikseni Gozmány, 1996
- Symmoca mimetica Gozmány, 2008
- Symmoca nigromaculella Ragonot, 1875
- Symmoca oenophila Staudinger, 1871
- Symmoca orphnella Rebel, 1893
- Symmoca perobscurata Gozmány, 1957
- Symmoca petrogenes Walsingham, 1907
- Symmoca ponerias Walsingham, 1905
- Symmoca pyrenaica Gozmány, 1985
- Symmoca revoluta Gozmány, 1985
- Symmoca sattleri Gozmány, 1962
- Symmoca senora Gozmány, 1977
- Symmoca serrata Gozmány, 1985
- Symmoca signatella Herrich-Schäffer, 1854
- Symmoca signella (Hübner, 1796)
- Symmoca simulans Gozmány, 1985
- Symmoca sorrisa Gozmány, 1975
- Symmoca suffumata Gozmány, 1996
- Symmoca sultan Gozmány, 1962
- Symmoca tofosella Rebel, 1893
- Symmoca uniformella Rebel, 1900
- Symmocoides don (Gozmány, 1963)
- Symmocoides ferreirae Gozmány, 2000
- Symmocoides gozmanyi (Amsel, 1959)
- Symmocoides marthae (Gozmány, 1957)
- Symmocoides oxybiella (Milliere, 1872)

== Batrachedridae ==
- Batrachedra parvulipunctella Chrétien, 1915
- Batrachedra pinicolella (Zeller, 1839)
- Batrachedra praeangusta (Haworth, 1828)

== Bedelliidae ==
- Bedellia ehikella Szocs, 1967
- Bedellia somnulentella (Zeller, 1847)

== Blastobasidae ==
- Blastobasis decolorella (Wollaston, 1858)
- Blastobasis lavernella Walsingham, 1894
- Blastobasis magna Amsel, 1952
- Blastobasis marmorosella (Wollaston, 1858)
- Blastobasis maroccanella Amsel, 1952
- Blastobasis phycidella (Zeller, 1839)
- Hypatopa ibericella Sinev, 2007
- Hypatopa inunctella Zeller, 1839
- Tecmerium anthophaga (Staudinger, 1870)
- Tecmerium spermophagia Walsingham, 1907
- Zenodochium monopetali Walsingham, 1908
- Zenodochium xylophagum Walsingham, 1908

== Brachodidae ==
- Brachodes funebris (Feisthamel, 1833)
- Brachodes laeta (Staudinger, 1863)
- Brachodes nanetta (Oberthur, 1922)
- Brachodes powelli (Oberthur, 1922)

== Brahmaeidae ==
- Lemonia dumi (Linnaeus, 1761)
- Lemonia philopalus (Donzel, 1842)

== Bucculatricidae ==
- Bucculatrix alaternella Constant, 1890
- Bucculatrix andalusica Deschka, 1980
- Bucculatrix artemisiella Herrich-Schäffer, 1855
- Bucculatrix bechsteinella (Bechstein & Scharfenberg, 1805)
- Bucculatrix cantabricella Chrétien, 1898
- Bucculatrix helichrysella Constant, 1889
- Bucculatrix herbalbella Chrétien, 1915
- Bucculatrix maritima Stainton, 1851
- Bucculatrix myricae Ragonot, 1879
- Bucculatrix nigricomella (Zeller, 1839)
- Bucculatrix phagnalella Walsingham, 1908
- Bucculatrix pseudosylvella Rebel, 1941
- Bucculatrix santolinella Walsingham, 1898

== Carposinidae ==
- Carposina berberidella Herrich-Schäffer, 1854

== Castniidae ==
- Paysandisia archon (Burmeister, 1880)

== Chimabachidae ==
- Dasystoma salicella (Hübner, 1796)
- Diurnea fagella (Denis & Schiffermüller, 1775)
- Diurnea lipsiella (Denis & Schiffermüller, 1775)

== Choreutidae ==
- Anthophila fabriciana (Linnaeus, 1767)
- Choreutis nemorana (Hübner, 1799)
- Choreutis pariana (Clerck, 1759)
- Prochoreutis myllerana (Fabricius, 1794)
- Prochoreutis sehestediana (Fabricius, 1776)
- Tebenna bjerkandrella (Thunberg, 1784)
- Tebenna micalis (Mann, 1857)
- Tebenna pretiosana (Duponchel, 1842)

== Cimeliidae ==
- Axia margarita (Hübner, 1813)

== Coleophoridae ==
- Augasma aeratella (Zeller, 1839)
- Coleophora absinthivora Baldizzone, 1990
- Coleophora achaenivora Hofmann, 1877
- Coleophora acrisella Milliere, 1872
- Coleophora acutiphaga Baldizzone, 1982
- Coleophora adelogrammella Zeller, 1849
- Coleophora adjectella Hering, 1937
- Coleophora aestuariella Bradley, 1984
- Coleophora afrohispana Baldizzone, 1982
- Coleophora afrosarda Baldizzone & Kaltenbach, 1983
- Coleophora agenjoi Toll, 1960
- Coleophora agilis Baldizzone, 1998
- Coleophora agnatella Toll, 1960
- Coleophora ahenella Heinemann, 1877
- Coleophora albarracinica Toll, 1961
- Coleophora albella (Thunberg, 1788)
- Coleophora albicans Zeller, 1849
- Coleophora albicella Constant, 1885
- Coleophora albicinctella Toll, 1960
- Coleophora albicosta (Haworth, 1828)
- Coleophora albicostella (Duponchel, 1842)
- Coleophora albidella (Denis & Schiffermüller, 1775)
- Coleophora albilineella Toll, 1960
- Coleophora albitarsella Zeller, 1849
- Coleophora albostraminata Toll, 1960
- Coleophora alcyonipennella (Kollar, 1832)
- Coleophora alfacarensis Baldizzone, 1998
- Coleophora algeriensis Toll, 1952
- Coleophora algidella Staudinger, 1857
- Coleophora alhamaella Baldizzone, 1980
- Coleophora aliena Baldizzone, 1987
- Coleophora almeriensis Baldizzone & v.d. Wolf, 1999
- Coleophora alticolella Zeller, 1849
- Coleophora amethystinella Ragonot, 1855
- Coleophora anatipenella (Hübner, 1796)
- Coleophora anitella Baldizzone, 1985
- Coleophora arctostaphyli Meder, 1934
- Coleophora arefactella Staudinger, 1859
- Coleophora argenteonivea Walsingham, 1907
- Coleophora argentula (Stephens, 1834)
- Coleophora asthenella Constant, 1893
- Coleophora astragalella Zeller, 1849
- Coleophora auricella (Fabricius, 1794)
- Coleophora autumnella (Duponchel, 1843)
- Coleophora badiipennella (Duponchel, 1843)
- Coleophora ballotella (Fischer v. Röslerstamm, 1839)
- Coleophora bazae Glaser, 1978
- Coleophora berbera Baldizzone, 1988
- Coleophora berlandella Toll, 1956
- Coleophora beticella Baldizzone, 1987
- Coleophora betulella Heinemann, 1877
- Coleophora bifrondella Walsingham, 1891
- Coleophora bilineatella Zeller, 1849
- Coleophora bilineella Herrich-Schäffer, 1855
- Coleophora binderella (Kollar, 1832)
- Coleophora binotapennella (Duponchel, 1843)
- Coleophora biseriatella Staudinger, 1859
- Coleophora brunneosignata Toll, 1944
- Coleophora burmanni Toll, 1952
- Coleophora caelebipennella Zeller, 1839
- Coleophora caespititiella Zeller, 1839
- Coleophora calycotomella Stainton, 1869
- Coleophora cartilaginella Christoph, 1872
- Coleophora centaureivora Baldizzone, 1998
- Coleophora certhiella Baldizzone, 1985
- Coleophora chamaedriella Bruand, 1852
- Coleophora changaica Reznik, 1975
- Coleophora chiclanensis Hering, 1936
- Coleophora ciconiella Herrich-Schäffer, 1855
- Coleophora ciliataephaga Glaser, 1978
- Coleophora cogitata Baldizzone, 1998
- Coleophora colutella (Fabricius, 1794)
- Coleophora congeriella Staudinger, 1859
- Coleophora conspicuella Zeller, 1849
- Coleophora conyzae Zeller, 1868
- Coleophora coronillae Zeller, 1849
- Coleophora corsicella Walsingham, 1898
- Coleophora corticosa Baldizzone & v.d. Wolf, 1999
- Coleophora cracella (Vallot, 1835)
- Coleophora crepidinella Zeller, 1847
- Coleophora cyrniella Rebel, 1926
- Coleophora deauratella Lienig & Zeller, 1846
- Coleophora derrai Baldizzone, 1985
- Coleophora deviella Zeller, 1847
- Coleophora dianthi Herrich-Schäffer, 1855
- Coleophora dianthivora Walsingham, 1901
- Coleophora dignella Toll, 1961
- Coleophora diluta Baldizzone & v.d. Wolf, 1999
- Coleophora discordella Zeller, 1849
- Coleophora dissona Baldizzone, 1998
- Coleophora ditella Zeller, 1849
- Coleophora dubiella Baker, 1888
- Coleophora epijudaica Amsel, 1935
- Coleophora eupepla Gozmány, 1954
- Coleophora eupreta Walsingham, 1907
- Coleophora feoleuca Baldizzone, 1989
- Coleophora festivella Toll, 1952
- Coleophora fiorii Toll, 1954
- Coleophora flaviella Mann, 1857
- Coleophora flavipennella (Duponchel, 1843)
- Coleophora follicularis (Vallot, 1802)
- Coleophora fretella Zeller, 1847
- Coleophora frischella (Linnaeus, 1758)
- Coleophora fuliginosa Baldizzone, 1998
- Coleophora galbulipennella Zeller, 1838
- Coleophora gaviaepennella Toll, 1952
- Coleophora genistae Stainton, 1857
- Coleophora gielisi Baldizzone, 1985
- Coleophora glaucicolella Wood, 1892
- Coleophora granulatella Zeller, 1849
- Coleophora gredosella Baldizzone, 1985
- Coleophora griseomixta Toll, 1960
- Coleophora gryphipennella (Hübner, 1796)
- Coleophora guadicensis Baldizzone, 1989
- Coleophora hackmani (Toll, 1953)
- Coleophora helianthemella Milliere, 1870
- Coleophora helichrysiella Krone, 1909
- Coleophora hiberica Baldizzone, 1985
- Coleophora hieronella Zeller, 1849
- Coleophora horatioella (Agenjo, 1952)
- Coleophora hospitiella Chrétien, 1915
- Coleophora hyssopi Toll, 1961
- Coleophora ibipennella Zeller, 1849
- Coleophora ignotella Toll, 1944
- Coleophora infolliculella Chrétien, 1915
- Coleophora insulicola Toll, 1942
- Coleophora internitens Baldizzone & v.d. Wolf, 1999
- Coleophora inusitatella Caradja, 1920
- Coleophora involucrella Chrétien, 1905
- Coleophora iperspinata Baldizzone & Nel, 2003
- Coleophora isomoera Falkovitsh, 1972
- Coleophora jerusalemella Toll, 1942
- Coleophora juncicolella Stainton, 1851
- Coleophora jynxella Baldizzone, 1987
- Coleophora kahaourella Toll, 1956
- Coleophora kautzi Rebel, 1933
- Coleophora korbi Baldizzone, 1998
- Coleophora kuehnella (Goeze, 1783)
- Coleophora lassella Staudinger, 1859
- Coleophora lebedella Falkovitsh, 1982
- Coleophora leonensis Baldizzone & v.d. Wolf, 2000
- Coleophora lineata Toll, 1960
- Coleophora lineolea (Haworth, 1828)
- Coleophora lixella Zeller, 1849
- Coleophora lusitanica Baldizzone & Corley, 2004
- Coleophora lutatiella Staudinger, 1859
- Coleophora luteochrella Baldizzone & Tabell, 2009
- Coleophora luteolella Staudinger, 1880
- Coleophora lutipennella (Zeller, 1838)
- Coleophora macrobiella Constant, 1885
- Coleophora maritimella Newman, 1863
- Coleophora mausolella Chrétien, 1908
- Coleophora mayrella (Hübner, 1813)
- Coleophora medelichensis Krone, 1908
- Coleophora mediterranea Baldizzone, 1990
- Coleophora mendica Baldizzone & v.d. Wolf, 2000
- Coleophora microalbella Amsel, 1935
- Coleophora micronotella Toll, 1956
- Coleophora milvipennis Zeller, 1839
- Coleophora minipalpella Baldizzone, 1998
- Coleophora monteiroi Toll, 1961
- Coleophora murciana Toll, 1960
- Coleophora nevadella Baldizzone, 1985
- Coleophora niveicostella Zeller, 1839
- Coleophora nutantella Muhlig & Frey, 1857
- Coleophora obtectella Zeller, 1849
- Coleophora occasi Baldizzone & v.d. Wolf, 1999
- Coleophora ochrea (Haworth, 1828)
- Coleophora odorariella Muhlig, 1857
- Coleophora ononidella Milliere, 1879
- Coleophora oriolella Zeller, 1849
- Coleophora ortneri Glaser, 1981
- Coleophora otidipennella (Hübner, 1817)
- Coleophora partitella Zeller, 1849
- Coleophora pellicornella Zerny, 1930
- Coleophora pennella (Denis & Schiffermüller, 1775)
- Coleophora peribenanderi Toll, 1943
- Coleophora perplexella Toll, 1960
- Coleophora plicipunctella Chrétien, 1915
- Coleophora preisseckeri Toll, 1942
- Coleophora pterosparti Mendes, 1910
- Coleophora punctulatella Zeller, 1849
- Coleophora pyrenaica Baldizzone, 1980
- Coleophora pyrrhulipennella Zeller, 1839
- Coleophora ravillella Toll, 1961
- Coleophora retifera Meyrick, 1922
- Coleophora ribasella Baldizzone, 1982
- Coleophora riffelensis Rebel, 1913
- Coleophora rudella Toll, 1944
- Coleophora salicorniae Heinemann & Wocke, 1877
- Coleophora salinella Stainton, 1859
- Coleophora santolinella Constant, 1890
- Coleophora saponariella Heeger, 1848
- Coleophora saxicolella (Duponchel, 1843)
- Coleophora scabrida Toll, 1959
- Coleophora schmidti Toll, 1960
- Coleophora semicinerea Staudinger, 1859
- Coleophora sergiella Falkovitsh, 1979
- Coleophora serinipennella Christoph, 1872
- Coleophora serpylletorum Hering, 1889
- Coleophora serratella (Linnaeus, 1761)
- Coleophora siccifolia Stainton, 1856
- Coleophora sisteronica Toll, 1961
- Coleophora sodae Baldizzone & Nel, 1993
- Coleophora solenella Staudinger, 1859
- Coleophora solidaginella Staudinger, 1859
- Coleophora soriaella Baldizzone, 1980
- Coleophora spinella (Schrank, 1802)
- Coleophora spumosella Staudinger, 1859
- Coleophora staehelinella Walsingham, 1891
- Coleophora sternipennella (Zetterstedt, 1839)
- Coleophora striatipennella Nylander in Tengstrom, 1848
- Coleophora strigosella Toll, 1960
- Coleophora striolatella Zeller, 1849
- Coleophora struella Staudinger, 1859
- Coleophora strutiella Glaser, 1975
- Coleophora supinella Ortner, 1949
- Coleophora taeniipennella Herrich-Schäffer, 1855
- Coleophora tamesis Waters, 1929
- Coleophora tanaceti Muhlig, 1865
- Coleophora tanitella Baldizzone, 1982
- Coleophora taygeti Baldizzone, 1983
- Coleophora therinella Tengstrom, 1848
- Coleophora traugotti Baldizzone, 1985
- Coleophora treskaensis Toll & Amsel, 1967
- Coleophora trichopterella Baldizzone, 1985
- Coleophora tridentifera Baldizzone, 1985
- Coleophora trifariella Zeller, 1849
- Coleophora trifolii (Curtis, 1832)
- Coleophora trigeminella Fuchs, 1881
- Coleophora trochilella (Duponchel, 1843)
- Coleophora turbatella Toll, 1944
- Coleophora turolella Zerny, 1927
- Coleophora unipunctella Zeller, 1849
- Coleophora uralensis Toll, 1961
- Coleophora valesianella Zeller, 1849
- Coleophora vanderwolfi Baldizzone, 1985
- Coleophora varensis Baldizzone & Nel, 1993
- Coleophora ventadelsolella Glaser, 1981
- Coleophora vermiculatella Glaser, 1975
- Coleophora versurella Zeller, 1849
- Coleophora vestalella Staudinger, 1859
- Coleophora vestianella (Linnaeus, 1758)
- Coleophora vibicella (Hübner, 1813)
- Coleophora vibicigerella Zeller, 1839
- Coleophora vicinella Zeller, 1849
- Coleophora virgaureae Stainton, 1857
- Coleophora vivesella Baldizzone, 1987
- Coleophora vulnerariae Zeller, 1839
- Coleophora vulpecula Zeller, 1849
- Coleophora wockeella Zeller, 1849
- Coleophora wolschrijni Baldizzone & v.d. Wolf, 2000
- Coleophora zelleriella Heinemann, 1854
- Coleophora zernyi Toll, 1944
- Goniodoma auroguttella (Fischer v. Röslerstamm, 1841)
- Goniodoma limoniella (Stainton, 1884)
- Ischnophanes aquilina Baldizzone & v.d. Wolf, 2003
- Ischnophanes baldizzonella Vives, 1983
- Ischnophanes excentra Baldizzone & v.d. Wolf, 2003
- Metriotes jaeckhi Baldizzone, 1985

== Cosmopterigidae ==
- Alloclita recisella Staudinger, 1859
- Anatrachyntis badia (Hodges, 1962)
- Anatrachyntis simplex (Walsingham, 1891)
- Ascalenia vanella (Frey, 1860)
- Bifascia nigralbella (Chrétien, 1915)
- Coccidiphila danilevskyi Sinev, 1997
- Coccidiphila gerasimovi Danilevsky, 1950
- Cosmopterix athesiae Huemer & Koster, 2006
- Cosmopterix coryphaea Walsingham, 1908
- Cosmopterix crassicervicella Chrétien, 1896
- Cosmopterix lienigiella Zeller, 1846
- Cosmopterix orichalcea Stainton, 1861
- Cosmopterix pararufella Riedl, 1976
- Cosmopterix pulchrimella Chambers, 1875
- Cosmopterix schmidiella Frey, 1856
- Cosmopterix scribaiella Zeller, 1850
- Cosmopterix zieglerella (Hübner, 1810)
- Eteobalea albiapicella (Duponchel, 1843)
- Eteobalea alypella (Klimesch, 1946)
- Eteobalea anonymella (Riedl, 1965)
- Eteobalea beata (Walsingham, 1907)
- Eteobalea dohrnii (Zeller, 1847)
- Eteobalea intermediella (Riedl, 1966)
- Eteobalea isabellella (O. G. Costa, 1836)
- Eteobalea serratella (Treitschke, 1833)
- Eteobalea sumptuosella (Lederer, 1855)
- Eteobalea teucrii (Walsingham, 1907)
- Gisilia stereodoxa (Meyrick, 1925)
- Isidiella divitella (Constant, 1885)
- Isidiella nickerlii (Nickerl, 1864)
- Limnaecia phragmitella Stainton, 1851
- Pancalia leuwenhoekella (Linnaeus, 1761)
- Pancalia nodosella (Bruand, 1851)
- Pancalia schwarzella (Fabricius, 1798)
- Pyroderces argyrogrammos (Zeller, 1847)
- Pyroderces caesaris Gozmány, 1957
- Pyroderces klimeschi Rebel, 1938
- Pyroderces tethysella Koster & Sinev, 2003
- Pyroderces wolschrijni Koster & Sinev, 2003
- Ramphis ibericus Riedl, 1969
- Sorhagenia janiszewskae Riedl, 1962
- Sorhagenia lophyrella (Douglas, 1846)
- Sorhagenia rhamniella (Zeller, 1839)
- Vulcaniella extremella (Wocke, 1871)
- Vulcaniella fiordalisa (Petry, 1904)
- Vulcaniella gielisi Koster & Sinev, 2003
- Vulcaniella grabowiella (Staudinger, 1859)
- Vulcaniella pomposella (Zeller, 1839)
- Vulcaniella rosmarinella (Walsingham, 1891)

== Cossidae ==
- Acossus terebra (Denis & Schiffermüller, 1775)
- Cossus cossus (Linnaeus, 1758)
- Dyspessa foeda (Swinhoe, 1899)
- Dyspessa ulula (Borkhausen, 1790)
- Parahypopta caestrum (Hübner, 1808)
- Phragmataecia castaneae (Hübner, 1790)
- Stygia australis Latreille, 1804
- Wiltshirocossus aries (Pungeler, 1902)
- Zeuzera pyrina (Linnaeus, 1761)

== Crambidae ==
- Acentria ephemerella (Denis & Schiffermüller, 1775)
- Achyra murcialis (Ragonot, 1895)
- Achyra nudalis (Hübner, 1796)
- Agriphila argentistrigellus (Ragonot, 1888)
- Agriphila brioniellus (Zerny, 1914)
- Agriphila cyrenaicellus (Ragonot, 1887)
- Agriphila dalmatinellus (Hampson, 1900)
- Agriphila deliella (Hübner, 1813)
- Agriphila geniculea (Haworth, 1811)
- Agriphila inquinatella (Denis & Schiffermüller, 1775)
- Agriphila latistria (Haworth, 1811)
- Agriphila selasella (Hübner, 1813)
- Agriphila straminella (Denis & Schiffermüller, 1775)
- Agriphila tersellus (Lederer, 1855)
- Agriphila trabeatellus (Herrich-Schäffer, 1848)
- Agriphila tristella (Denis & Schiffermüller, 1775)
- Agrotera nemoralis (Scopoli, 1763)
- Anania coronata (Hufnagel, 1767)
- Anania crocealis (Hübner, 1796)
- Anania funebris (Strom, 1768)
- Anania fuscalis (Denis & Schiffermüller, 1775)
- Anania hortulata (Linnaeus, 1758)
- Anania lancealis (Denis & Schiffermüller, 1775)
- Anania stachydalis (Germar, 1821)
- Anania terrealis (Treitschke, 1829)
- Anania testacealis (Zeller, 1847)
- Anania verbascalis (Denis & Schiffermüller, 1775)
- Anarpia incertalis (Duponchel, 1832)
- Ancylolomia disparalis Hübner, 1825
- Ancylolomia inornata Staudinger, 1870
- Ancylolomia palpella (Denis & Schiffermüller, 1775)
- Ancylolomia tentaculella (Hübner, 1796)
- Ancylolomia tripolitella Rebel, 1909
- Angustalius malacellus (Duponchel, 1836)
- Antigastra catalaunalis (Duponchel, 1833)
- Aporodes floralis (Hübner, 1809)
- Arnia nervosalis Guenée, 1849
- Atralata albofascialis (Treitschke, 1829)
- Calamotropha fuscilineatellus (D. Lucas, 1938)
- Calamotropha paludella (Hübner, 1824)
- Cataclysta lemnata (Linnaeus, 1758)
- Cataonia erubescens (Christoph, 1877)
- Catoptria bolivari (Agenjo, 1947)
- Catoptria digitellus (Herrich-Schäffer, 1849)
- Catoptria dimorphellus (Staudinger, 1882)
- Catoptria falsella (Denis & Schiffermüller, 1775)
- Catoptria fulgidella (Hübner, 1813)
- Catoptria lythargyrella (Hübner, 1796)
- Catoptria mytilella (Hübner, 1805)
- Catoptria permutatellus (Herrich-Schäffer, 1848)
- Catoptria petrificella (Hübner, 1796)
- Catoptria pinella (Linnaeus, 1758)
- Catoptria staudingeri (Zeller, 1863)
- Chilo agamemnon Błeszyński, 1962
- Chilo luteellus (Motschulsky, 1866)
- Chilo phragmitella (Hübner, 1805)
- Chilo suppressalis (Walker, 1863)
- Cholius luteolaris (Scopoli, 1772)
- Chrysocrambus craterella (Scopoli, 1763)
- Chrysocrambus dentuellus (Pierce & Metcalfe, 1938)
- Chrysocrambus linetella (Fabricius, 1781)
- Chrysocrambus sardiniellus (Turati, 1911)
- Chrysoteuchia culmella (Linnaeus, 1758)
- Cornifrons ulceratalis Lederer, 1858
- Crambus lathoniellus (Zincken, 1817)
- Crambus pascuella (Linnaeus, 1758)
- Crambus perlella (Scopoli, 1763)
- Crambus uliginosellus Zeller, 1850
- Cynaeda dentalis (Denis & Schiffermüller, 1775)
- Diasemia reticularis (Linnaeus, 1761)
- Diasemiopsis ramburialis (Duponchel, 1834)
- Diplopseustis perieresalis (Walker, 1859)
- Dolicharthria aetnaealis (Duponchel, 1833)
- Dolicharthria bruguieralis (Duponchel, 1833)
- Dolicharthria daralis (Chrétien, 1911)
- Dolicharthria punctalis (Denis & Schiffermüller, 1775)
- Donacaula forficella (Thunberg, 1794)
- Duponchelia fovealis Zeller, 1847
- Ecpyrrhorrhoe diffusalis (Guenée, 1854)
- Ecpyrrhorrhoe rubiginalis (Hübner, 1796)
- Elophila feili Speidel, 2002
- Elophila nymphaeata (Linnaeus, 1758)
- Emprepes pudicalis (Duponchel, 1832)
- Epascestria pustulalis (Hübner, 1823)
- Euchromius anapiellus (Zeller, 1847)
- Euchromius bella (Hübner, 1796)
- Euchromius cambridgei (Zeller, 1867)
- Euchromius gozmanyi Błeszyński, 1961
- Euchromius gratiosella (Caradja, 1910)
- Euchromius ocellea (Haworth, 1811)
- Euchromius ramburiellus (Duponchel, 1836)
- Euchromius rayatellus (Amsel, 1949)
- Euchromius superbellus (Zeller, 1849)
- Euchromius vinculellus (Zeller, 1847)
- Euclasta varii Popescu-Gorj & Constantinescu, 1973
- Eudonia angustea (Curtis, 1827)
- Eudonia delunella (Stainton, 1849)
- Eudonia lacustrata (Panzer, 1804)
- Eudonia lineola (Curtis, 1827)
- Eudonia mercurella (Linnaeus, 1758)
- Eudonia murana (Curtis, 1827)
- Eudonia pallida (Curtis, 1827)
- Eudonia petrophila (Standfuss, 1848)
- Eudonia phaeoleuca (Zeller, 1846)
- Eudonia sudetica (Zeller, 1839)
- Eudonia truncicolella (Stainton, 1849)
- Eurrhypis guttulalis (Herrich-Schäffer, 1848)
- Eurrhypis pollinalis (Denis & Schiffermüller, 1775)
- Evergestis aenealis (Denis & Schiffermüller, 1775)
- Evergestis alborivulalis (Eversmann, 1844)
- Evergestis desertalis (Hübner, 1813)
- Evergestis dumerlei Leraut, 2003
- Evergestis dusmeti Agenjo, 1955
- Evergestis extimalis (Scopoli, 1763)
- Evergestis forficalis (Linnaeus, 1758)
- Evergestis frumentalis (Linnaeus, 1761)
- Evergestis isatidalis (Duponchel, 1833)
- Evergestis limbata (Linnaeus, 1767)
- Evergestis lupalis Zerny, 1928
- Evergestis marionalis Leraut, 2003
- Evergestis marocana (D. Lucas, 1856)
- Evergestis merceti Agenjo, 1933
- Evergestis mundalis (Guenée, 1854)
- Evergestis pallidata (Hufnagel, 1767)
- Evergestis pechi (Bethune-Baker, 1885)
- Evergestis plumbofascialis (Ragonot, 1894)
- Evergestis politalis (Denis & Schiffermüller, 1775)
- Evergestis sophialis (Fabricius, 1787)
- Evergestis umbrosalis (Fischer v. Röslerstamm, 1842)
- Friedlanderia cicatricella (Hübner, 1824)
- Heliothela wulfeniana (Scopoli, 1763)
- Hellula undalis (Fabricius, 1781)
- Herpetogramma licarsisalis (Walker, 1859)
- Hodebertia testalis (Fabricius, 1794)
- Hydriris ornatalis (Duponchel, 1832)
- Hyperlais cruzae (Agenjo, 1953)
- Hyperlais glyceralis (Staudinger, 1859)
- Hyperlais nemausalis (Duponchel, 1834)
- Hyperlais rivasalis (Vazquez, 1905)
- Hyperlais siccalis Guenée, 1854
- Loxostege aeruginalis (Hübner, 1796)
- Loxostege comptalis (Freyer, 1848)
- Loxostege fascialis (Hübner, 1796)
- Loxostege manualis (Geyer, 1832)
- Loxostege scutalis (Hübner, 1813)
- Loxostege sticticalis (Linnaeus, 1761)
- Loxostege tesselalis (Guenée, 1854)
- Mecyna andalusica (Staudinger, 1879)
- Mecyna asinalis (Hübner, 1819)
- Mecyna auralis (Peyerimhoff, 1872)
- Mecyna flavalis (Denis & Schiffermüller, 1775)
- Mecyna lutealis (Duponchel, 1833)
- Mecyna trinalis (Denis & Schiffermüller, 1775)
- Mesocrambus candiellus (Herrich-Schäffer, 1848)
- Metacrambus carectellus (Zeller, 1847)
- Metacrambus marabut Błeszyński, 1965
- Metacrambus pallidellus (Duponchel, 1836)
- Metacrambus salahinellus (Chrétien, 1917)
- Metasia carnealis (Treitschke, 1829)
- Metasia corsicalis (Duponchel, 1833)
- Metasia cuencalis Ragonot, 1894
- Metasia hymenalis Guenée, 1854
- Metasia ibericalis Ragonot, 1894
- Metasia olbienalis Guenée, 1854
- Metasia ophialis (Treitschke, 1829)
- Metasia suppandalis (Hübner, 1823)
- Metaxmeste phrygialis (Hübner, 1796)
- Metaxmeste schrankiana (Hochenwarth, 1785)
- Nascia cilialis (Hübner, 1796)
- Nomophila noctuella (Denis & Schiffermüller, 1775)
- Nymphula nitidulata (Hufnagel, 1767)
- Orenaia alpestralis (Fabricius, 1787)
- Orenaia helveticalis (Herrich-Schäffer, 1851)
- Ostrinia nubilalis (Hübner, 1796)
- Palepicorsia ustrinalis (Christoph, 1877)
- Palpita vitrealis (Rossi, 1794)
- Paracorsia repandalis (Denis & Schiffermüller, 1775)
- Parapoynx andalusica Speidel, 1982
- Parapoynx fluctuosalis (Zeller, 1852)
- Parapoynx stagnalis (Zeller, 1852)
- Parapoynx stratiotata (Linnaeus, 1758)
- Paratalanta hyalinalis (Hübner, 1796)
- Paratalanta pandalis (Hübner, 1825)
- Pediasia bolivarellus (A. Schmidt, 1930)
- Pediasia contaminella (Hübner, 1796)
- Pediasia desertellus (Lederer, 1855)
- Pediasia hispanica Błeszyński, 1956
- Pediasia ribbeellus (Caradja, 1910)
- Pediasia serraticornis (Hampson, 1900)
- Pediasia siculellus (Duponchel, 1836)
- Platytes alpinella (Hübner, 1813)
- Platytes cerussella (Denis & Schiffermüller, 1775)
- Pleuroptya balteata (Fabricius, 1798)
- Pleuroptya ruralis (Scopoli, 1763)
- Psammotis pulveralis (Hübner, 1796)
- Pseudobissetia terrestrellus (Christoph, 1885)
- Pyrausta acontialis (Staudinger, 1859)
- Pyrausta aerealis (Hübner, 1793)
- Pyrausta aurata (Scopoli, 1763)
- Pyrausta castalis Treitschke, 1829
- Pyrausta cingulata (Linnaeus, 1758)
- Pyrausta coracinalis Leraut, 1982
- Pyrausta despicata (Scopoli, 1763)
- Pyrausta limbopunctalis (Herrich-Schäffer, 1849)
- Pyrausta nigrata (Scopoli, 1763)
- Pyrausta obfuscata (Scopoli, 1763)
- Pyrausta ostrinalis (Hübner, 1796)
- Pyrausta pellicalis (Staudinger, 1871)
- Pyrausta porphyralis (Denis & Schiffermüller, 1775)
- Pyrausta purpuralis (Linnaeus, 1758)
- Pyrausta sanguinalis (Linnaeus, 1767)
- Pyrausta virginalis Duponchel, 1832
- Sceliodes laisalis (Walker, 1859)
- Schoenobius gigantella (Denis & Schiffermüller, 1775)
- Scirpophaga praelata (Scopoli, 1763)
- Sclerocona acutella (Eversmann, 1842)
- Scoparia ambigualis (Treitschke, 1829)
- Scoparia basistrigalis Knaggs, 1866
- Scoparia gallica Peyerimhoff, 1873
- Scoparia ingratella (Zeller, 1846)
- Scoparia pyralella (Denis & Schiffermüller, 1775)
- Scoparia staudingeralis (Mabille, 1869)
- Scoparia subfusca Haworth, 1811
- Sitochroa palealis (Denis & Schiffermüller, 1775)
- Sitochroa verticalis (Linnaeus, 1758)
- Spoladea recurvalis (Fabricius, 1775)
- Talis caboensis Asselbergs, 2009
- Tegostoma comparalis (Hübner, 1796)
- Thisanotia chrysonuchella (Scopoli, 1763)
- Thopeutis galleriellus (Ragonot, 1892)
- Titanio normalis (Hübner, 1796)
- Titanio tarraconensis Leraut & Luquet, 1982
- Udea alpinalis (Denis & Schiffermüller, 1775)
- Udea austriacalis (Herrich-Schäffer, 1851)
- Udea bipunctalis (Herrich-Schäffer, 1851)
- Udea conquisitalis (Guenée, 1848)
- Udea costalis (Eversmann, 1852)
- Udea cyanalis (La Harpe, 1855)
- Udea elutalis (Denis & Schiffermüller, 1775)
- Udea ferrugalis (Hübner, 1796)
- Udea fimbriatralis (Duponchel, 1834)
- Udea fulvalis (Hübner, 1809)
- Udea institalis (Hübner, 1819)
- Udea numeralis (Hübner, 1796)
- Udea prunalis (Denis & Schiffermüller, 1775)
- Udea rhododendronalis (Duponchel, 1834)
- Udea uliginosalis (Stephens, 1834)
- Udea zernyi (Klima, 1939)
- Uresiphita gilvata (Fabricius, 1794)
- Xanthocrambus caducellus (Muller-Rutz, 1909)
- Xanthocrambus delicatellus (Zeller, 1863)

== Douglasiidae ==
- Klimeschia thymetella (Staudinger, 1859)
- Klimeschia transversella (Zeller, 1839)
- Tinagma balteolella (Fischer von Röslerstamm, 1841)
- Tinagma ocnerostomella (Stainton, 1850)
- Tinagma perdicella Zeller, 1839

== Drepanidae ==
- Achlya flavicornis (Linnaeus, 1758)
- Cilix algirica Leraut, 2006
- Cilix glaucata (Scopoli, 1763)
- Cilix hispanica De-Gregorio, Torruella, Miret, Casas & Figueras, 2002
- Cymatophorina diluta (Denis & Schiffermüller, 1775)
- Drepana curvatula (Borkhausen, 1790)
- Drepana falcataria (Linnaeus, 1758)
- Falcaria lacertinaria (Linnaeus, 1758)
- Habrosyne pyritoides (Hufnagel, 1766)
- Ochropacha duplaris (Linnaeus, 1761)
- Polyploca ridens (Fabricius, 1787)
- Sabra harpagula (Esper, 1786)
- Tethea ocularis (Linnaeus, 1767)
- Tethea or (Denis & Schiffermüller, 1775)
- Thyatira batis (Linnaeus, 1758)
- Watsonalla binaria (Hufnagel, 1767)
- Watsonalla cultraria (Fabricius, 1775)
- Watsonalla uncinula (Borkhausen, 1790)

== Elachistidae ==
- Agonopterix adspersella (Kollar, 1832)
- Agonopterix alstromeriana (Clerck, 1759)
- Agonopterix arenella (Denis & Schiffermüller, 1775)
- Agonopterix aspersella (Constant, 1888)
- Agonopterix assimilella (Treitschke, 1832)
- Agonopterix atomella (Denis & Schiffermüller, 1775)
- Agonopterix cachritis (Staudinger, 1859)
- Agonopterix capreolella (Zeller, 1839)
- Agonopterix carduella (Hübner, 1817)
- Agonopterix chironiella (Constant, 1893)
- Agonopterix ciliella (Stainton, 1849)
- Agonopterix cnicella (Treitschke, 1832)
- Agonopterix curvipunctosa (Haworth, 1811)
- Agonopterix ferulae (Zeller, 1847)
- Agonopterix fruticosella (Walsingham, 1903)
- Agonopterix heracliana (Linnaeus, 1758)
- Agonopterix kaekeritziana (Linnaeus, 1767)
- Agonopterix laterella (Denis & Schiffermüller, 1775)
- Agonopterix liturosa (Haworth, 1811)
- Agonopterix mendesi Corley, 2002
- Agonopterix nanatella (Stainton, 1849)
- Agonopterix nervosa (Haworth, 1811)
- Agonopterix nodiflorella (Milliere, 1866)
- Agonopterix ocellana (Fabricius, 1775)
- Agonopterix oinochroa (Turati, 1879)
- Agonopterix pallorella (Zeller, 1839)
- Agonopterix perstrigella (Chrétien, 1925)
- Agonopterix propinquella (Treitschke, 1835)
- Agonopterix purpurea (Haworth, 1811)
- Agonopterix rotundella (Douglas, 1846)
- Agonopterix rutana (Fabricius, 1794)
- Agonopterix scopariella (Heinemann, 1870)
- Agonopterix selini (Heinemann, 1870)
- Agonopterix senecionis (Nickerl, 1864)
- Agonopterix squamosa (Mann, 1864)
- Agonopterix straminella (Staudinger, 1859)
- Agonopterix subpropinquella (Stainton, 1849)
- Agonopterix thapsiella (Zeller, 1847)
- Agonopterix umbellana (Fabricius, 1794)
- Agonopterix vendettella (Chrétien, 1908)
- Agonopterix yeatiana (Fabricius, 1781)
- Anchinia cristalis (Scopoli, 1763)
- Anchinia laureolella Herrich-Schäffer, 1854
- Blastodacna atra (Haworth, 1828)
- Blastodacna hellerella (Duponchel, 1838)
- Cacochroa permixtella (Herrich-Schäffer, 1854)
- Chrysoclista linneella (Clerck, 1759)
- Chrysoclista splendida Karsholt, 1997
- Depressaria adustatella Turati, 1927
- Depressaria albipunctella (Denis & Schiffermüller, 1775)
- Depressaria badiella (Hübner, 1796)
- Depressaria beckmanni Heinemann, 1870
- Depressaria cervicella Herrich-Schäffer, 1854
- Depressaria chaerophylli Zeller, 1839
- Depressaria cinderella Corley, 2002
- Depressaria corticinella Zeller, 1854
- Depressaria daucella (Denis & Schiffermüller, 1775)
- Depressaria depressana (Fabricius, 1775)
- Depressaria discipunctella Herrich-Schäffer, 1854
- Depressaria douglasella Stainton, 1849
- Depressaria eryngiella Milliere, 1881
- Depressaria genistella Walsingham, 1903
- Depressaria hofmanni Stainton, 1861
- Depressaria incognitella Hannemann, 1990
- Depressaria krasnowodskella Hannemann, 1953
- Depressaria libanotidella Schlager, 1849
- Depressaria marcella Rebel, 1901
- Depressaria pimpinellae Zeller, 1839
- Depressaria pulcherrimella Stainton, 1849
- Depressaria radiella (Goeze, 1783)
- Depressaria sordidatella Tengstrom, 1848
- Depressaria tenebricosa Zeller, 1854
- Depressaria ultimella Stainton, 1849
- Depressaria ululana Rossler, 1866
- Depressaria velox Staudinger, 1859
- Depressaria veneficella Zeller, 1847
- Depressaria erinaceella Staudinger, 1870
- Depressaria hirtipalpis Zeller, 1854
- Depressaria peniculatella Turati, 1922
- Dystebenna stephensi (Stainton, 1849)
- Elachista adscitella Stainton, 1851
- Elachista amparoae Traugott-Olsen, 1992
- Elachista anitella Traugott-Olsen, 1985
- Elachista argentella (Clerck, 1759)
- Elachista baldizzonella Traugott-Olsen, 1985
- Elachista bazaella Traugott-Olsen, 1992
- Elachista bazaensis Traugott-Olsen, 1990
- Elachista bedellella (Sircom, 1848)
- Elachista bengtssoni Traugott-Olsen, 1992
- Elachista berndtiella Traugott-Olsen, 1985
- Elachista catalana Parenti, 1978
- Elachista catalunella Traugott-Olsen, 1992
- Elachista chrysodesmella Zeller, 1850
- Elachista cirrhoplica Kaila, 2012
- Elachista collitella (Duponchel, 1843)
- Elachista cuencaensis Traugott-Olsen, 1992
- Elachista deceptricula Staudinger, 1880
- Elachista disemiella Zeller, 1847
- Elachista dispunctella (Duponchel, 1843)
- Elachista fuscibasella Chrétien, 1915
- Elachista galactitella (Eversmann, 1844)
- Elachista gerdmaritella Traugott-Olsen, 1992
- Elachista gielisi Traugott-Olsen, 1992
- Elachista glaseri Traugott-Olsen, 1992
- Elachista gormella Nielsen & Traugott-Olsen, 1987
- Elachista hedemanni Rebel, 1899
- Elachista heringi Rebel, 1899
- Elachista hispanica Traugott-Olsen, 1992
- Elachista istanella Nielsen & Traugott-Olsen, 1987
- Elachista louiseae Traugott-Olsen, 1992
- Elachista lugdunensis Frey, 1859
- Elachista luqueti Traugott-Olsen, 1992
- Elachista maboulella Chrétien, 1915
- Elachista madridensis Traugott-Olsen, 1992
- Elachista nevadensis Parenti, 1978
- Elachista nuraghella Amsel, 1951
- Elachista obliquella Stainton, 1854
- Elachista occidentella Traugott-Olsen, 1992
- Elachista oukaimedenensis Traugott-Olsen, 1988
- Elachista passerini Traugott-Olsen, 1996
- Elachista pollinariella Zeller, 1839
- Elachista rikkeae Traugott-Olsen, 1992
- Elachista squamosella (Duponchel, 1843)
- Elachista subocellea (Stephens, 1834)
- Elachista teruelensis Traugott-Olsen, 1990
- Elachista totanaensis Traugott-Olsen, 1992
- Elachista toveella Traugott-Olsen, 1985
- Elachista tribertiella Traugott-Olsen, 1985
- Elachista veletaella Traugott-Olsen, 1992
- Elachista vivesi Traugott-Olsen, 1992
- Elachista zuernbaueri Traugott-Olsen, 1990
- Elachista alicanta Kaila, 2005
- Elachista atricomella Stainton, 1849
- Elachista biatomella (Stainton, 1848)
- Elachista boursini Amsel, 1951
- Elachista cinereopunctella (Haworth, 1828)
- Elachista consortella Stainton, 1851
- Elachista contaminatella Zeller, 1847
- Elachista exactella (Herrich-Schäffer, 1855)
- Elachista freyerella (Hübner, 1825)
- Elachista geminatella (Herrich-Schäffer, 1855)
- Elachista glaserella Traugott-Olsen, 2000
- Elachista ibericella Traugott-Olsen, 1995
- Elachista lastrella Chrétien, 1896
- Elachista minuta (Parenti, 2003)
- Elachista nevadella Traugott-Olsen, 2000
- Elachista nobilella Zeller, 1839
- Elachista pigerella (Herrich-Schäffer, 1854)
- Elachista scirpi Stainton, 1887
- Elachista stabilella Stainton, 1858
- Elachista tetragonella (Herrich-Schäffer, 1855)
- Elachista vulcana Kaila, 2011
- Ethmia aurifluella (Hübner, 1810)
- Ethmia bipunctella (Fabricius, 1775)
- Ethmia candidella (Alphéraky, 1908)
- Ethmia chrysopyga (Zeller, 1844)
- Ethmia dodecea (Haworth, 1828)
- Ethmia fumidella (Wocke, 1850)
- Ethmia iranella Zerny, 1940
- Ethmia lepidella (Chrétien, 1907)
- Ethmia penyagolosella Domingo & Baixeras, 2003
- Ethmia pusiella (Linnaeus, 1758)
- Ethmia quadrillella (Goeze, 1783)
- Ethmia terminella T. B. Fletcher, 1938
- Exaeretia lutosella (Herrich-Schäffer, 1854)
- Fuchsia huertasi Vives, 1995
- Haplochrois albanica (Rebel & Zerny, 1932)
- Haplochrois buvati (Baldizzone, 1985)
- Haplochrois ochraceella (Rebel, 1903)
- Heinemannia albidorsella (Staudinger, 1877)
- Heinemannia festivella (Denis & Schiffermüller, 1775)
- Hypercallia citrinalis (Scopoli, 1763)
- Orophia denisella (Denis & Schiffermüller, 1775)
- Orophia ferrugella (Denis & Schiffermüller, 1775)
- Orophia sordidella (Hübner, 1796)
- Perittia echiella (de Joannis, 1902)
- Perittia granadensis (Traugott-Olsen, 1995)
- Perittia piperatella (Staudinger, 1859)
- Semioscopis steinkellneriana (Denis & Schiffermüller, 1775)
- Spuleria flavicaput (Haworth, 1828)
- Stephensia brunnichella (Linnaeus, 1767)
- Stephensia calpella (Walsingham, 1908)
- Stephensia unipunctella Nielsen & Traugott-Olsen, 1978

== Endromidae ==
- Endromis versicolora (Linnaeus, 1758)

== Epermeniidae ==
- Epermenia aequidentellus (E. Hofmann, 1867)
- Epermenia chaerophyllella (Goeze, 1783)
- Epermenia insecurella (Stainton, 1854)
- Epermenia strictellus (Wocke, 1867)
- Epermenia iniquellus (Wocke, 1867)
- Epermenia ochreomaculellus (Milliere, 1854)
- Epermenia pontificella (Hübner, 1796)
- Epermenia scurella (Stainton, 1851)
- Ochromolopis ictella (Hübner, 1813)
- Ochromolopis staintonellus (Milliere, 1869)

== Epipyropidae ==
- Ommatissopyrops lusitanicus Bivar de Sousa & Quartau, 1998
- Ommatissopyrops schawerdae (Zerny, 1929)

== Erebidae ==
- Albarracina warionis (Oberthur, 1881)
- Amata phegea (Linnaeus, 1758)
- Apaidia mesogona (Godart, 1824)
- Apaidia rufeola (Rambur, 1832)
- Apopestes spectrum (Esper, 1787)
- Araeopteron ecphaea Hampson, 1914
- Arctia caja (Linnaeus, 1758)
- Arctia festiva (Hufnagel, 1766)
- Arctia villica (Linnaeus, 1758)
- Arctornis l-nigrum (Muller, 1764)
- Artimelia latreillei (Godart, 1823)
- Atlantarctia tigrina (Villers, 1789)
- Atolmis rubricollis (Linnaeus, 1758)
- Autophila dilucida (Hübner, 1808)
- Autophila cataphanes (Hübner, 1813)
- Callimorpha dominula (Linnaeus, 1758)
- Calliteara pudibunda (Linnaeus, 1758)
- Calyptra thalictri (Borkhausen, 1790)
- Catephia alchymista (Denis & Schiffermüller, 1775)
- Catocala coniuncta (Esper, 1787)
- Catocala conversa (Esper, 1783)
- Catocala dilecta (Hübner, 1808)
- Catocala diversa (Geyer, 1828)
- Catocala electa (Vieweg, 1790)
- Catocala elocata (Esper, 1787)
- Catocala fraxini (Linnaeus, 1758)
- Catocala fulminea (Scopoli, 1763)
- Catocala mariana Rambur, 1858
- Catocala nupta (Linnaeus, 1767)
- Catocala nymphaea (Esper, 1787)
- Catocala nymphagoga (Esper, 1787)
- Catocala oberthuri Austaut, 1879
- Catocala optata (Godart, 1824)
- Catocala promissa (Denis & Schiffermüller, 1775)
- Catocala puerpera (Giorna, 1791)
- Catocala sponsa (Linnaeus, 1767)
- Cerocala scapulosa (Hübner, 1808)
- Chelis maculosa (Gerning, 1780)
- Clytie illunaris (Hübner, 1813)
- Colobochyla salicalis (Denis & Schiffermüller, 1775)
- Coscinia cribraria (Linnaeus, 1758)
- Coscinia mariarosae Exposito, 1991
- Coscinia romeii Sagarra, 1924
- Coscinia striata (Linnaeus, 1758)
- Cybosia mesomella (Linnaeus, 1758)
- Cymbalophora pudica (Esper, 1785)
- Diacrisia sannio (Linnaeus, 1758)
- Diaphora mendica (Clerck, 1759)
- Dicallomera fascelina (Linnaeus, 1758)
- Drasteria cailino (Lefebvre, 1827)
- Dysauxes ancilla (Linnaeus, 1767)
- Dysauxes punctata (Fabricius, 1781)
- Dysgonia algira (Linnaeus, 1767)
- Dysgonia torrida (Guenée, 1852)
- Eilema albicosta (Rogenhofer, 1894)
- Eilema bipuncta (Hübner, 1824)
- Eilema caniola (Hübner, 1808)
- Eilema depressa (Esper, 1787)
- Eilema griseola (Hübner, 1803)
- Eilema interpositella Strand, 1920
- Eilema lurideola (Zincken, 1817)
- Eilema lutarella (Linnaeus, 1758)
- Eilema marcida (Mann, 1859)
- Eilema palliatella (Scopoli, 1763)
- Eilema predotae (Schawerda, 1927)
- Eilema pseudocomplana (Daniel, 1939)
- Eilema pygmaeola (Doubleday, 1847)
- Eilema rungsi Toulgoët, 1960
- Eilema sororcula (Hufnagel, 1766)
- Eilema uniola (Rambur, 1866)
- Eublemma albida Duponchel, 1843
- Eublemma amoena (Hübner, 1803)
- Eublemma candicans (Rambur, 1858)
- Eublemma candidana (Fabricius, 1794)
- Eublemma cochylioides (Guenée, 1852)
- Eublemma himmighoffeni (Milliere, 1867)
- Eublemma minutata (Fabricius, 1794)
- Eublemma ostrina (Hübner, 1808)
- Eublemma parva (Hübner, 1808)
- Eublemma polygramma (Duponchel, 1842)
- Eublemma pura (Hübner, 1813)
- Eublemma purpurina (Denis & Schiffermüller, 1775)
- Eublemma rietzi Fibiger, Ronkay, Zilli & Yela, 2010
- Eublemma rosea (Hübner, 1790)
- Eublemma scitula Rambur, 1833
- Euclidia mi (Clerck, 1759)
- Euclidia glyphica (Linnaeus, 1758)
- Euplagia quadripunctaria (Poda, 1761)
- Euproctis chrysorrhoea (Linnaeus, 1758)
- Euproctis similis (Fuessly, 1775)
- Grammodes bifasciata (Petagna, 1787)
- Grammodes stolida (Fabricius, 1775)
- Herminia flavicrinalis (Andreas, 1910)
- Herminia grisealis (Denis & Schiffermüller, 1775)
- Herminia tarsicrinalis (Knoch, 1782)
- Herminia tarsipennalis (Treitschke, 1835)
- Hypena crassalis (Fabricius, 1787)
- Hypena lividalis (Hübner, 1796)
- Hypena obesalis Treitschke, 1829
- Hypena obsitalis (Hübner, 1813)
- Hypena proboscidalis (Linnaeus, 1758)
- Hypena rostralis (Linnaeus, 1758)
- Hyphoraia dejeani (Godart, 1822)
- Hyphoraia testudinaria (Geoffroy in Fourcroy, 1785)
- Idia calvaria (Denis & Schiffermüller, 1775)
- Laelia coenosa (Hübner, 1808)
- Laspeyria flexula (Denis & Schiffermüller, 1775)
- Leucoma salicis (Linnaeus, 1758)
- Lithosia quadra (Linnaeus, 1758)
- Lygephila craccae (Denis & Schiffermüller, 1775)
- Lygephila fonti Yela & Calle, 1990
- Lygephila lusoria (Linnaeus, 1758)
- Lygephila pastinum (Treitschke, 1826)
- Lymantria atlantica (Rambur, 1837)
- Lymantria dispar (Linnaeus, 1758)
- Lymantria monacha (Linnaeus, 1758)
- Macrochilo cribrumalis (Hübner, 1793)
- Maurica breveti (Oberthur, 1882)
- Metachrostis dardouini (Boisduval, 1840)
- Metachrostis velox (Hübner, 1813)
- Miltochrista miniata (Forster, 1771)
- Minucia lunaris (Denis & Schiffermüller, 1775)
- Nodaria nodosalis (Herrich-Schäffer, 1851)
- Nudaria mundana (Linnaeus, 1761)
- Ocneria rubea (Denis & Schiffermüller, 1775)
- Ocnogyna baetica (Rambur, 1836)
- Ocnogyna zoraida (Graslin, 1837)
- Odice arcuinna (Hübner, 1790)
- Odice blandula (Rambur, 1858)
- Odice jucunda (Hübner, 1813)
- Odice pergrata (Rambur, 1858)
- Odice suava (Hübner, 1813)
- Ophiusa tirhaca (Cramer, 1773)
- Orgyia aurolimbata Guenée, 1835
- Orgyia dubia (Tauscher, 1806)
- Orgyia recens (Hübner, 1819)
- Orgyia splendida Rambur, 1842
- Orgyia trigotephras Boisduval, 1829
- Orgyia antiqua (Linnaeus, 1758)
- Paidia rica (Freyer, 1858)
- Pandesma robusta (Walker, 1858)
- Paracolax tristalis (Fabricius, 1794)
- Parascotia fuliginaria (Linnaeus, 1761)
- Parascotia lorai Agenjo, 1967
- Parascotia nisseni Turati, 1905
- Parasemia plantaginis (Linnaeus, 1758)
- Pechipogo plumigeralis Hübner, 1825
- Pechipogo simplicicornis (Zerny, 1935)
- Pechipogo strigilata (Linnaeus, 1758)
- Pelosia muscerda (Hufnagel, 1766)
- Pelosia obtusa (Herrich-Schäffer, 1852)
- Pelosia plumosa (Mabille, 1900)
- Phragmatobia fuliginosa (Linnaeus, 1758)
- Phragmatobia luctifera (Denis & Schiffermüller, 1775)
- Phytometra sanctiflorentis (Boisduval, 1834)
- Phytometra viridaria (Clerck, 1759)
- Polypogon tentacularia (Linnaeus, 1758)
- Raparna conicephala (Staudinger, 1870)
- Rhypagla lacernaria (Hübner, 1813)
- Rhyparia purpurata (Linnaeus, 1758)
- Rivula sericealis (Scopoli, 1763)
- Schrankia costaestrigalis (Stephens, 1834)
- Scoliopteryx libatrix (Linnaeus, 1758)
- Setina cantabrica de Freina & Witt, 1985
- Setina flavicans (Geyer, 1836)
- Spilosoma lubricipeda (Linnaeus, 1758)
- Spilosoma lutea (Hufnagel, 1766)
- Spilosoma urticae (Esper, 1789)
- Tathorhynchus exsiccata (Lederer, 1855)
- Thumatha senex (Hübner, 1808)
- Trisateles emortualis (Denis & Schiffermüller, 1775)
- Tyria jacobaeae (Linnaeus, 1758)
- Utetheisa pulchella (Linnaeus, 1758)
- Watsonarctia deserta (Bartel, 1902)
- Zanclognatha lunalis (Scopoli, 1763)
- Zanclognatha zelleralis (Wocke, 1850)
- Zebeeba falsalis (Herrich-Schäffer, 1839)
- Zethes insularis Rambur, 1833

== Eriocottidae ==
- Eriocottis andalusiella Rebel, 1901
- Eriocottis hispanica Zagulajev, 1988
- Eriocottis nicolaeella Gibeaux, 1983
- Eriocottis paradoxella (Staudinger, 1859)

== Eriocraniidae ==
- Dyseriocrania subpurpurella (Haworth, 1828)
- Eriocrania semipurpurella (Stephens, 1835)

== Euteliidae ==
- Eutelia adulatrix (Hübner, 1813)

== See also ==
- List of butterflies of the Iberian Peninsula

== Sources ==
- Fauna Europaea
