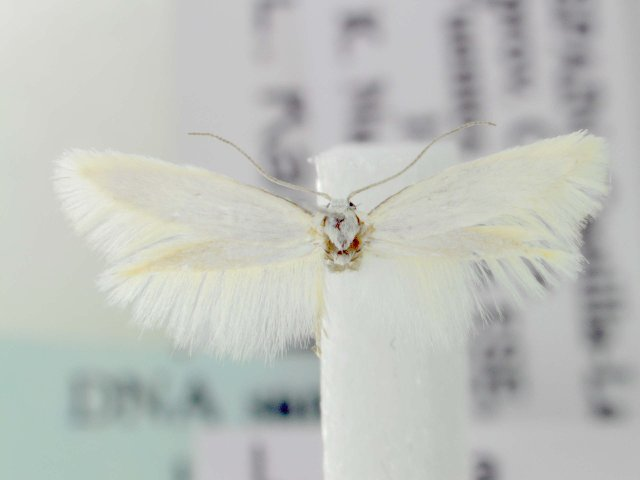

Scientific classification
- Kingdom: Animalia
- Phylum: Arthropoda
- Class: Insecta
- Order: Lepidoptera
- Family: Elachistidae
- Genus: Elachista
- Species: E. catalana

Binomial name
- Elachista catalana Parenti, 1978

Synonyms
- Elachista zuernbaueri Traugott-Olsen, 1990

= Elachista catalana =

Species of moth

Elachista catalana is a moth of the family Elachistidae. It is found in Morocco, Spain, France, Italy, San Marino and Croatia.

The larvae feed on Dactylis glomerata. They mine the leaves of their host plant.

== Taxonomy ==
Elachista modesta was previously treated as a synonym of Elachista catalana, but was recently reinstated as a valid species.
