= Metaxitagma =

Scientific classification
- Kingdom: Animalia
- Phylum: Arthropoda
- Clade: Pancrustacea
- Class: Insecta
- Order: Lepidoptera
- Family: Autostichidae
- Subfamily: Symmocinae
- Genus: Metaxitagma; Gozmány, 1985

Genus of moths

Metaxitagma is a moth genus in the family Autostichidae.

== Species ==
- Metaxitagma connivens Gozmány, 1985
- Metaxitagma mauricum Gozmány, 2008
- Metaxitagma monotona Gozmány, 2008
