= Coleophora diluta =

Scientific classification
- Kingdom: Animalia
- Phylum: Arthropoda
- Clade: Pancrustacea
- Class: Insecta
- Order: Lepidoptera
- Family: Coleophoridae
- Genus: Coleophora
- Species: C. diluta

Binomial name
- Coleophora diluta Baldizzone & v.d.Wolf, 1999

Species of moth

Coleophora diluta is a moth of the family Coleophoridae. It is found in Spain.
