= Coleophora feoleuca =

Scientific classification
- Kingdom: Animalia
- Phylum: Arthropoda
- Clade: Pancrustacea
- Class: Insecta
- Order: Lepidoptera
- Family: Coleophoridae
- Genus: Coleophora
- Species: C. feoleuca

Binomial name
- Coleophora feoleuca Baldizzone, 1989

Species of moth

Coleophora feoleuca is a moth of the family Coleophoridae. It is found in Spain.

The larvae feed on Salsola species and Suaeda altissima. They create a light to dark brown composite leaf case, made of two or three elements. The case is slender and 11–14 mm long. The mouth angle is about 45°.
