= Coleophora wolschrijni =

Scientific classification
- Kingdom: Animalia
- Phylum: Arthropoda
- Clade: Pancrustacea
- Class: Insecta
- Order: Lepidoptera
- Family: Coleophoridae
- Genus: Coleophora
- Species: C. wolschrijni

Binomial name
- Coleophora wolschrijni Baldizzone & v.d.Wolf, 2000

Species of moth

Coleophora wolschrijni is a moth of the family Coleophoridae. It is found in Spain.
