= Coleophora epijudaica =

Scientific classification
- Kingdom: Animalia
- Phylum: Arthropoda
- Class: Insecta
- Order: Lepidoptera
- Family: Coleophoridae
- Genus: Coleophora
- Species: C. epijudaica

Binomial name
- Coleophora epijudaica Amsel, 1935

Synonyms
- Coleophora pseudojudaica Amsel, 1935; Coleophora cretensis Baldizzone, 1983

Species of moth

Coleophora epijudaica is a moth of the family Coleophoridae. It is found in Spain, Crete and in the Palestinian Territories.
