= Coleophora changaica =

Scientific classification
- Kingdom: Animalia
- Phylum: Arthropoda
- Class: Insecta
- Order: Lepidoptera
- Family: Coleophoridae
- Genus: Coleophora
- Species: C. changaica

Binomial name
- Coleophora changaica Reznik, 1975

Synonyms
- Coleophora karadaghi Reznik, 1976

Species of moth

Coleophora changaica is a moth of the family Coleophoridae. It is found in Spain, Algeria, Ukraine, southern Russia, Mongolia, Jordan and China.

The larvae feed on the leaves of Artemisia taurica and Artemisia turanica.
