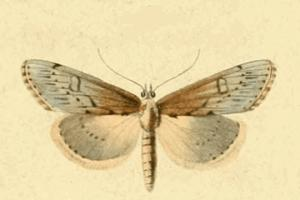

Scientific classification
- Domain: Eukaryota
- Kingdom: Animalia
- Phylum: Arthropoda
- Class: Insecta
- Order: Lepidoptera
- Family: Crambidae
- Genus: Evergestis
- Species: E. isatidalis

Binomial name
- Evergestis isatidalis (Duponchel, 1833)

Synonyms
- Scopula isatidalis Duponchel, 1833; Pionea conquisitalis Guenée, 1849

= Evergestis isatidalis =

Species of moth

Evergestis isatidalis is a species of moth in the family Crambidae. It is found in France, Spain, Portugal, Italy, Croatia, Greece, Turkey and North Africa, including Algeria.

The wingspan is 28–34 mm. Adults are on wing from December to January.

The larvae feed on Isatis tinctoria, Raphanus raphanistrum and Eruca vesicaria. Along the coast, larvae are found from February to March. Inland, they live from April to May.
