= Coleophora lebedella =

Scientific classification
- Kingdom: Animalia
- Phylum: Arthropoda
- Class: Insecta
- Order: Lepidoptera
- Family: Coleophoridae
- Genus: Coleophora
- Species: C. lebedella

Binomial name
- Coleophora lebedella Falkovitsh, 1982

Synonyms
- Casignetella lebedella

Species of moth

Coleophora lebedella is a moth of the family Coleophoridae. It is found in Spain, southern Russia, central Asia and Iran. It occurs in desert-steppe and desert biotopes.

Adults are on wing from the end of May to June.

The larvae feed on Atriplex tatarica, Atriplex glauca, Atriplex nitens and possibly Chenopodium species. They feed on the leaves of their host plant.
