= Coleophora infolliculella =

Scientific classification
- Kingdom: Animalia
- Phylum: Arthropoda
- Class: Insecta
- Order: Lepidoptera
- Family: Coleophoridae
- Genus: Coleophora
- Species: C. infolliculella

Binomial name
- Coleophora infolliculella Chretien, 1915

Synonyms
- Coleophora espunaella Glaser, 1978

Species of moth

Coleophora infolliculella is a moth of the family Coleophoridae. It is found in Algeria, Tunisia, and Spain.

The larvae feed on the fruits and bast of Hammada articulata.
