= Coleophora turbatella =

Scientific classification
- Kingdom: Animalia
- Phylum: Arthropoda
- Class: Insecta
- Order: Lepidoptera
- Family: Coleophoridae
- Genus: Coleophora
- Species: C. turbatella

Binomial name
- Coleophora turbatella Toll, 1944

Species of moth

Coleophora turbatella is a moth of the family Coleophoridae. It is found in Spain.

The wingspan is about 10 mm.

The larvae feed on Carex brevifolia.
