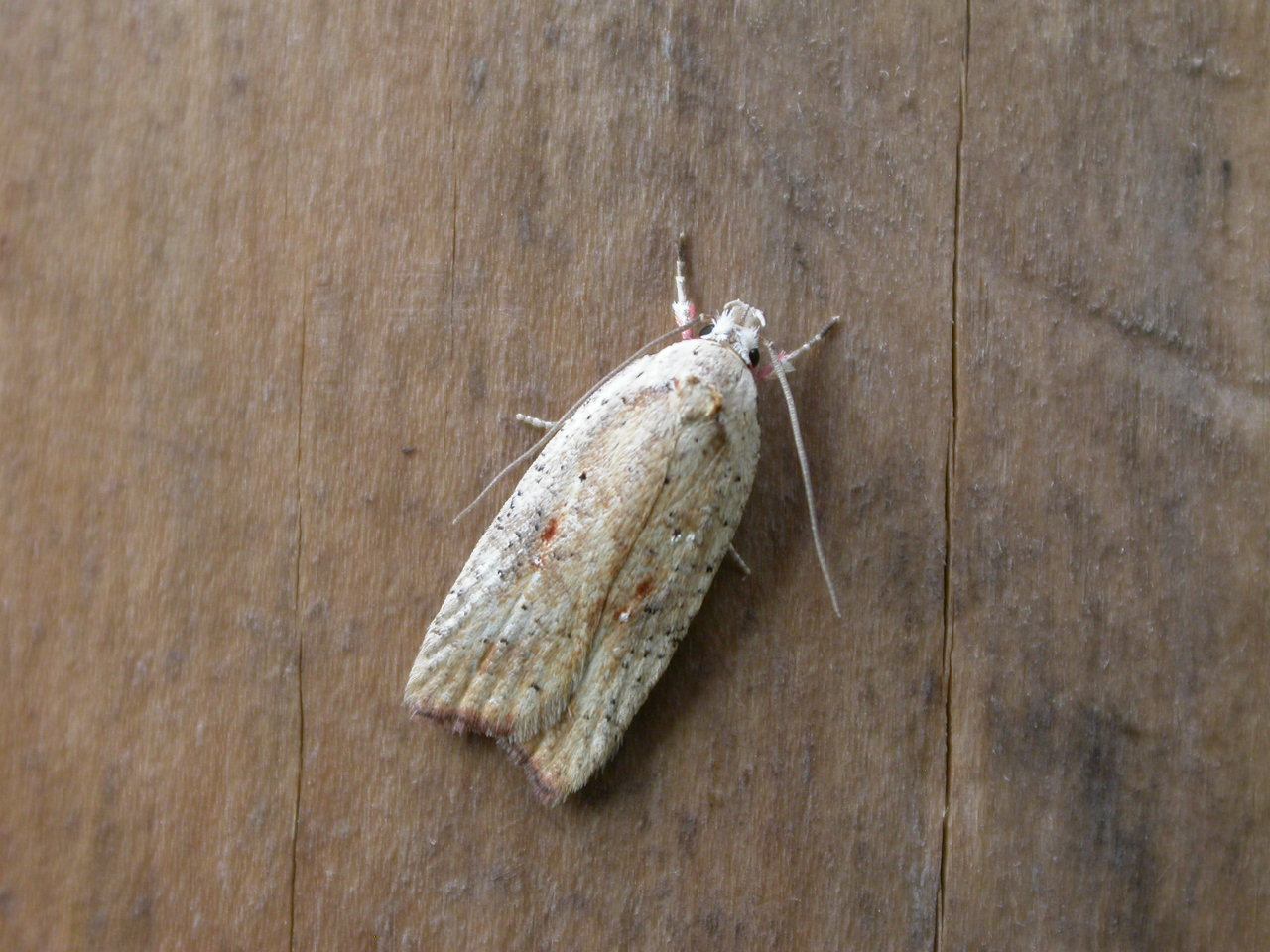
- Adult in Hellerup, Denmark
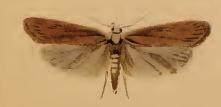
- Illustration from Stainton's Natural History of the Tineina

Scientific classification
- Kingdom: Animalia
- Phylum: Arthropoda
- Clade: Pancrustacea
- Class: Insecta
- Order: Lepidoptera
- Family: Depressariidae
- Genus: Agonopterix
- Species: A. nervosa

Binomial name
- Agonopterix nervosa (Haworth, 1811)

Synonyms
- Numerous, see text

= Agonopterix nervosa =

Gorse tip moth

Species of moth

The gorse tip moth (Agonopterix nervosa) is a smallish moth species of the family Depressariidae.

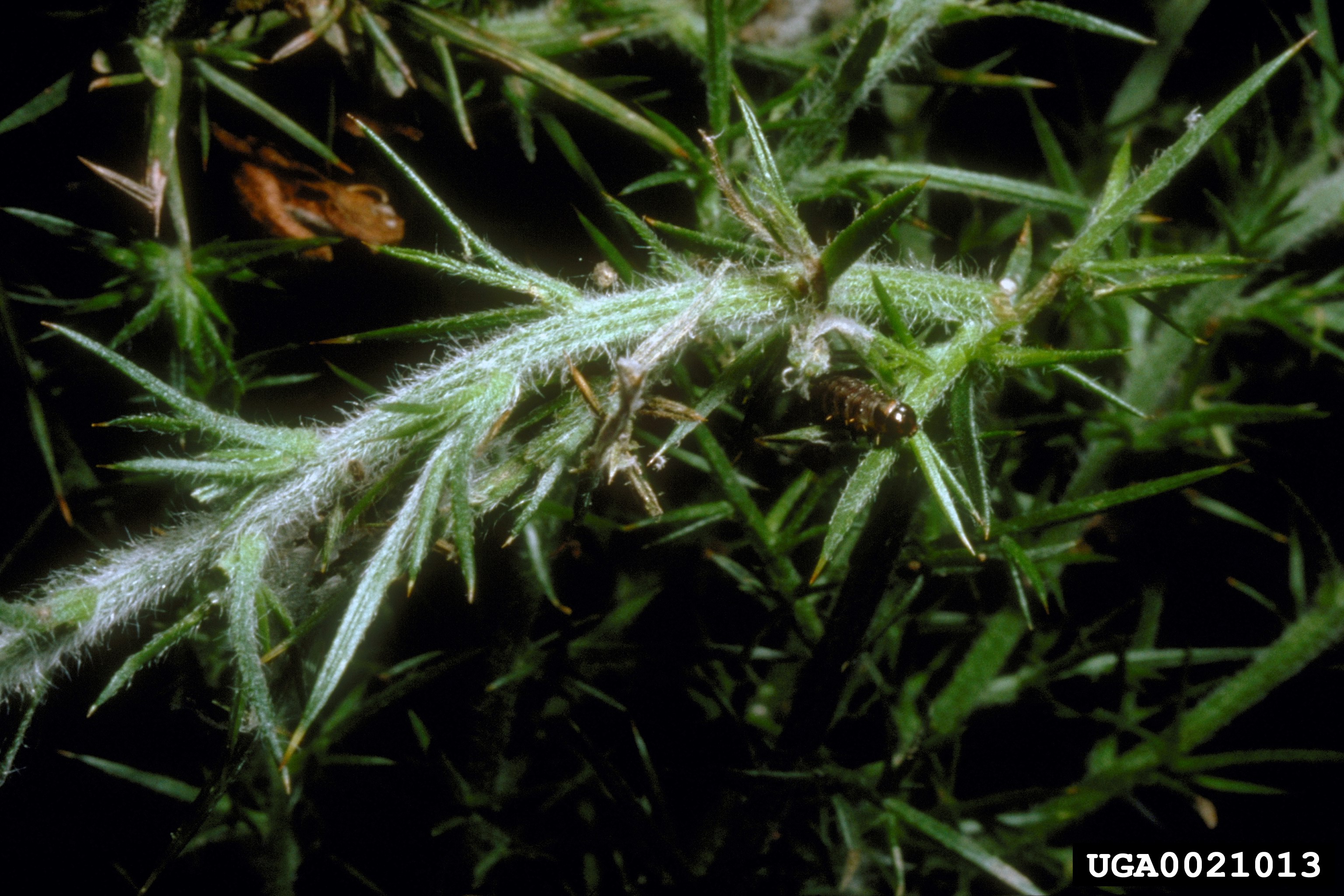
Caterpillar (right of center) emerging from foodplant

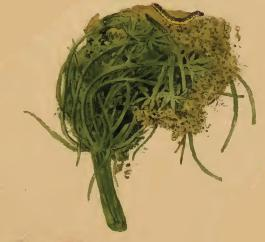
An inflorescence of Oenanthe crocata with flowers drawn together by larva

It is found in Europe and North America.

The wingspan is 16–22 mm. Terminal joint of palpi with two blackish bands. Forewings are light brown, somewhat whitish-sprinkled, sometimes slightly reddish-tinged; numerous dark fuscous dashes; two indicating discal stigmata, between which is sometimes a line of pale scales; an obscure pale very acutely angulated fascia at 3/4. Hindwings fuscous-whitish, more fuscous posteriorly; 5 connate with stalk of 3 and 4.The larva is dark bluish -grey; lateral line orange-yellow; spots black, white-circled; head black; plate of 2 black, bisected, anterior edge whitish.

Adults fly from July to September depending on the location.

The caterpillars feed on brooms, namely of the genera Cytisus, Genista, Laburnum (golden chains) and Ulex (gorses).

== Synonyms ==
Obsolete scientific names of the gorse tip moth are:

- Agonopteryx blackmori Busck, 1922
- Agonopterix boicella (Freyer, 1835)
- Depressaria costosa Haworth, 1811
- Tinea depunctella Hübner, [1813])
- Depressaria dryadoxena Meyrick, 1920
- Depressaria costosa ab. venosata Kautz, 1930
- Depressaria nervosa Haworth, 1811 (In older (19th-century) sources, this name is often misapplied to Depressaria daucella)
- Agonopterix rubricella Millière, 1876
- Depressaria obscurana Weber, 1945
- Tortrix spartiana Hübner, [1813]
