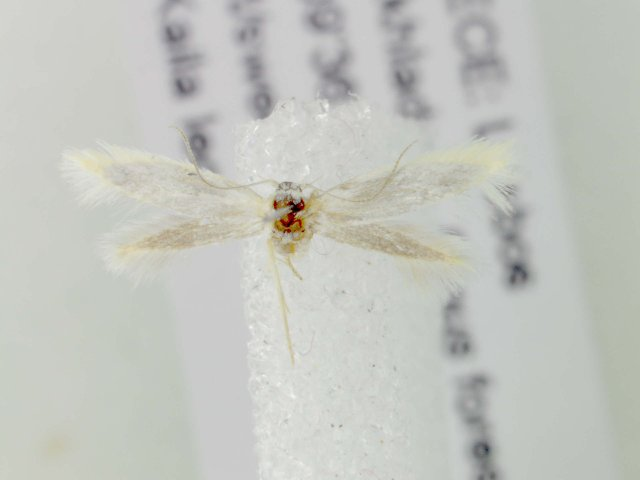

Scientific classification
- Domain: Eukaryota
- Kingdom: Animalia
- Phylum: Arthropoda
- Class: Insecta
- Order: Lepidoptera
- Family: Elachistidae
- Genus: Elachista
- Species: E. modesta

Binomial name
- Elachista modesta Parenti, 1978

= Elachista modesta =

Species of moth

Elachista modesta is a moth of the family Elachistidae. It is found in Greece (Lesbos and Rhodes) and Turkey.

The wingspan is 8–8.2 millimetres (0.31–0.32 in) for males and 8–9.6 mm for females.
