= Coleophora fuliginosa =

Scientific classification
- Kingdom: Animalia
- Phylum: Arthropoda
- Clade: Pancrustacea
- Class: Insecta
- Order: Lepidoptera
- Family: Coleophoridae
- Genus: Coleophora
- Species: C. fuliginosa

Binomial name
- Coleophora fuliginosa Baldizzone, 1998

Species of moth

Coleophora fuliginosa is a moth of the family Coleophoridae. It is found in Spain.
