= Coleophora ventadelsolella =

Scientific classification
- Kingdom: Animalia
- Phylum: Arthropoda
- Class: Insecta
- Order: Lepidoptera
- Family: Coleophoridae
- Genus: Coleophora
- Species: C. ventadelsolella

Binomial name
- Coleophora ventadelsolella Glaser, 1981

Species of moth

Coleophora ventadelsolella is a moth of the family Coleophoridae. It is found in Spain.

The wingspan is about 10 mm.

The larvae feed on Artemisia alba. They create a case of 6–8 mm long and a mouth angle of 60-70°.
