= Ethmia lepidella =

Scientific classification
- Domain: Eukaryota
- Kingdom: Animalia
- Phylum: Arthropoda
- Class: Insecta
- Order: Lepidoptera
- Family: Depressariidae
- Genus: Ethmia
- Species: E. lepidella

Binomial name
- Ethmia lepidella (Chretien, 1907)

Synonyms
- Psecadia lepidella Chrétien, 1907; Ethmia niveella Caradja, 1920; Psecadia lactistrigella Turati & Krüger, 1936; Ethmia euphraticella Amsel, 1954; Psecadia lacteistrigella Turati & Krüger, 1936

Species of moth

Ethmia lepidella is a moth in the family Depressariidae. It is found in Algeria, Tunisia, Libya, the Palestinian Territories, the United Arab Emirates, Turkey and Spain.

The larvae have been recorded feeding on Echium humile and Anchusa hispida.
