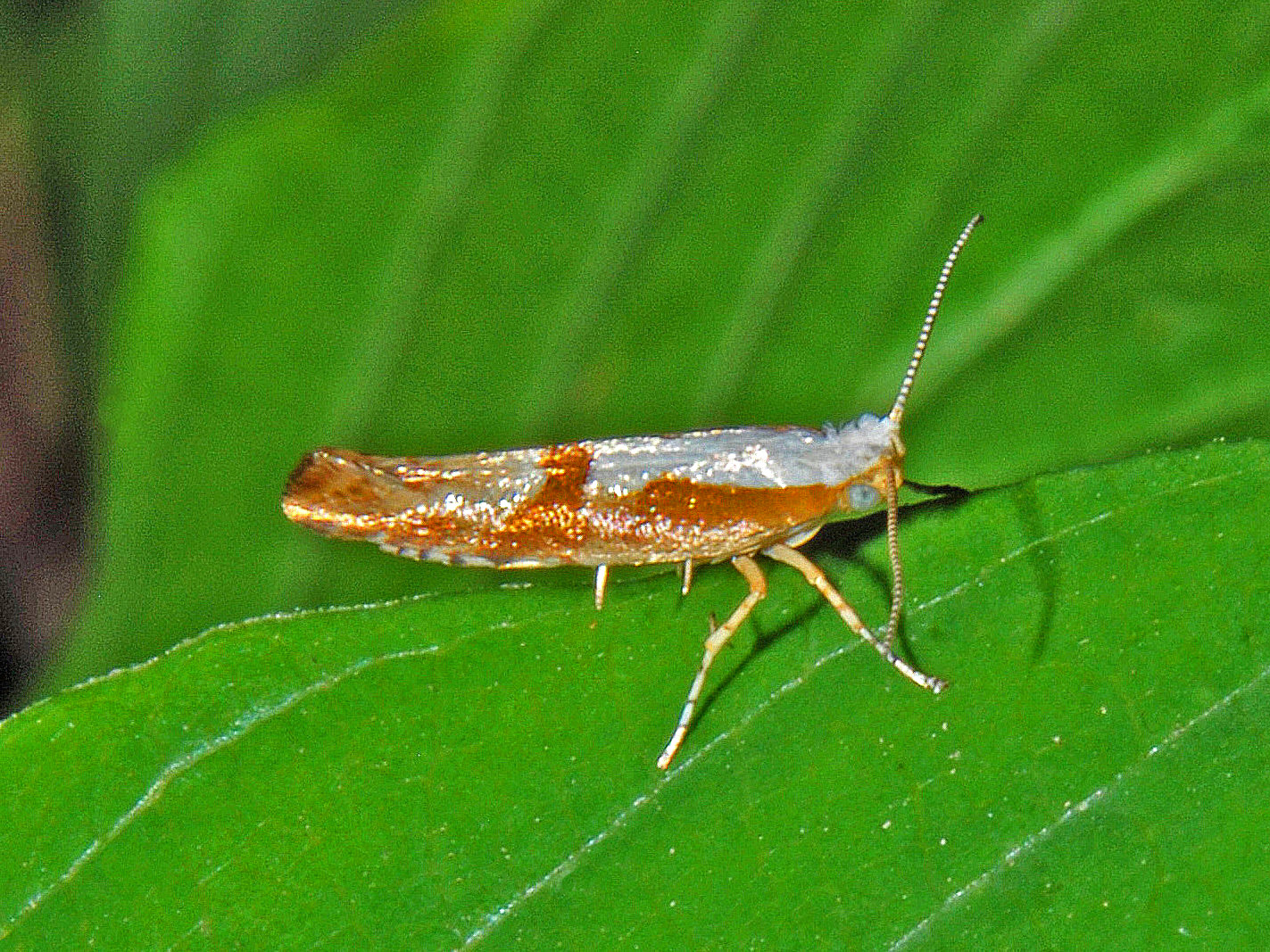
- Argyresthia pruniella. Side view
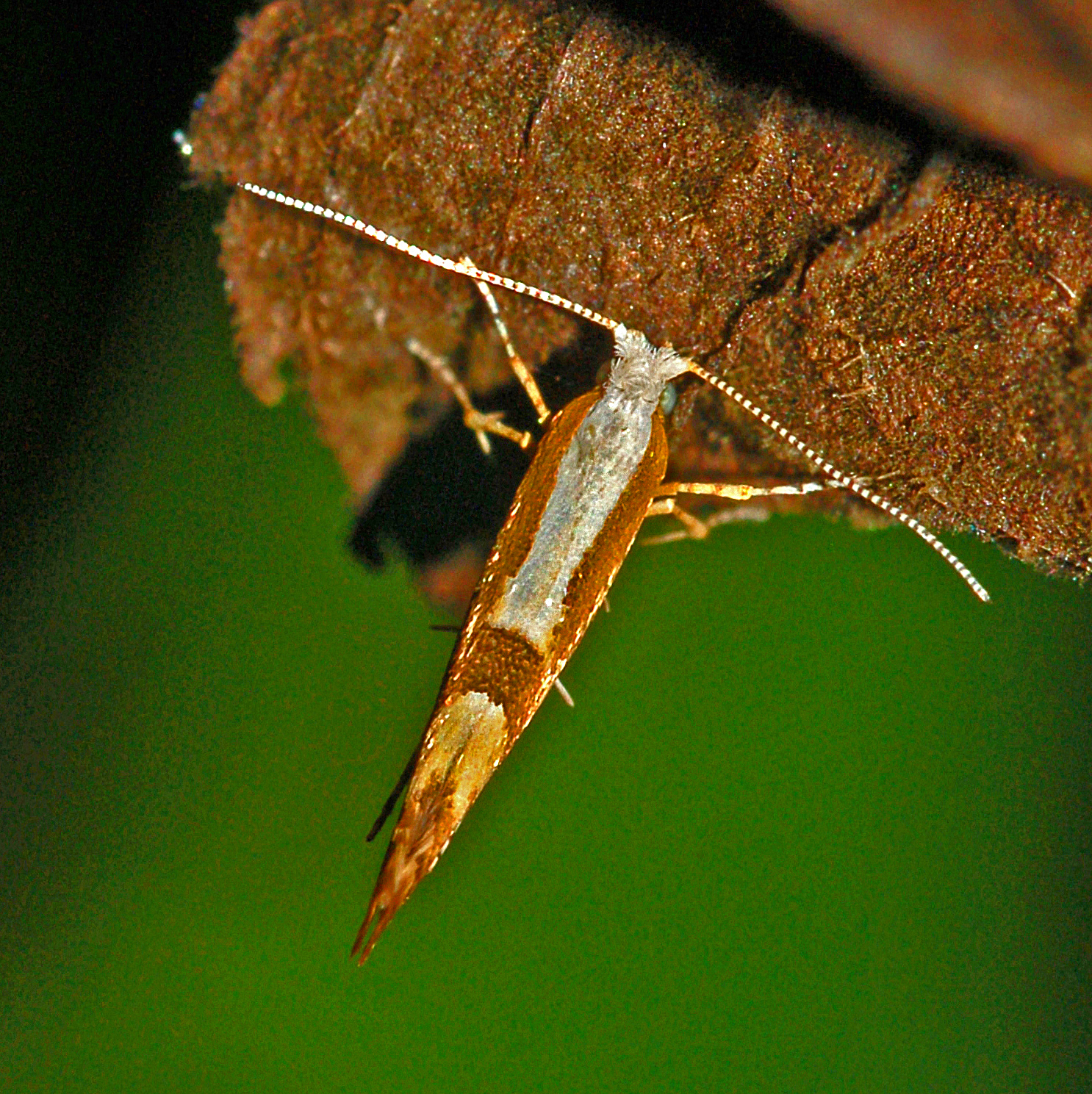
- Dorsal view

Scientific classification
- Kingdom: Animalia
- Phylum: Arthropoda
- Clade: Pancrustacea
- Class: Insecta
- Order: Lepidoptera
- Family: Argyresthiidae
- Genus: Argyresthia
- Species: A. pruniella

Binomial name
- Argyresthia pruniella Clerck, 1759

Synonyms
- Phalaena pruniella Clerck, 1759; Tinea ephippella Fabricius, 1775

= Argyresthia pruniella =

Cherry blossom tineid

Species of moth

Argyresthia pruniella, the cherry fruit moth or cherry blossom tineid, is a moth from the family Yponomeutidae, the ermine moths.

== Description ==
Argyresthia pruniella has a wingspan of 10–13 millimetres (0.39–0.51 in). Forewings are reddish-brown with a white dorsal stripe and a dark transversal brown stripe in the middle. Antennae are white with brown bands. Along the forewings lower edge there is a row of white spots. Hindwings are brownish and very narrow, with very long fringes. The caterpillars are pale green with a brown head.

== Biology ==
Larvae are oligophagous. Main host plants are apple, apricot, cherry, peach, plum, pear and hazel. The larva lives in the shoots. The flight time ranges from early July to late August. These moths are attracted to light. They are considered a pest of the cultures of said plants.

== Distribution ==
This species can be found in most of Europe, in Asia Minor and in North America.

== Gallery ==
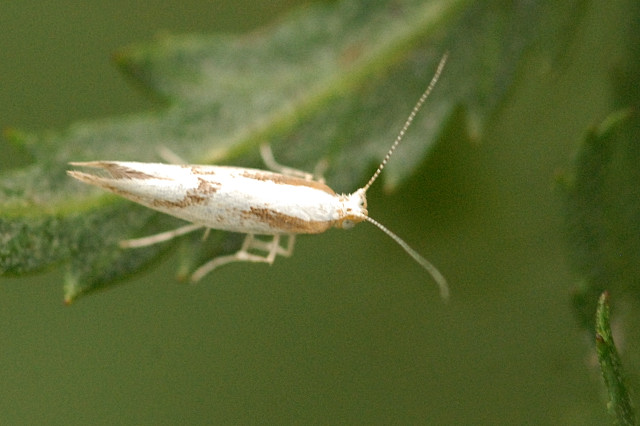
Argyresthia pruniella

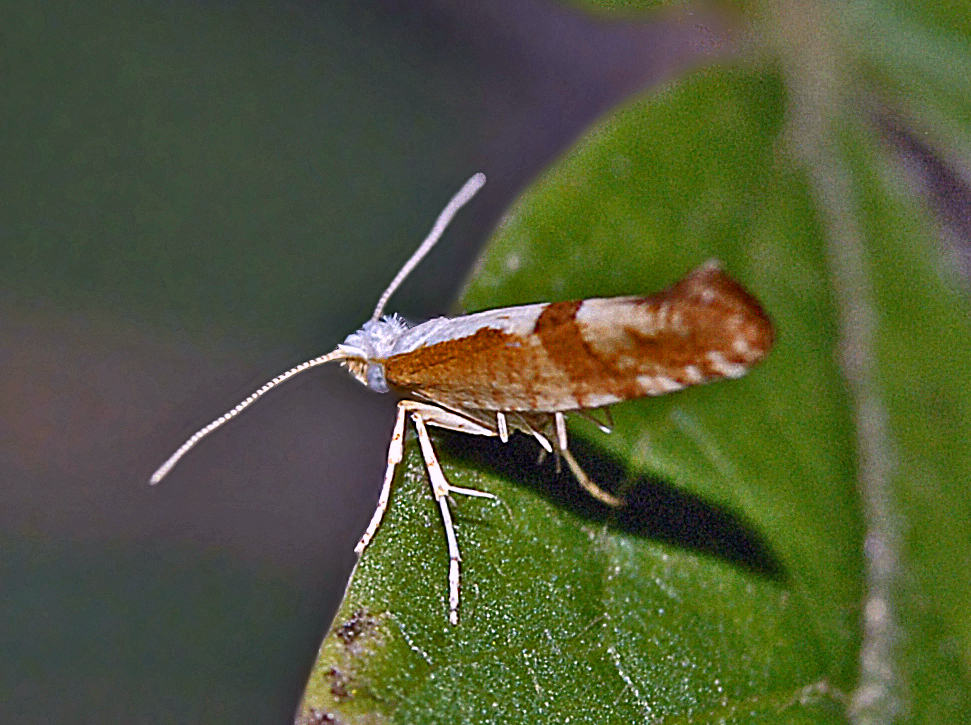
Side view

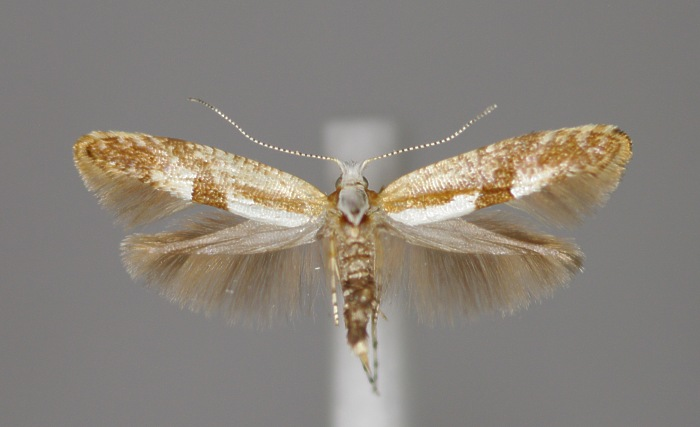
Mounted specimen
