= Coleophora afrohispana =

Scientific classification
- Kingdom: Animalia
- Phylum: Arthropoda
- Clade: Pancrustacea
- Class: Insecta
- Order: Lepidoptera
- Family: Coleophoridae
- Genus: Coleophora
- Species: C. afrohispana

Binomial name
- Coleophora afrohispana Baldizzone, 1982

Species of moth

Coleophora ardesicola is a moth of the family Coleophoridae that can be found in such European countries as Portugal and Spain, and into North Africa.
