= Elachista ibericella =

Scientific classification
- Kingdom: Animalia
- Phylum: Arthropoda
- Class: Insecta
- Order: Lepidoptera
- Family: Elachistidae
- Genus: Elachista
- Species: E. ibericella

Binomial name
- Elachista ibericella Traugott-Olsen, 1995

Species of moth

Elachista ibericella is a moth of the family Elachistidae. It is found in Spain.
