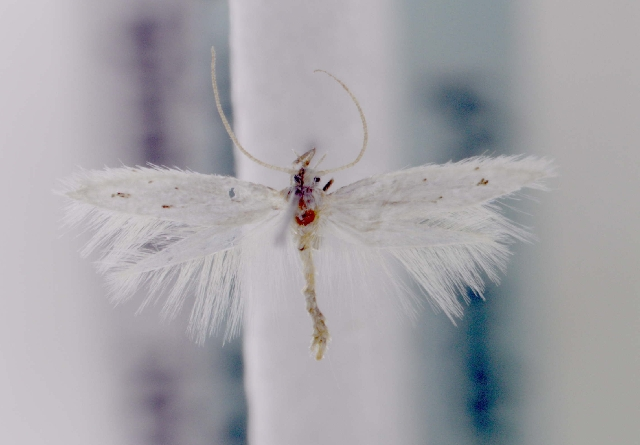

Scientific classification
- Kingdom: Animalia
- Phylum: Arthropoda
- Class: Insecta
- Order: Lepidoptera
- Family: Elachistidae
- Genus: Elachista
- Species: E. berndtiella

Binomial name
- Elachista berndtiella Traugott-Olsen, 1985

= Elachista berndtiella =

Species of moth

Elachista berndtiella is a moth of the family Elachistidae. It is found in Spain and Germany.
