= Coleophora turolella =

Scientific classification
- Kingdom: Animalia
- Phylum: Arthropoda
- Class: Insecta
- Order: Lepidoptera
- Family: Coleophoridae
- Genus: Coleophora
- Species: C. turolella

Binomial name
- Coleophora turolella Zerny, 1927

Synonyms
- Coleophora escalerai Toll, 1960

Species of moth

Coleophora turolella is a moth of the family Coleophoridae. It is found in Spain.

The larvae feed on Carex brizoides.
