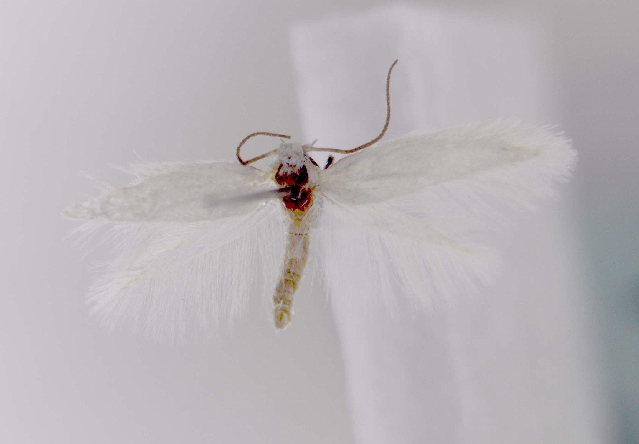

Scientific classification
- Kingdom: Animalia
- Phylum: Arthropoda
- Class: Insecta
- Order: Lepidoptera
- Family: Elachistidae
- Genus: Elachista
- Species: E. anitella

Binomial name
- Elachista anitella Traugott-Olsen, 1985

= Elachista anitella =

Species of moth

Elachista anitella is a moth of the family Elachistidae. It is found in Spain, Ukraine and Russia.
