= Coleophora arefactella =

Scientific classification
- Kingdom: Animalia
- Phylum: Arthropoda
- Class: Insecta
- Order: Lepidoptera
- Family: Coleophoridae
- Genus: Coleophora
- Species: C. arefactella

Binomial name
- Coleophora arefactella Staudinger, 1859

Species of moth

Coleophora arefactella is a moth of the family Coleophoridae. It is found in Spain.
