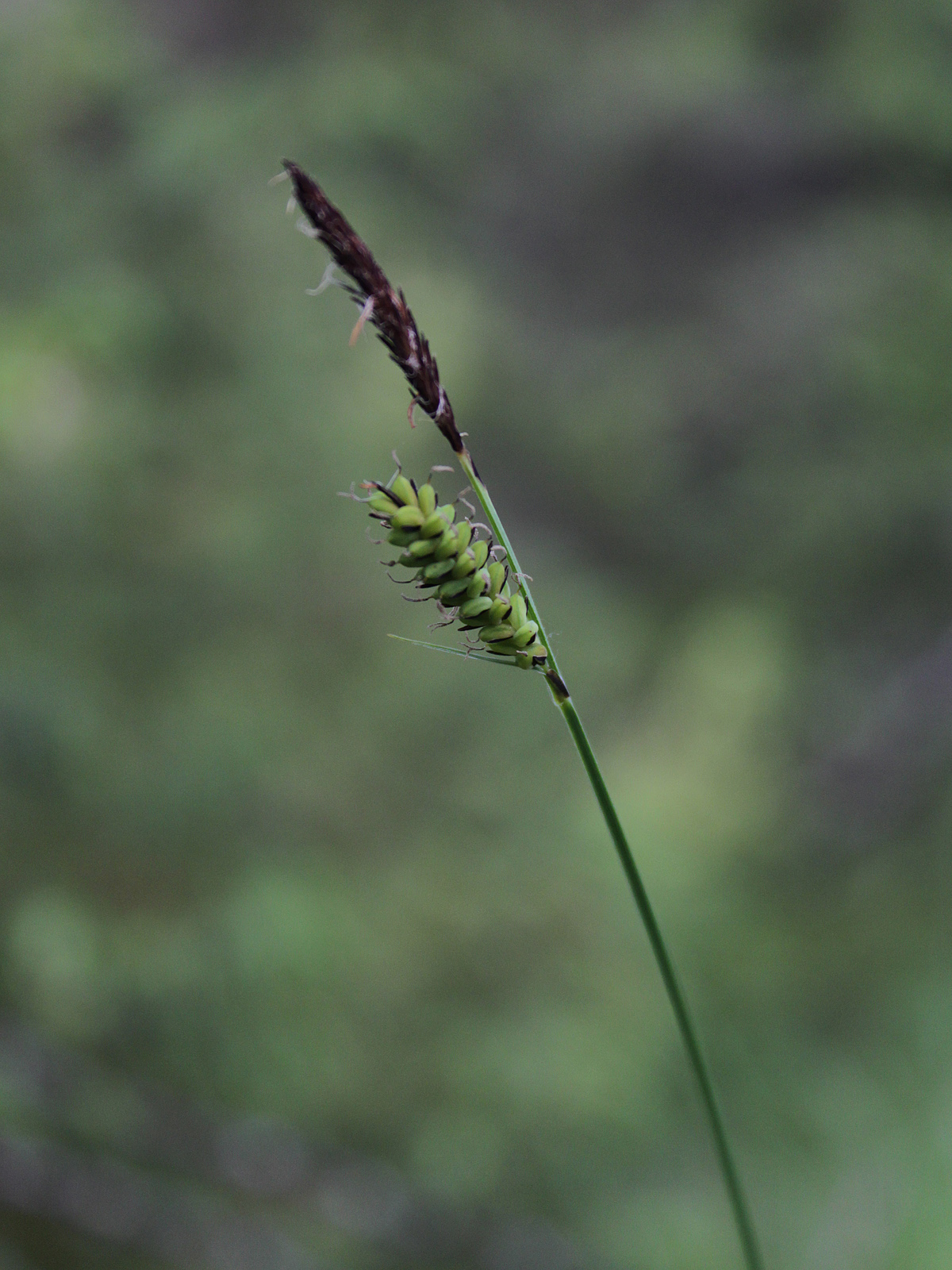
- Inflorescence
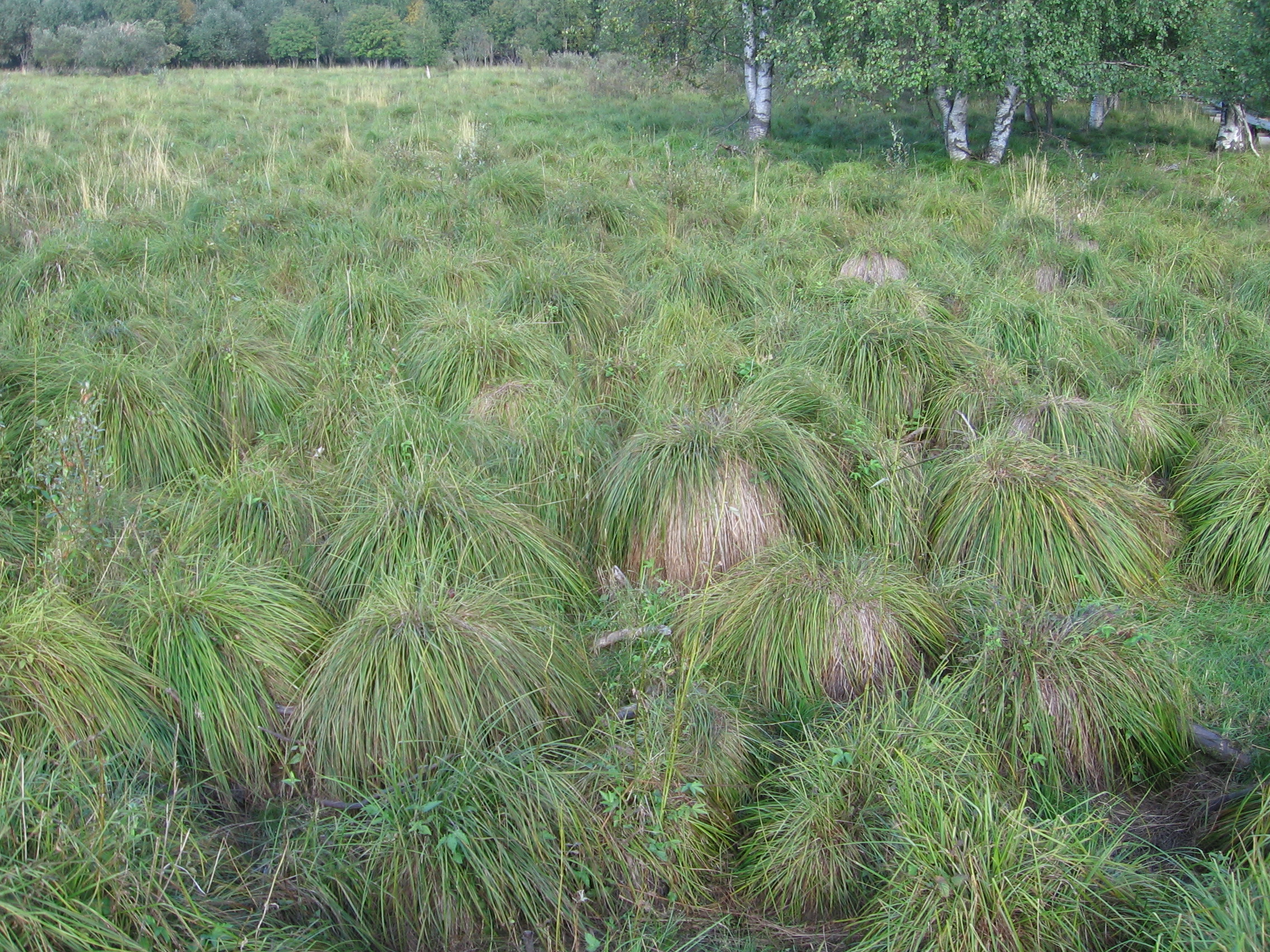
- Tufted (caespitose) growth form

Scientific classification
- Kingdom: Plantae
- Clade: Tracheophytes
- Clade: Angiosperms
- Clade: Monocots
- Clade: Commelinids
- Order: Poales
- Family: Cyperaceae
- Genus: Carex
- Species: C. cespitosa

Binomial name
- Carex cespitosa L.

= Carex cespitosa =

Species of grass-like plant

Carex cespitosa (tuft sedge, hassock grass) is a species of perennial sedge of the genus Carex which can be found growing in tufts (caespitose), as the Latin specific epithet cespitosa suggests. The name is synonymous with Carex cespitosa f. retorta.

The species is able to hybridise with the common sedge (Carex nigra) to produce a plant 20–50 centimetres (8–20 in) tall, flowering from May to June. The species can be found in all of Scandinavia, ranging from common to rare, and central parts of Europe, becoming rare to the west and towards the Mediterranean, and including isolated locations in Great Britain and the Iberian Peninsula.

The species is often found in a mosaic with other Carex, but can become almost entirely dominant. It grows in very moist soil.
