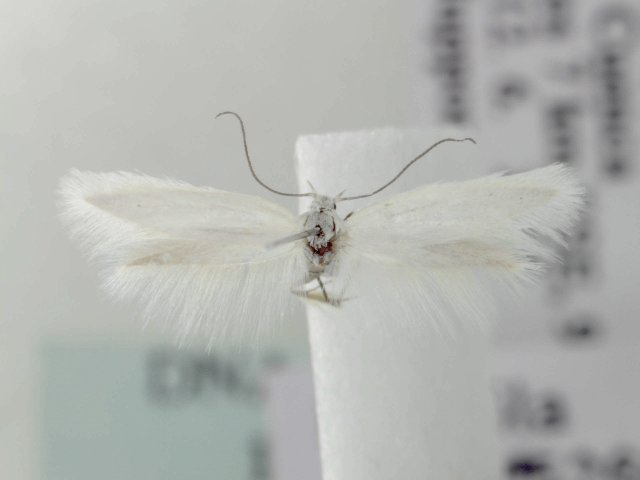

Scientific classification
- Kingdom: Animalia
- Phylum: Arthropoda
- Class: Insecta
- Order: Lepidoptera
- Family: Elachistidae
- Genus: Elachista
- Species: E. bazaensis

Binomial name
- Elachista bazaensis Traugott-Olsen, 1990

= Elachista bazaensis =

Species of moth

Elachista bazaensis is a moth of the family Elachistidae that is found in Spain.
