= Coleophora horatioella =

Scientific classification
- Kingdom: Animalia
- Phylum: Arthropoda
- Class: Insecta
- Order: Lepidoptera
- Family: Coleophoridae
- Genus: Coleophora
- Species: C. horatioella

Binomial name
- Coleophora horatioella (Agenjo, 1952)

Synonyms
- Eupista horatioella Agenjo, 1952

Species of moth

Coleophora horatioella is a moth of the family Coleophoridae. It is found in Spain.
