= Coleophora luteochrella =

Scientific classification
- Kingdom: Animalia
- Phylum: Arthropoda
- Clade: Pancrustacea
- Class: Insecta
- Order: Lepidoptera
- Family: Coleophoridae
- Genus: Coleophora
- Species: C. luteochrella

Binomial name
- Coleophora luteochrella Baldizzone & Tabell, 2009

Species of moth

Coleophora luteochrella is a moth of the family Coleophoridae. It is found in southern Spain and southern, eastern and northern Portugal.

The wingspan is 10.5–12 millimetres (0.41–0.47 in).
