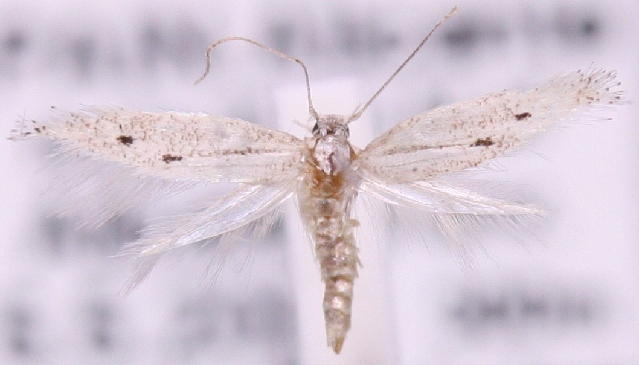

Scientific classification
- Kingdom: Animalia
- Phylum: Arthropoda
- Clade: Pancrustacea
- Class: Insecta
- Order: Lepidoptera
- Family: Elachistidae
- Genus: Elachista
- Species: E. alicanta

Binomial name
- Elachista alicanta Kaila, 2005

= Elachista alicanta =

Species of moth

Elachista alicanta is a moth of the family Elachistidae. It is found in southern Spain. The habitat consists of xerothermic steppe slopes on calcareous soil.

The length of the forewings is 5–5.5 mm (0.20–0.22 in) for males and 4–4.5 mm (0.16–0.18 in) for females.
