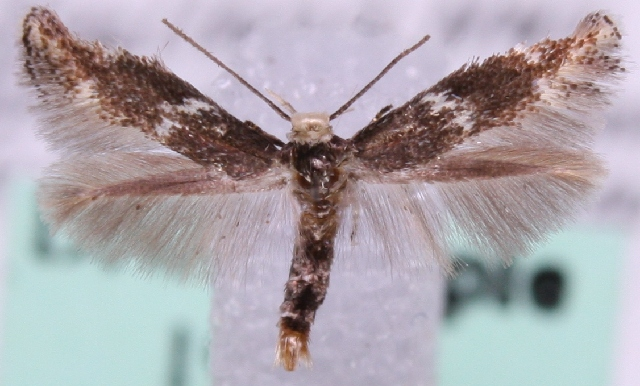

Scientific classification
- Kingdom: Animalia
- Phylum: Arthropoda
- Class: Insecta
- Order: Lepidoptera
- Family: Elachistidae
- Genus: Elachista
- Species: E. stabilella

Binomial name
- Elachista stabilella Stainton, 1858

Synonyms
- Biselachista stabilella Traugott-Olsen & Nielsen, 1977; Cosmiotes stabilella Clemens, 1860

= Elachista stabilella =

Species of moth

Elachista stabilella is a moth of the family Elachistidae found in Asia and Europe.

== Description ==
The wingspan is 7–8 millimetres (0.28–0.31 in). Adults are on wing from April to May and again from June to July.

The larvae feed on bent (Agrostis species), common wild oat (Avena fatua), tor-gras (Brachypodium pinnatum), false-brome (Brachypodium sylvaticum), reedgrass (Calamagrostis species), tufted hairgrass (Deschampsia cespitosa), tall fescue (Festuca arundinacea), wood millet (Milium effusum) and Poa badensis. They mine the leaves of their host plant. Larvae can be found from February to the end of May and again from June to July.

== Distribution ==
It is found from Scandinavia to Switzerland and from Great Britain to Romania. It is also present on the Iberian Peninsula and Russia (Transbaikalia and western Siberia).
