= Coleophora agilis =

Scientific classification
- Kingdom: Animalia
- Phylum: Arthropoda
- Clade: Pancrustacea
- Class: Insecta
- Order: Lepidoptera
- Family: Coleophoridae
- Genus: Coleophora
- Species: C. agilis

Binomial name
- Coleophora agilis Baldizzone, 1998

Species of moth

Coleophora agilis is a moth of the family Coleophoridae. It is found on the Iberian Peninsula.
