= Coleophora kahaourella =

Scientific classification
- Kingdom: Animalia
- Phylum: Arthropoda
- Class: Insecta
- Order: Lepidoptera
- Family: Coleophoridae
- Genus: Coleophora
- Species: C. kahaourella

Binomial name
- Coleophora kahaourella Toll, 1956

Synonyms
- Coleophora glabricella Toll, 1960

Species of moth

Coleophora kahaourella is a moth of the family Coleophoridae. It is found in Spain, Tunisia and Libya.
