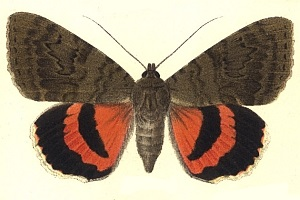

Scientific classification
- Kingdom: Animalia
- Phylum: Arthropoda
- Class: Insecta
- Order: Lepidoptera
- Superfamily: Noctuoidea
- Family: Erebidae
- Genus: Catocala
- Species: C. oberthueri

Binomial name
- Catocala oberthueri Austaut, 1879

Synonyms
- Catocala elocata var. oberthüri Austaut, 1879; Catocala oberthuri; Catocala gitana Mabille, 1885

= Catocala oberthueri =

Species of moth

Catocala oberthueri is a species of moth in the family Erebidae first described by Jules Léon Austaut in 1879. It is found in Spain, Tunisia, Algeria and Morocco.

The wingspan is about 70 mm. Adults are on wing from June to July.
