= Coleophora plicipunctella =

Scientific classification
- Kingdom: Animalia
- Phylum: Arthropoda
- Class: Insecta
- Order: Lepidoptera
- Family: Coleophoridae
- Genus: Coleophora
- Species: C. plicipunctella

Binomial name
- Coleophora plicipunctella Chretien, 1915

Synonyms
- Carpochena halostachyos Falkovitsh, 1992

Species of moth

Coleophora plicipunctella is a moth of the family Coleophoridae. It is found in Spain and China.
