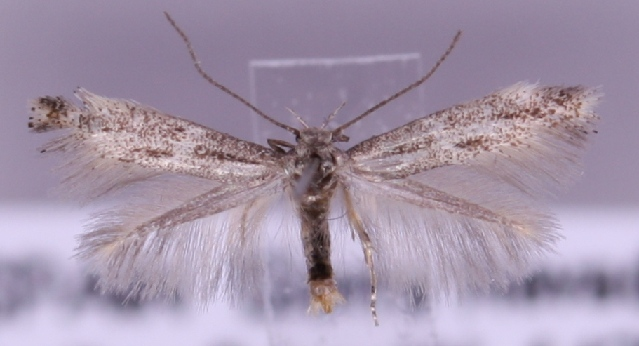

Scientific classification
- Domain: Eukaryota
- Kingdom: Animalia
- Phylum: Arthropoda
- Class: Insecta
- Order: Lepidoptera
- Family: Elachistidae
- Genus: Elachista
- Species: E. minuta

Binomial name
- Elachista minuta (Parenti, 2003)

Synonyms
- Cosmiotes minuta Parenti, 2003

= Elachista minuta =

Species of moth

Elachista minuta is a moth of the family Elachistidae that can be found in Spain and on Crete.
