= Coleophora pterosparti =

Scientific classification
- Kingdom: Animalia
- Phylum: Arthropoda
- Class: Insecta
- Order: Lepidoptera
- Family: Coleophoridae
- Genus: Coleophora
- Species: C. pterosparti

Binomial name
- Coleophora pterosparti Mendes, 1910

Synonyms
- Coleophora depauperella Toll, 1960

Species of moth

Coleophora pterosparti is a moth of the family Coleophoridae. It is found on the Iberian Peninsula.

The larvae feed on Chamaespartium tridentatum. They create a spatulate leaf case, made from the mined apical part of a phyllodium. Larvae can be found from January to April.
