= Udea zernyi =

Scientific classification
- Domain: Eukaryota
- Kingdom: Animalia
- Phylum: Arthropoda
- Class: Insecta
- Order: Lepidoptera
- Family: Crambidae
- Genus: Udea
- Species: U. zernyi

Binomial name
- Udea zernyi (Klima, 1939)

Synonyms
- Pionea zernyi Klima in Zerny, 1940

Species of moth

Udea zernyi is a species of moth in the family Crambidae. It was first described by Klima in 1939 and it is found in Spain.

== Taxonomy ==
Pionea zernyi is the replacement name for Pionea melanostictalis (Zerny, 1927) which is preoccupied by Udea melanostictalis, described by George Hampson in 1916.
