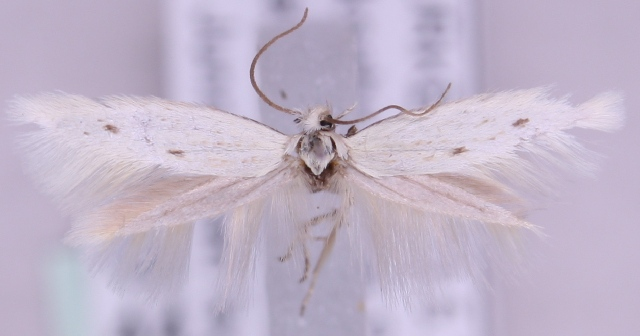

Scientific classification
- Domain: Eukaryota
- Kingdom: Animalia
- Phylum: Arthropoda
- Class: Insecta
- Order: Lepidoptera
- Family: Elachistidae
- Genus: Elachista
- Species: E. deceptricula

Binomial name
- Elachista deceptricula Staudinger, 1880

= Elachista deceptricula =

Species of moth

Elachista deceptricula is a moth of the family Elachistidae. It is found in Spain, Ukraine, Greece and Turkey.
