= Coleophora beticella =

Scientific classification
- Kingdom: Animalia
- Phylum: Arthropoda
- Clade: Pancrustacea
- Class: Insecta
- Order: Lepidoptera
- Family: Coleophoridae
- Genus: Coleophora
- Species: C. beticella

Binomial name
- Coleophora beticella Baldizzone, 1987

Species of moth

Coleophora beticella is a moth of the family Coleophoridae that is found in Spain.
