= Coleophora bazae =

Scientific classification
- Kingdom: Animalia
- Phylum: Arthropoda
- Class: Insecta
- Order: Lepidoptera
- Family: Coleophoridae
- Genus: Coleophora
- Species: C. bazae

Binomial name
- Coleophora bazae Glaser, 1978

Synonyms
- Coleophora totanae Baldizzone, 1985

Species of moth

Coleophora bazae is a moth of the family Coleophoridae that is endemic to Spain.

The larvae feed on Atriplex glauca. They feed on the generative organs of their host plant.
