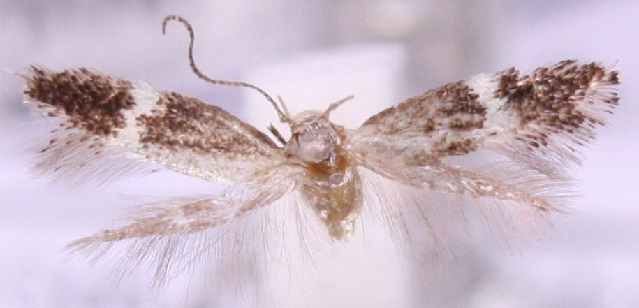

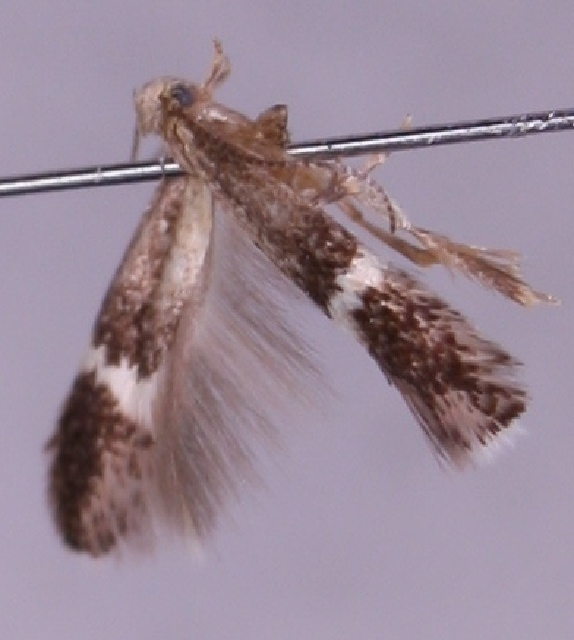

Scientific classification
- Kingdom: Animalia
- Phylum: Arthropoda
- Class: Insecta
- Order: Lepidoptera
- Family: Elachistidae
- Genus: Elachista
- Species: E. istanella

Binomial name
- Elachista istanella Nielsen & Traugott-Olsen, 1987

= Elachista istanella =

Species of moth

Elachista istanella is a moth of the family Elachistidae. It is found in Spain.
