= Elachista madridensis =

Scientific classification
- Kingdom: Animalia
- Phylum: Arthropoda
- Class: Insecta
- Order: Lepidoptera
- Family: Elachistidae
- Genus: Elachista
- Species: E. madridensis

Binomial name
- Elachista madridensis Traugott-Olsen, 1992

Species of moth

Elachista madridensis is a moth of the family Elachistidae that is endemic to Spain.
