= Coleophora vermiculatella =

Scientific classification
- Kingdom: Animalia
- Phylum: Arthropoda
- Class: Insecta
- Order: Lepidoptera
- Family: Coleophoridae
- Genus: Coleophora
- Species: C. vermiculatella

Binomial name
- Coleophora vermiculatella Glaser, 1975

Species of moth

Coleophora vermiculatella is a moth of the family Coleophoridae. It is found in southern Spain.

The wingspan is 9.5-11.5 mm.

The larvae feed on Caroxylon vermiculatum.
