= Coleophora strutiella =

Scientific classification
- Kingdom: Animalia
- Phylum: Arthropoda
- Class: Insecta
- Order: Lepidoptera
- Family: Coleophoridae
- Genus: Coleophora
- Species: C. strutiella

Binomial name
- Coleophora strutiella Glaser, 1975

Species of moth

Coleophora strutiella is a moth of the family Coleophoridae. It is found in Spain.

The larvae feed on Gypsophila struthium. They create a trivalved, light yellow brown, tubular silken case of 6.5–8 mm. The mouth angle is 35°. Full-grown cases are found at the end of May and early June.
