= Elachista cirrhoplica =

Scientific classification
- Kingdom: Animalia
- Phylum: Arthropoda
- Class: Insecta
- Order: Lepidoptera
- Family: Elachistidae
- Genus: Elachista
- Species: E. cirrhoplica

Binomial name
- Elachista cirrhoplica Kaila, 2012

Species of moth

Elachista cirrhoplica is a moth of the family Elachistidae first described by Lauri Kaila in 2012. It is found in eastern Spain. The habitat consists of montane areas at altitudes between 1,600 and 2,300 meters.

The wingspan is 8.8–9.5 mm.
