= Coleophora agnatella =

Scientific classification
- Kingdom: Animalia
- Phylum: Arthropoda
- Class: Insecta
- Order: Lepidoptera
- Family: Coleophoridae
- Genus: Coleophora
- Species: C. agnatella

Binomial name
- Coleophora agnatella Toll, 1960

Species of moth

Coleophora agnatella is a moth of the family Coleophoridae. It is found in Spain, Libya and Tunisia.
