= Coleophora inusitatella =

- Pupal case

Scientific classification
- Kingdom: Animalia
- Phylum: Arthropoda
- Clade: Pancrustacea
- Class: Insecta
- Order: Lepidoptera
- Family: Coleophoridae
- Genus: Coleophora
- Species: C. inusitatella

Binomial name
- Coleophora inusitatella Caradja, 1920

Synonyms
- Coleophora spenceri Toll, 1960

Species of moth

Coleophora inusitatella is a species of moth in the family Coleophoridae. It is found in Algeria, Spain and Portugal.

The larvae feed on the leaves of Phlomis herba-venti and possibly Phlomis russeliana.
