= Metaxitagma monotona =

Scientific classification
- Kingdom: Animalia
- Phylum: Arthropoda
- Clade: Pancrustacea
- Class: Insecta
- Order: Lepidoptera
- Family: Autostichidae
- Genus: Metaxitagma
- Species: M. monotona

Binomial name
- Metaxitagma monotona Gozmány, 2008

Species of moth

Metaxitagma monotona is a moth of the family Autostichidae. It is found in Spain.
