= Coleophora tanitella =

Scientific classification
- Kingdom: Animalia
- Phylum: Arthropoda
- Clade: Pancrustacea
- Class: Insecta
- Order: Lepidoptera
- Family: Coleophoridae
- Genus: Coleophora
- Species: C. tanitella

Binomial name
- Coleophora tanitella Baldizzone, 1982

Species of moth

Coleophora tanitella is a moth of the family Coleophoridae. It is found in Portugal, Spain and Tunisia. It is reddish-brown in color.

The larvae feed on Juncus acutus. They feed on the generative organs of their host plant.
