= Coleophora tridentifera =

Scientific classification
- Kingdom: Animalia
- Phylum: Arthropoda
- Clade: Pancrustacea
- Class: Insecta
- Order: Lepidoptera
- Family: Coleophoridae
- Genus: Coleophora
- Species: C. tridentifera

Binomial name
- Coleophora tridentifera Baldizzone, 1985

Species of moth

Coleophora tridentifera is a moth of the family Coleophoridae. It is found in Spain.

The larvae feed on Carex bellardii.
