= Coleophora perplexella =

Scientific classification
- Kingdom: Animalia
- Phylum: Arthropoda
- Class: Insecta
- Order: Lepidoptera
- Family: Coleophoridae
- Genus: Coleophora
- Species: C. perplexella

Binomial name
- Coleophora perplexella Toll, 1960

Species of moth

Coleophora perplexella is a moth of the family Coleophoridae. It is found in Spain and Portugal.
