= Coleophora agenjoi =

Scientific classification
- Kingdom: Animalia
- Phylum: Arthropoda
- Class: Insecta
- Order: Lepidoptera
- Family: Coleophoridae
- Genus: Coleophora
- Species: C. agenjoi

Binomial name
- Coleophora agenjoi Toll, 1960

Species of moth

Coleophora agenjoi is a moth of the family Coleophoridae that is endemic to Spain.
