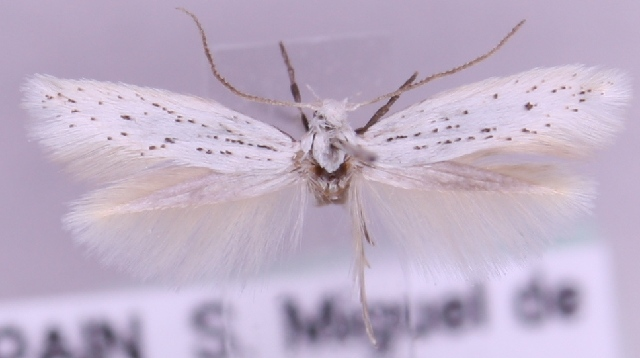

Scientific classification
- Kingdom: Animalia
- Phylum: Arthropoda
- Class: Insecta
- Order: Lepidoptera
- Family: Elachistidae
- Genus: Elachista
- Species: E. oukaimedenensis

Binomial name
- Elachista oukaimedenensis Traugott-Olsen, 1988

= Elachista oukaimedenensis =

Species of moth

Elachista oukaimedenensis is a moth in the family Elachistidae. It was described by Traugott-Olsen in 1988.

== Distribution ==
It is found in Spain and Morocco.
