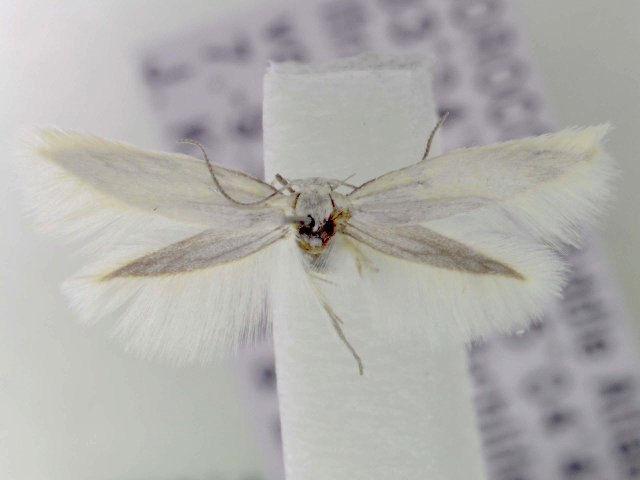

Scientific classification
- Kingdom: Animalia
- Phylum: Arthropoda
- Class: Insecta
- Order: Lepidoptera
- Family: Elachistidae
- Genus: Elachista
- Species: E. vulcana

Binomial name
- Elachista vulcana Kaila, 2011

= Elachista vulcana =

Species of moth

Elachista vulcana is a moth of the family Elachistidae. It is found in Spain and Morocco.

The wingspan is 12–12.5 mm for males and 14 mm for females.
