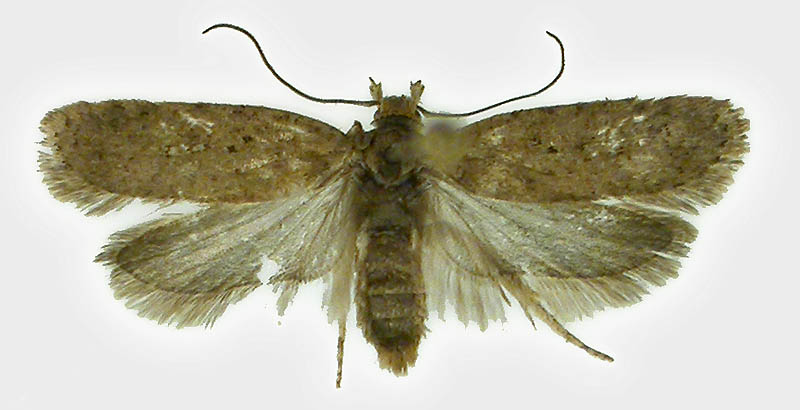

Scientific classification
- Kingdom: Animalia
- Phylum: Arthropoda
- Clade: Pancrustacea
- Class: Insecta
- Order: Lepidoptera
- Family: Depressariidae
- Genus: Agonopterix
- Species: A. capreolella

Binomial name
- Agonopterix capreolella (Zeller, 1839)

Synonyms
- Depressaria capreolella Zeller, 1839; Depressaria caprella Stainton, 1849

= Agonopterix capreolella =

Species of moth

Agonopterix capreolella is a moth of the family Depressariidae. It is found in most of Europe, the eastern Palearctic realm, and the Near East.

The wingspan is 15–19 mm. The forewings are light fuscous; base pale; first discal stigma black, preceded by a similar dot obliquely above it, second white, obscurely dark-edged, preceded by a similar dot; dark fuscous terminal dots. Hindwings are whitish-fuscous, darker terminally. The larva is green; dorsal and subdorsal lines darker; head and plate of 2 black.

Adults are on wing from August to May.

The larvae feed on Pimpinella saxifraga, Daucus carota, and Sium latifolium.
