= Coleophora guadicensis =

Scientific classification
- Kingdom: Animalia
- Phylum: Arthropoda
- Clade: Pancrustacea
- Class: Insecta
- Order: Lepidoptera
- Family: Coleophoridae
- Genus: Coleophora
- Species: C. guadicensis

Binomial name
- Coleophora guadicensis Baldizzone, 1989

Species of moth

Coleophora guadicensis is a moth of the family Coleophoridae. It is found in Spain.

The larvae feed on Halimione portulacoides. They feed on the generative organs of their host plant.
