= Coleophora ortneri =

Scientific classification
- Kingdom: Animalia
- Phylum: Arthropoda
- Class: Insecta
- Order: Lepidoptera
- Family: Coleophoridae
- Genus: Coleophora
- Species: C. ortneri

Binomial name
- Coleophora ortneri Glaser, 1981

Species of moth

Coleophora ortneri is a moth of the family Coleophoridae. It is found in southern Spain.

The wingspan is 14–15 mm.

The larvae feed on Atriplex glauca. They create a light brown spatulate leaf case of 8–9 mm long with a mouth angle of about 55°. Full-grown larvae can be found in the second half of May.
