= Coleophora ciliataephaga =

Scientific classification
- Kingdom: Animalia
- Phylum: Arthropoda
- Class: Insecta
- Order: Lepidoptera
- Family: Coleophoridae
- Genus: Coleophora
- Species: C. ciliataephaga

Binomial name
- Coleophora ciliataephaga Glaser, 1978

Species of moth

Coleophora ciliataephaga is a moth of the family Coleophoridae. It is found in Spain.

The larvae feed on Maireana ciliata. Cases can be found from early May to mid-June.
