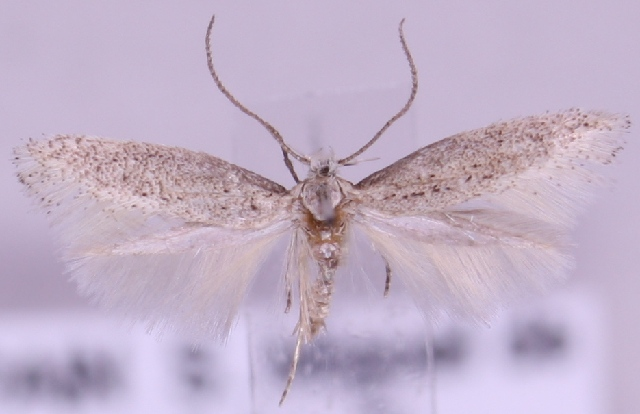

Scientific classification
- Domain: Eukaryota
- Kingdom: Animalia
- Phylum: Arthropoda
- Class: Insecta
- Order: Lepidoptera
- Family: Elachistidae
- Genus: Elachista
- Species: E. fuscibasella

Binomial name
- Elachista fuscibasella Chretien, 1915

= Elachista fuscibasella =

Species of moth

Elachista fuscibasella is a moth of the family Elachistidae. It is found in Spain and Portugal.

The wingspan is about 7.5 millimetres (0.30 in).
