= Coleophora festivella =

Scientific classification
- Kingdom: Animalia
- Phylum: Arthropoda
- Class: Insecta
- Order: Lepidoptera
- Family: Coleophoridae
- Genus: Coleophora
- Species: C. festivella

Binomial name
- Coleophora festivella Toll, 1952

Species of moth

Coleophora festivella is a moth of the family Coleophoridae. It is found in Algeria and southern Spain.

The larvae feed on Lotus species. They create a lobe case.
