= Pyrausta pellicalis =

Scientific classification
- Domain: Eukaryota
- Kingdom: Animalia
- Phylum: Arthropoda
- Class: Insecta
- Order: Lepidoptera
- Family: Crambidae
- Genus: Pyrausta
- Species: P. pellicalis

Binomial name
- Pyrausta pellicalis (Staudinger, 1871)

Synonyms
- Botys pellicalis Staudinger, 1871

Species of moth

Pyrausta pellicalis is a species of moth in the family Crambidae. It is found in Spain and North Africa, including Algeria.
