= Coleophora monteiroi =

Scientific classification
- Kingdom: Animalia
- Phylum: Arthropoda
- Clade: Pancrustacea
- Class: Insecta
- Order: Lepidoptera
- Family: Coleophoridae
- Genus: Coleophora
- Species: C. monteiroi

Binomial name
- Coleophora monteiroi Toll, 1961

Species of moth

Coleophora monteiroi is a moth of the family Coleophoridae. It is found in Portugal.
