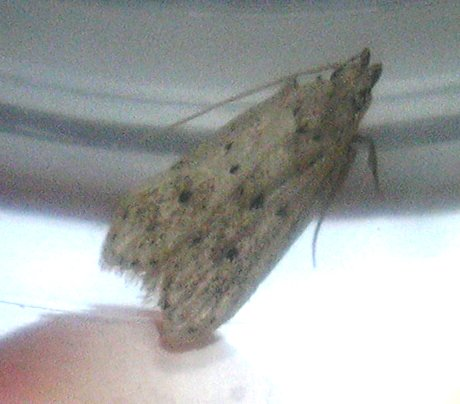
- Autosticha gelechid moth (Autosticha pelodes)

Scientific classification
- Kingdom: Animalia
- Phylum: Arthropoda
- Clade: Pancrustacea
- Class: Insecta
- Order: Lepidoptera
- Family: Autostichidae
- Subfamily: Autostichinae; Le Marchand, 1947

Type species
- Automola pelodes Meyrick, 1883

Genera
- Several, see text

= Autostichinae =

Subfamily of moths

The Autostichinae are a subfamily of moths in the superfamily Gelechioidea. Like their relatives therein, their exact relationships are not yet very well resolved. The present lineage was often included in the concealer moth family (Oecophoridae), but alternatively it is united with the Symmocidae sensu stricto (and often also the Holcopogonidae and/or certain genera otherwise considered twirler moths, e.g. Deoclona and Syringopais) to form an expanded family Autostichidae (in the past also referred to as family Symmocidae).

== Selected genera ==
Genera in this subfamily are:

- Anaptilora Meyrick, 1904
- Autosticha Meyrick, 1886 (including Epicoenia, Semnolocha)
- Demiophila Meyrick, 1906
- Deroxena Meyrick, 1913
- Diophila Meyrick, 1937
- Encrasima Meyrick, 1916
- Galagete B.Landry, 2002
- Heliangara Meyrick, 1906
- Ischnodoris Meyrick, 1911
- Lasiodictis Meyrick, 1912
- Nephantis Meyrick, 1905
- Pachnistis Meyrick, 1907
- Parallactis Meyrick, 1925
- Procometis Meyrick, 1890
- Protobathra Meyrick, 1916
- Ptochoryctis Meyrick, 1894
- Pudahuelia Urra, 2013
- Sipsa Diakonoff, 1955
- Stereosticha Meyrick, 1913
- Stochastica Meyrick, 1938
- Stoeberhinus – potato moth
- Trichloma Lower, 1902

Also placed here by some authors is Syndesmica, which is otherwise assigned to subfamily Dichomeridinae of the twirler moths (Gelechiidae). The same was true for Anaptilora, which is mostly included here.
