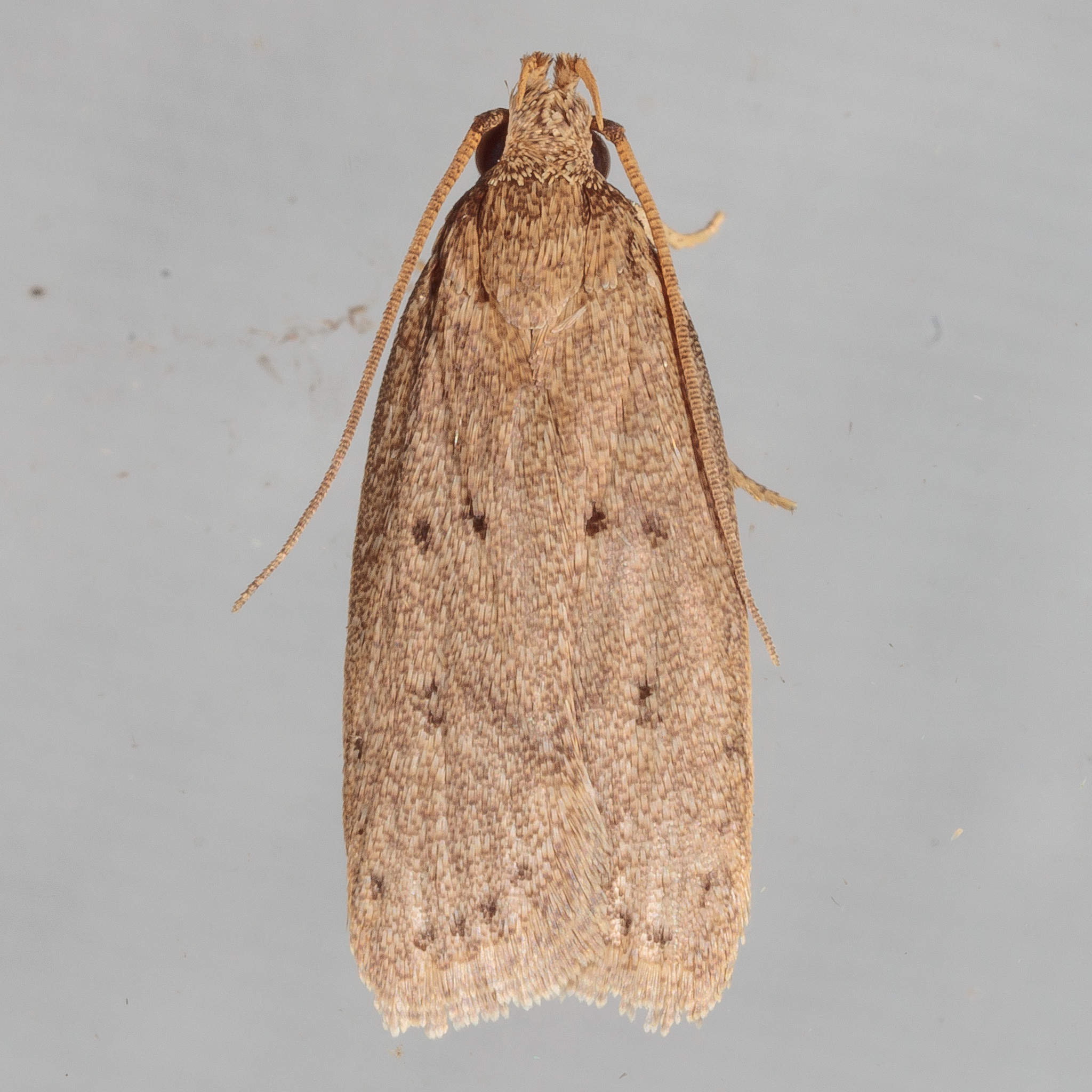

Scientific classification
- Kingdom: Animalia
- Phylum: Arthropoda
- Clade: Pancrustacea
- Class: Insecta
- Order: Lepidoptera
- Family: Autostichidae
- Genus: Autosticha
- Species: A. kyotensis

Binomial name
- Autosticha kyotensis (Matsumura, 1931)

Synonyms
- Depressaria kyotensis Matsumura, 1931; Brachmia kyotensis; Brachmia deodora Clarke, 1962

= Autosticha kyotensis =

Species of moth

Autosticha kyotensis, the Kyoto moth, is a moth in the family Autostichidae. It was described by Shōnen Matsumura in 1931. It is found in Japan on the island of Honshu. It is an introduced species in the United States, where it has been recorded from Alabama, Florida, Louisiana, Mississippi, North Carolina, Tennessee and Texas.

The wingspan is 15–19 mm. Adults look similar to Autosticha lushanensis.

The larvae feed on Cedrus deodara and Prunus mume.
