= A. calceata =

A. calceata may refer to:

- Aa calceata, species of orchid in the genus Aa
- Autosticha calceata, moth in the family Autostichidae
- Argyra calceata, species of flies in the family Dolichopodidae
- Allopiophila calceata, species of small flies in the family Piophilidae
