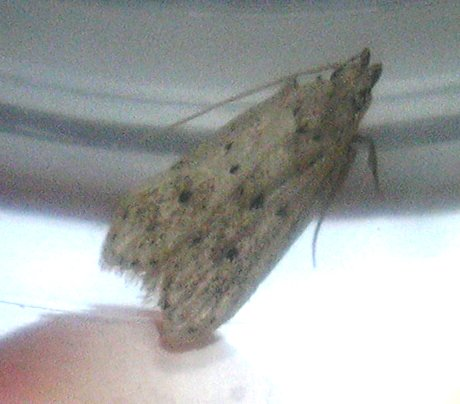
- Autosticha gelechid moth (Autosticha pelodes)

Scientific classification
- Kingdom: Animalia
- Phylum: Arthropoda
- Clade: Pancrustacea
- Class: Insecta
- Order: Lepidoptera
- Family: Autostichidae
- Subfamily: Autostichinae
- Genus: Autosticha; Meyrick, 1886

Type species
- Automola pelodes Meyrick, 1883

Synonyms
- Automola Meyrick, 1883 (non Loew, 1873: preoccupied); Prosomura Turner, 1919; Epicharma Durrant in Walsingham & Durrant, 1897*Epicoenia Meyrick, 1906; Semnolocha Meyrick, 1936

= Autosticha =

Genus of moths

Autosticha is a genus of gelechioid moths. It belongs to the subfamily Autostichinae, which is either placed in the concealer moth family (Oecophoridae), or in an expanded Autostichidae. It is the type genus of its subfamily (and the Autostichidae). Originally, this genus was named Automola, but this name properly refers to a fly genus in family Richardiidae.

Typically, these moths have the second and third forewing vein emerging from a common stalk. The labial palps are characteristically tapering from the second segment onwards and end in a pointed tip.

Several originally independent genera are now included here, and while most of them are probably not even valid as subgenera, some species included in Autosticha have been historically assigned to entirely different Gelechioidea lineages, such as the long-horned moths (Lecithoceridae) or the Xyloryctidae.

== Species ==
Species of Autosticha are:

- Autosticha academica Meyrick, 1922
- Autosticha acharacta Meyrick, 1918
- Autosticha affixella (Walker, 1864)
- Autosticha ansata Meyrick, 1931
- Autosticha aspasta Meyrick, 1908
- Autosticha arcivalvaris S.X.Wang, 2004
- Autosticha aureolata Meyrick, 1908
- Autosticha authaema (Meyrick, 1906)
- Autosticha auxodelta Meyrick, 1916
- Autosticha bacilliformis S.X.Wang, 2004
- Autosticha banauscopa (Meyrick, 1929)
- Autosticha bilobella Park & Wu, 2003
- Autosticha binaria Meyrick, 1908
- Autosticha calceata Meyrick, 1908
- Autosticha chernetis (Meyrick, 1906)
- Autosticha chishuiensis S.X.Wang, 2004
- Autosticha chlorodelta (Meyrick, 1906)
- Autosticha cipingensis S.X.Wang, 2004
- Autosticha complexivalvula S.X.Wang, 2004
- Autosticha conciliata Meyrick, 1918
- Autosticha conjugipunctata S.X.Wang, 2004
- Autosticha consimilis Park & Wu, 2003
- Autosticha crocothicta Meyrick, 1916
- Autosticha cuspidata Park & Wu, 2003
- Autosticha dayuensis Park & Wu, 2003
- Autosticha deductella (Walker, 1864)
- Autosticha demetrias Meyrick, 1908
- Autosticha demias Meyrick, 1886
- Autosticha demotica Meyrick, 1908
- Autosticha dianeura Meyrick, 1939
- Autosticha dimochla Meyrick, 1935
- Autosticha emmetra Meyrick, 1921
- Autosticha encycota Meyrick, 1922
- Autosticha enervata Meyrick, 1929
- Autosticha euryterma Meyrick, 1920
- Autosticha exemplaris Meyrick, 1916
- Autosticha fallaciosa S.X.Wang, 2004
- Autosticha flavescens Meyrick, 1916
- Autosticha flavida S.X.Wang, 2004
- Autosticha guangdongensis Park & Wu, 2003
- Autosticha guttulata Meyrick, 1925
- Autosticha hainanica Park & Wu, 2003
- Autosticha heteromalla S.X.Wang, 2004
- Autosticha imitativa Ueda, 1997
- Autosticha iterata Meyrick, 1916
- Autosticha kyotensis (Matsumura, 1931)
- Autosticha latiuncusa Park & Wu, 2003
- Autosticha leucoptera J. F. G. Clarke, 1986
- Autosticha leukosa Park & Wu, 2003
- Autosticha lushanensis Park & Wu, 2003
- Autosticha maculosa S.X.Wang, 2004
- Autosticha menglunica S.X.Wang, 2004
- Autosticha merista Clarke, 1971
- Autosticha microphilodema S.X.Wang, 2004
- Autosticha mingchrica Park & Wu, 2003
- Autosticha mirabilis S.X.Wang, 2004
- Autosticha modicella (Christoph, 1882)
- Autosticha nanchangensis S.X.Wang, 2004
- Autosticha naulychna Meyrick, 1908
- Autosticha nothriforme (Walsingham, 1897)
- Autosticha nothropis Meyrick, 1921
- Autosticha oxyacantha S.X.Wang, 2004
- Autosticha pachysticta (Meyrick, 1936)
- Autosticha pelaea Meyrick, 1908
- Autosticha pelodes (Meyrick, 1883) – autosticha gelechid moth
- Autosticha pentagona Park & Wu, 2003
- Autosticha perixantha Meyrick, 1914
- Autosticha petrotoma Meyrick, 1916
- Autosticha phaulodes Meyrick, 1908
- Autosticha protypa Meyrick, 1908
- Autosticha pyungyangenis Park & Wu, 2003
- Autosticha rectipunctata S.X.Wang, 2004
- Autosticha relaxata Meyrick, 1916
- Autosticha shenae S.X.Wang, 2004
- Autosticha shexianica S.X.Wang, 2004
- Autosticha siccivora Meyrick, 1935
- Autosticha sichunica Park & Wu, 2003
- Autosticha silacea Bradley, 1962
- Autosticha sinica Park & Wu, 2003
- Autosticha solita Meyrick, 1923
- Autosticha solomonensis Bradley, 1957
- Autosticha spilochorda Meyrick, 1916
- Autosticha squarrosa S.X.Wang, 2004
- Autosticha stagmatopis Meyrick, 1923
- Autosticha strenuella (Walker, 1864)
- Autosticha suwonensis Park & Wu, 2003
- Autosticha symmetra (Turner, 1919)
- Autosticha taiwana Park & Wu, 2003
- Autosticha tetrapeda Meyrick, 1908
- Autosticha tetragonopa (Meyrick, 1935)
- Autosticha thermopis Meyrick, 1923
- Autosticha tianmushana S.X.Wang, 2004
- Autosticha triangulimaculella (Caradja, 1928)
- Autosticha truncicola Ueda, 1997
- Autosticha valvidentata S.X.Wang, 2004
- Autosticha valvifida S.X.Wang, 2004
- Autosticha vicularis Meyrick, 1911
- Autosticha wufengensis S.X.Wang, 2004
- Autosticha xanthographa Meyrick, 1916

Some of these might belong in other genera of Autostichinae, such as the supposedly monotypic Stoeberhinus.

== Former species ==
- Autosticha opaca (Meyrick, 1931)
- Autosticha philodema (Meyrick, 1938)

== Footnotes ==
- Data related to Autosticha at Wikispecies
