= Holcopogon croesus =

Scientific classification
- Kingdom: Animalia
- Phylum: Arthropoda
- Clade: Pancrustacea
- Class: Insecta
- Order: Lepidoptera
- Family: Autostichidae
- Genus: Holcopogon
- Species: H. croesus

Binomial name
- Holcopogon croesus Gozmány, 2000

Species of moth

Holcopogon croesus is a moth in the family Autostichidae. It was described by the Hungarian entomologist László Anthony Gozmány in 2000. It is found in Lebanon.
