= Charadraula =

Scientific classification
- Kingdom: Animalia
- Phylum: Arthropoda
- Class: Insecta
- Order: Lepidoptera
- Family: Autostichidae
- Subfamily: Holcopogoninae
- Genus: Charadraula; Meyrick, 1931

Synonyms
- Bubulcellodes Amsel, 1942

Genus of moths

Charadraula is a moth genus in the family Autostichidae.

== Species ==
- Charadraula cassandra Gozmány, 1967
- Charadraula parcella (Lederer, 1855)

== Former species ==
- Charadraula geminellus (Chrétien, 1915)
