= Autosticha strenuella =

Scientific classification
- Kingdom: Animalia
- Phylum: Arthropoda
- Clade: Pancrustacea
- Class: Insecta
- Order: Lepidoptera
- Family: Autostichidae
- Genus: Autosticha
- Species: A. strenuella

Binomial name
- Autosticha strenuella (Walker, 1864)

Synonyms
- Gelechia strenuella Walker, 1864

Species of moth

Autosticha strenuella is a moth in the family Autostichidae. It was described by Francis Walker in 1864. It is found in Sri Lanka.

Adults are fawn colour, robust, cinereous (ash grey) beneath. The forewings are slightly acute, with four black points at the disk, two before the middle, the other two beyond the middle, the third and fourth behind the first and second. There are some black points along the apical part of the costa and along the exterior border, which is straight and moderately oblique. The hindwings are cinereous.
