= Autosticha tetrapeda =

Scientific classification
- Kingdom: Animalia
- Phylum: Arthropoda
- Clade: Pancrustacea
- Class: Insecta
- Order: Lepidoptera
- Family: Autostichidae
- Genus: Autosticha
- Species: A. tetrapeda

Binomial name
- Autosticha tetrapeda Meyrick, 1908

Species of moth

Autosticha tetrapeda is a moth in the family Autostichidae. It was described by Edward Meyrick in 1908. It is found in southern India.

The wingspan is about 13 mm. The forewings are pale brownish ochreous, sprinkled with fuscous. There are blackish dots on the base of the costa and dorsum. The stigmata are large and blackish, the plical beneath the first discal and a similar blackish spot on the dorsum beneath the second discal. There is an almost marginal row of blackish dots along the posterior part of the costa and termen. The hindwings are light grey, paler and thinly scaled towards the base.
