= Arragonia anatolica =

Scientific classification
- Kingdom: Animalia
- Phylum: Arthropoda
- Clade: Pancrustacea
- Class: Insecta
- Order: Lepidoptera
- Family: Autostichidae
- Genus: Arragonia
- Species: A. anatolica

Binomial name
- Arragonia anatolica Gozmány, 1986

Species of moth

Arragonia anatolica is a moth of the family Autostichidae. It is found in Turkey.

The wingspan is about 23 mm.
