= Autosticha euryterma =

Scientific classification
- Kingdom: Animalia
- Phylum: Arthropoda
- Clade: Pancrustacea
- Class: Insecta
- Order: Lepidoptera
- Family: Autostichidae
- Genus: Autosticha
- Species: A. euryterma

Binomial name
- Autosticha euryterma Meyrick, 1920

Species of moth

Autosticha euryterma is a moth in the family Autostichidae. It was described by Edward Meyrick in 1920. It is found in Kenya.
