= Autosticha xanthographa =

Scientific classification
- Kingdom: Animalia
- Phylum: Arthropoda
- Clade: Pancrustacea
- Class: Insecta
- Order: Lepidoptera
- Family: Autostichidae
- Genus: Autosticha
- Species: A. xanthographa

Binomial name
- Autosticha xanthographa Meyrick, 1916

Species of moth

Autosticha xanthographa is a moth in the family Autostichidae found in Sri Lanka. It was discovered by Edward Meyrick in 1916.

The wingspan is about 15 mm. The forewings are dark fuscous, marked by a small basal spot with ochreous-orange suffusion. The stigmata are indicated by small, cloudy pale ochreous-yellowish spots, with the plical situated beneath the first discal. A similar diffuse spot is present on the dorsum beneath the second discal, along with pale ochreous-yellowish suffusion toward the costa before the apex, within which are two dark fuscous pre-marginal dots. The termen also bears three pale yellowish spots. The hindwings are dark grey.
