= Nephantis =

Scientific classification
- Kingdom: Animalia
- Phylum: Arthropoda
- Class: Insecta
- Order: Lepidoptera
- Family: Autostichidae
- Subfamily: Autostichinae
- Genus: Nephantis; Meyrick, 1905
- Species: N. serinopa

Binomial name
- Nephantis serinopa Meyrick, 1905

Genus of moths

Nephantis serinopa is the only species within the genus Nephantis. N. serinopa is found in Sri Lanka.

The wingspan is 20–28 mm. The forewings are pale greyish-ochreous, with some fine scattered blackish scales and with the extreme costal edge whitish. The first discal stigma is raised, dark fuscous, the plical and second discal indistinct, indicated by two or three dark fuscous scales, the plical obliquely before the first discal. In males, a bare whitish-ochreous patch is found towards the dorsum near the base. The hindwings are whitish ochreous tinged with fuscous.

The larvae conceal themselves beneath galleries of web and excreta on the under-surface of the leaves of coconut palm. In bad attacks, the palm fronds are completely skeletonized.
