= Autosticha imitativa =

Scientific classification
- Kingdom: Animalia
- Phylum: Arthropoda
- Clade: Pancrustacea
- Class: Insecta
- Order: Lepidoptera
- Family: Autostichidae
- Genus: Autosticha
- Species: A. imitativa

Binomial name
- Autosticha imitativa Ueda, 1997

Species of moth

Autosticha imitativa is a moth in the family Autostichidae. It was described by Ueda in 1997. It is found in China (Jiangsu, Jiangxi), Taiwan and Honshu, Japan.

The wingspan is 14–15 mm. The forewings are brownish-ochreous, with relatively small discal stigmata.
