= Autosticha binaria =

Scientific classification
- Kingdom: Animalia
- Phylum: Arthropoda
- Clade: Pancrustacea
- Class: Insecta
- Order: Lepidoptera
- Family: Autostichidae
- Genus: Autosticha
- Species: A. binaria

Binomial name
- Autosticha binaria Meyrick, 1908

Species of moth

Autosticha binaria is a moth belonging to the family Autostichidae. It was first described by Edward Meyrick in 1908 and is found in Sri Lanka.

The wingspan is approximately 13 mm. The forewings are purplish-fuscous, suffused and sprinkled (irrorated) with dark fuscous, while the hindwings blackish.
