= Autosticha solomonensis =

Scientific classification
- Kingdom: Animalia
- Phylum: Arthropoda
- Clade: Pancrustacea
- Class: Insecta
- Order: Lepidoptera
- Family: Autostichidae
- Genus: Autosticha
- Species: A. solomonensis

Binomial name
- Autosticha solomonensis Bradley, 1957

Species of moth

Autosticha solomonensis is a moth in the family Autostichidae. It was described by John David Bradley in 1957. It is found on Rennell Island in the Solomon Islands.
