= Protobathra erista =

Scientific classification
- Kingdom: Animalia
- Phylum: Arthropoda
- Class: Insecta
- Order: Lepidoptera
- Family: Autostichidae
- Genus: Protobathra
- Species: P. erista

Binomial name
- Protobathra erista Meyrick, 1916

Species of moth

Protobathra erista is a moth in the family Autostichidae. It was described by Edward Meyrick in 1916. It is found in southern India.

The wingspan is about 20 mm. The forewings are fuscous, more or less irrorated (sprinkled) suffusedly with dark fuscous and with cloudy dark fuscous 8-shaped spots in the disk before and beyond the middle representing the stigmata. In one specimen, the discal area all round these is wholly suffused with white, extending broadly to the costa and the dorsum beyond the middle, and there is a patch of white suffusion towards the basal portion of the dorsum, and an irregular suffused white subterminal fascia, in the other specimen these white areas are only indicated by some irregular white irroration. The hindwings are fuscous, paler anteriorly.
