= Ptochoryctis acrosticta =

Scientific classification
- Domain: Eukaryota
- Kingdom: Animalia
- Phylum: Arthropoda
- Class: Insecta
- Order: Lepidoptera
- Family: Autostichidae
- Genus: Ptochoryctis
- Species: P. acrosticta

Binomial name
- Ptochoryctis acrosticta Meyrick, 1906

Species of moth

Ptochoryctis acrosticta is a moth in the family Autostichidae. It was described by Edward Meyrick in 1906. It is found in Sri Lanka.

The wingspan is 11–15 mm (0.43–0.59 in). The forewings are shining white with an almost apical dark grey dot. The hindwings are whitish.
