= Hesperesta hartigi =

Scientific classification
- Kingdom: Animalia
- Phylum: Arthropoda
- Class: Insecta
- Order: Lepidoptera
- Family: Autostichidae
- Genus: Hesperesta
- Species: H. hartigi

Binomial name
- Hesperesta hartigi (Turati, 1934)

Synonyms
- Epidola hartigi Turati, 1934

Species of moth

Hesperesta hartigi is a moth in the family Autostichidae. It was described by Turati in 1934. It is found in Libya.
