= Encrasima retractella =

Scientific classification
- Kingdom: Animalia
- Phylum: Arthropoda
- Class: Insecta
- Order: Lepidoptera
- Family: Autostichidae
- Genus: Encrasima
- Species: E. retractella

Binomial name
- Encrasima retractella (Walker, 1864)

Synonyms
- Gelechia retractella Walker, 1864

Species of moth

Encrasima retractella is a moth in the family Autostichidae. It was described by Francis Walker in 1864. It is found in China.

Adults are cinereous, very thickly speckled with brown, the forewings moderately broad, slightly rounded at the tips, with two round blackish dots, one before the middle, one beyond the middle. The exterior border is extremely oblique.
