= Encrasima =

Scientific classification
- Kingdom: Animalia
- Phylum: Arthropoda
- Class: Insecta
- Order: Lepidoptera
- Family: Autostichidae
- Subfamily: Autostichinae
- Genus: Encrasima; Meyrick, 1916

Type species
- Encrasima reversa Meyrick, 1916

Genus of moths

Encrasima is a genus of moths in the family Autostichidae.

== Species ==
- Encrasima elaeopis Meyrick, 1916 (Sri Lanka)
- Encrasima insularis (Butler, 1880) (Madagascar)
- Encrasima simpliciella (Stainton, 1859) (from India)
- Encrasima retractella (Walker, 1864) (from China)
- Encrasima reversa Meyrick, 1916 (Sri Lanka)
- Encrasima xanthoclista Meyrick, 1923 (Sri Lanka)
