= Autosticha relaxata =

Scientific classification
- Kingdom: Animalia
- Phylum: Arthropoda
- Clade: Pancrustacea
- Class: Insecta
- Order: Lepidoptera
- Family: Autostichidae
- Genus: Autosticha
- Species: A. relaxata

Binomial name
- Autosticha relaxata Meyrick, 1916

Species of moth

Autosticha relaxata is a moth in the family Autostichidae. It was described by Edward Meyrick in 1916. It is found in Sri Lanka.

The wingspan is 11–12 mm. The forewings are light greyish ochreous suffusedly irrorated (sprinkled) with fuscous and with the costa suffusedly irrorated with dark fuscous towards the base. There is a cloudy dark fuscous dot beneath the costa near the base. The stigmata are blackish, with the plical obliquely before the first discal, the second discal large. The apical area is more or less suffused with fuscous and there is an almost marginal row of cloudy blackish dots around the posterior part of the costa and termen. The hindwings are grey.
