= Ptochoryctis galbanea =

Scientific classification
- Domain: Eukaryota
- Kingdom: Animalia
- Phylum: Arthropoda
- Class: Insecta
- Order: Lepidoptera
- Family: Autostichidae
- Genus: Ptochoryctis
- Species: P. galbanea

Binomial name
- Ptochoryctis galbanea (Meyrick, 1914)

Synonyms
- Amorbaea galbanea Meyrick, 1914

Species of moth

Ptochoryctis galbanea is a moth in the family Autostichidae. It was described by Edward Meyrick in 1914. It is found Sri Lanka.

The wingspan is 30–32 mm. The forewings are rather dark fuscous, with a faint purplish or orchreous gloss and with the extreme costal edge ochreous whitish. The hindwings are dark fuscous.
