= Autosticha merista =

Scientific classification
- Kingdom: Animalia
- Phylum: Arthropoda
- Clade: Pancrustacea
- Class: Insecta
- Order: Lepidoptera
- Family: Autostichidae
- Genus: Autosticha
- Species: A. merista

Binomial name
- Autosticha merista Clarke, 1971

Species of moth

Autosticha merista is a moth in the family Autostichidae. It was described by Clarke in 1971. It is found on Rapa Iti.
