= Autosticha demias =

Scientific classification
- Kingdom: Animalia
- Phylum: Arthropoda
- Clade: Pancrustacea
- Class: Insecta
- Order: Lepidoptera
- Family: Autostichidae
- Genus: Autosticha
- Species: A. demias

Binomial name
- Autosticha demias Meyrick, 1886

Species of moth

Autosticha demias is a moth in the family Autostichidae. It was described by Edward Meyrick in 1886. It is found on Fiji.

The wingspan is about 18 mm. The forewings are pale ochreous, thinly irrorated (sprinkled) with dark fuscous and a blackish dot on the inner margin near the base. There is a blackish dot in the disc before the middle, a second rather obliquely before it on the fold, and a third larger in the disc beyond the middle and an almost marginal row of blackish dots between the veins on the hind margin and the apical fourth of the costa. The hindwings are pale whitish grey, slightly ochreous tinged.
