= Protobathra =

Scientific classification
- Kingdom: Animalia
- Phylum: Arthropoda
- Clade: Pancrustacea
- Class: Insecta
- Order: Lepidoptera
- Family: Autostichidae
- Subfamily: Autostichinae
- Genus: Protobathra; Meyrick, 1916

Genus of moths

Protobathra is a moth genus in the subfamily Autostichinae.

== Species ==
- Protobathra binotata Bradley, 1961
- Protobathra erista Meyrick, 1916
- Protobathra coenotypa (Meyrick, 1918)

== Former species ==
- Protobathra leucostola Meyrick, 1921
