= Encrasima elaeopis =

Scientific classification
- Kingdom: Animalia
- Phylum: Arthropoda
- Class: Insecta
- Order: Lepidoptera
- Family: Autostichidae
- Genus: Encrasima
- Species: E. elaeopis

Binomial name
- Encrasima elaeopis Meyrick, 1916

Species of moth

Encrasima elaeopis is a moth in the family Autostichidae. It was described by Edward Meyrick in 1916. It is found in Sri Lanka.

The wingspan is 20–22 mm. The forewings are ochreous yellow, more or less greyish tinged except towards the costa. The stigmata are blackish, the plical somewhat beyond the first discal. There is an almost marginal row of blackish dots around the posterior part of the costa and termen. The hindwings are grey.
