= Encrasima simpliciella =

Scientific classification
- Kingdom: Animalia
- Phylum: Arthropoda
- Clade: Pancrustacea
- Class: Insecta
- Order: Lepidoptera
- Family: Autostichidae
- Genus: Encrasima
- Species: E. simpliciella

Binomial name
- Encrasima simpliciella (Stainton, 1859)

Synonyms
- Gelechia simpliciella Stainton, 1859; Encrasima communicata Meyrick, 1918

Species of moth

Encrasima simpliciella is a moth in the family Autostichidae. It was described by Stainton in 1859. It is found in India (Bengal).

The wingspan is about 12 mm. The forewings are pale ochreous, the costa suffused yellow. The second discal stigma is cloudy and fuscous. The hindwings are light grey.
