= Ptochoryctis simbleuta =

Scientific classification
- Domain: Eukaryota
- Kingdom: Animalia
- Phylum: Arthropoda
- Class: Insecta
- Order: Lepidoptera
- Family: Autostichidae
- Genus: Ptochoryctis
- Species: P. simbleuta

Binomial name
- Ptochoryctis simbleuta Meyrick, 1907

Species of moth

Ptochoryctis simbleuta is a moth in the family Autostichidae. It was described by Edward Meyrick in 1907. It is found Assam, India.

The wingspan is 11–17 mm. The forewings are white, with some irregularly scattered black scales, especially in the disc. There is a patch of cloudy fuscous suffusion extending from the disc beyond the middle to the tornus and there is a pre-marginal series of black dots from four-fifths of the costa to the tornus. The hindwings are pale grey.

The larvae feed beneath a web covered with refuse and pieces of bark, on bark of shoots of the tea plant, eating right through to the cambium, and thus killing the branch or plant. The larvae are brick red.
