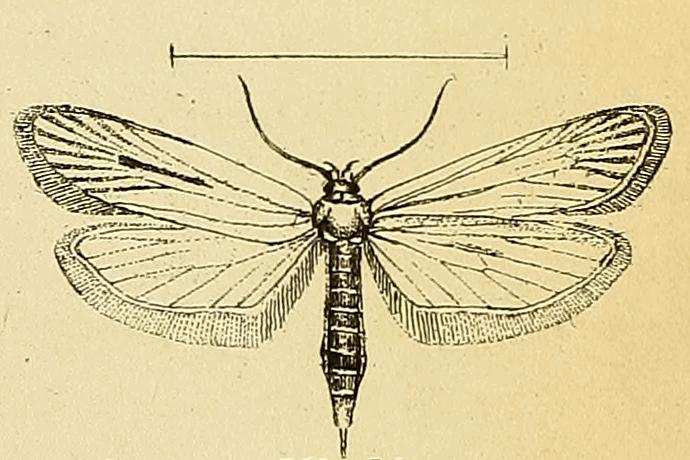

Scientific classification
- Kingdom: Animalia
- Phylum: Arthropoda
- Class: Insecta
- Order: Lepidoptera
- Family: Autostichidae
- Genus: Deroxena
- Species: D. venosulella

Binomial name
- Deroxena venosulella (Möschler, 1862)

Synonyms
- Depressaria venosulella Möschler, 1862; Depressaria neglectella Lederer, 1863

= Deroxena venosulella =

Species of moth

Deroxena venosulella is a moth of the family Autostichidae. It is found in Liechtenstein, France, Italy, Austria, Slovakia, Hungary, Romania, Greece and Russia.

The wingspan is about 19–24 mm.

== Subspecies ==
- Deroxena venosulella venosulella
- Deroxena venosulella gallica Fischer, 1949
- Deroxena venosulella neglectella (Lederer, 1863)
