= Autosticha tetragonopa =

Scientific classification
- Kingdom: Animalia
- Phylum: Arthropoda
- Clade: Pancrustacea
- Class: Insecta
- Order: Lepidoptera
- Family: Autostichidae
- Genus: Autosticha
- Species: A. tetragonopa

Binomial name
- Autosticha tetragonopa (Meyrick, 1935)

Synonyms
- Brachmia tetragonopa Meyrick, 1935

Species of moth

Autosticha tetragonopa is a moth in the family Autostichidae. It was described by Edward Meyrick in 1935. It is found in China and Japan (Honshu, Kyushu).

The wingspan is 14–15 mm. The forewings are yellowish white with large discal stigmata.
