= Autosticha affixella =

Scientific classification
- Kingdom: Animalia
- Phylum: Arthropoda
- Clade: Pancrustacea
- Class: Insecta
- Order: Lepidoptera
- Family: Autostichidae
- Genus: Autosticha
- Species: A. affixella

Binomial name
- Autosticha affixella (Walker, 1864)

Synonyms
- Gelechia affixella Walker, 1864

Species of moth

Autosticha affixella is a moth in the family Autostichidae. It was described by Francis Walker in 1864. It is found in Sri Lanka.

Adults are fawn colour, paler beneath. The forewings are acute with the exterior border straight, hardly oblique and the hindwings are hardly paler than the forewings.
