= Anaptilora parasira =

Scientific classification
- Kingdom: Animalia
- Phylum: Arthropoda
- Class: Insecta
- Order: Lepidoptera
- Family: Autostichidae
- Genus: Anaptilora
- Species: A. parasira

Binomial name
- Anaptilora parasira Meyrick, 1916

Species of moth

Anaptilora parasira is a moth in the family Gelechiidae. It was described by Edward Meyrick in 1916. It is found in Australia, where it has been recorded from the Northern Territory.

The wingspan is 11–12 mm. The forewings are whitish ochreous, with scattered dark fuscous specks and blackish stigmata, the plical is slightly before the first discal. There is a marginal row of blackish dots around the posterior part of the costa and termen. The upper part of the termen on the hindwings are rather strongly oblique. They are grey whitish.
