= Arragonia =

Scientific classification
- Domain: Eukaryota
- Kingdom: Animalia
- Phylum: Arthropoda
- Class: Insecta
- Order: Lepidoptera
- Family: Autostichidae
- Subfamily: Holcopogoninae
- Genus: Arragonia; Amsel, 1942

Genus of moths

Arragonia is a moth genus in the family Autostichidae.

== Species ==
- Arragonia anatolica Gozmány, 1986
- Arragonia kautzi (Rebel, 1928)
- Arragonia punctivittellus (Zerny, 1927)
- Arragonia tunesiella Amsel, 1942
