= Protobathra binotata =

Scientific classification
- Domain: Eukaryota
- Kingdom: Animalia
- Phylum: Arthropoda
- Class: Insecta
- Order: Lepidoptera
- Family: Autostichidae
- Genus: Protobathra
- Species: P. binotata

Binomial name
- Protobathra binotata Bradley, 1961

Species of moth

Protobathra binotata is a moth in the family Autostichidae. It was described by John David Bradley in 1961. It is found on Guadalcanal in the Solomon Islands.
