= Ischnodoris sigalota =

Scientific classification
- Kingdom: Animalia
- Phylum: Arthropoda
- Class: Insecta
- Order: Lepidoptera
- Family: Gelechiidae
- Genus: Ischnodoris
- Species: I. sigalota

Binomial name
- Ischnodoris sigalota Meyrick, 1911

Species of moth

Ischnodoris sigalota is a moth in the family Autostichidae. It was described by Edward Meyrick in 1911. It is found in Sri Lanka.

The wingspan is 11–12 mm. The forewings are pale whitish ochreous closely irrorated (sprinkled) with brownish. The stigmata are rather large and black, the plical smaller, slightly beyond the first discal. There is a spot of blackish suffusion on the dorsum slightly before the second discal and row of cloudy blackish dots or groups of scales close before the margin around the termen and posterior part of the costa. The hindwings are grey.
