= Anaptilora =

Scientific classification
- Kingdom: Animalia
- Phylum: Arthropoda
- Clade: Pancrustacea
- Class: Insecta
- Order: Lepidoptera
- Family: Autostichidae
- Subfamily: Autostichinae
- Genus: Anaptilora; Meyrick, 1904

Genus of moths

Anaptilora is a moth genus. It is here placed in subfamily Autostichinae of family Autostichidae, though some authors assign it elsewhere in the Gelechioidea.

All species of this genus are found in Australia.

== Species ==
- Anaptilora basiphaea Turner, 1919
- Anaptilora ephelotis Meyrick, 1916
- Anaptilora eremias Meyrick, 1904
- Anaptilora haplospila Turner, 1919
- Anaptilora homoclera Meyrick, 1916
- Anaptilora isocosma Meyrick, 1904
- Anaptilora parasira Meyrick, 1916

== Former species ==
- Anaptilora basipercna Turner, 1933
