= Autosticha perixantha =

Scientific classification
- Kingdom: Animalia
- Phylum: Arthropoda
- Clade: Pancrustacea
- Class: Insecta
- Order: Lepidoptera
- Family: Autostichidae
- Genus: Autosticha
- Species: A. perixantha

Binomial name
- Autosticha perixantha Meyrick, 1914

Species of moth

Autosticha perixantha is a moth in the family Autostichidae. It was described by Edward Meyrick in 1914. It is found in Mozambique.

The wingspan is about 14 mm. The forewings are dark violet fuscous with the costa slenderly orange. The hindwings are dark fuscous.
