= Ptochoryctis scionota =

Scientific classification
- Domain: Eukaryota
- Kingdom: Animalia
- Phylum: Arthropoda
- Class: Insecta
- Order: Lepidoptera
- Family: Autostichidae
- Genus: Ptochoryctis
- Species: P. scionota

Binomial name
- Ptochoryctis scionota Meyrick, 1906

Species of moth

Ptochoryctis scionota is a moth in the family Autostichidae. It was described by Edward Meyrick in 1906. It is found in Sri Lanka.

The wingspan is 16–17 mm (0.63–0.67 in). The forewings are shining white, towards the dorsum faintly suffused with pale ochreous. The hindwings are whitish, sometimes faintly greyish tinged. The termen is tinged with pale greyish ochreous.
