= Autosticha acharacta =

Scientific classification
- Kingdom: Animalia
- Phylum: Arthropoda
- Clade: Pancrustacea
- Class: Insecta
- Order: Lepidoptera
- Family: Autostichidae
- Genus: Autosticha
- Species: A. acharacta

Binomial name
- Autosticha acharacta Meyrick, 1918

Species of moth

Autosticha acharacta is a moth in the family Autostichidae. It was described by Edward Meyrick in 1918. It is found in northwestern India.

== Description ==
The wingspan is 12–15 mm. The forewings are pale ochreous irrorated (sprinkled) with fuscous. The stigmata are small and dark fuscous, the plical is slightly before the first discal, a cloudy dot on the dorsum beneath the second discal. There is an almost marginal series of cloudy dark fuscous dots around the posterior part of the costa and termen, in females less distinct. The hindwings are light greyish.

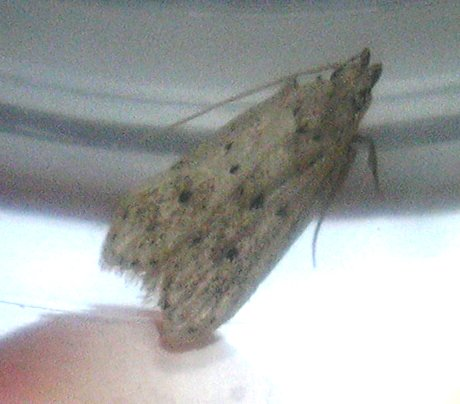
Autosticha moth
