= Autosticha pachysticta =

Scientific classification
- Kingdom: Animalia
- Phylum: Arthropoda
- Clade: Pancrustacea
- Class: Insecta
- Order: Lepidoptera
- Family: Autostichidae
- Genus: Autosticha
- Species: A. pachysticta

Binomial name
- Autosticha pachysticta (Meyrick, 1936)

Synonyms
- Semnolocha pachysticta Meyrick, 1936

Species of moth

Autosticha pachysticta is a moth in the family Autostichidae. It was described by Edward Meyrick in 1936. It is found in Korea, Japan (Honshu, Shikoku, Kyushu, Ryukyus) and Sichuan, China.
