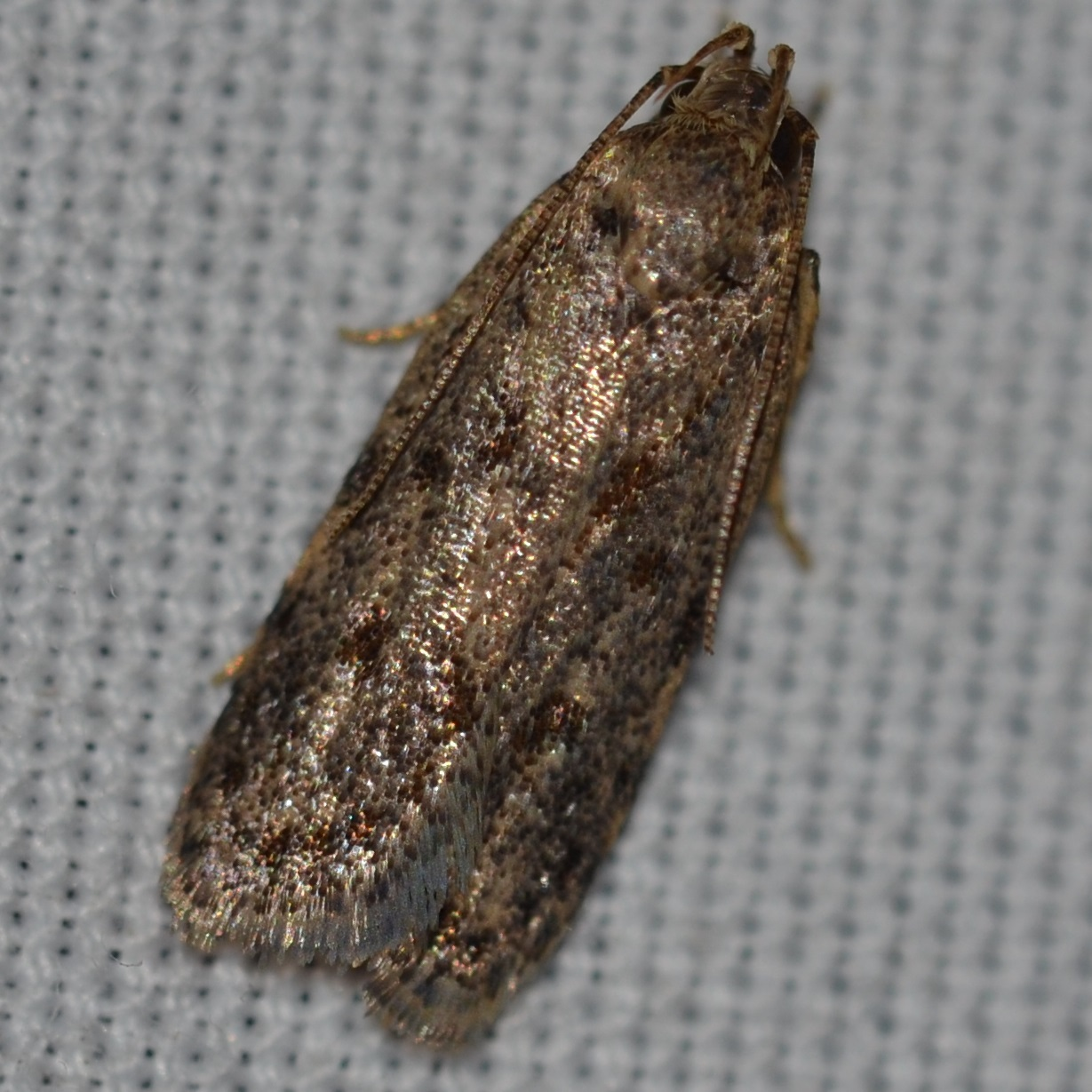

Scientific classification
- Kingdom: Animalia
- Phylum: Arthropoda
- Clade: Pancrustacea
- Class: Insecta
- Order: Lepidoptera
- Family: Autostichidae
- Subfamily: Autostichinae
- Genus: Stoeberhinus; Butler, 1881
- Species: S. testaceus

Binomial name
- Stoeberhinus testaceus Butler, 1881

Synonyms
- Numerous, see text

= Stoeberhinus =

Potato moth

Species of moth

Stoeberhinus testaceus, the potato moth, is a gelechioid moth, supposedly the only species of its genus Stoeberhinus. However, the genus might also include some related moths presently placed in Autosticha. It belongs to the subfamily Autostichinae, which is either placed in the concealer moth family (Oecophoridae), or in an expanded Autostichidae.

It is a small moth with buff and brown-mottled (potato-colored) forewings. Like Autosticha, this moth has the second and third forewing vein emerging from a common stalk; unlike in that genus, the labial palps of S. testaceus males are beset with feathery hairs, while the labial palps of the females are inconspicuous and do not taper like those of both sexes of Autosticha.

This moth is common and widespread in the warmer parts of the Pacific region. It was originally described by Arthur Gardiner Butler in 1881 from specimens collected at Honolulu, Hawaii. The species has since been recorded from Java, the New Hebrides, Fiji, Samoa, the Cook Islands, the Marquesas across the Society and Tuamotu Islands to the Austral Islands, as well as from the Galápagos Islands (though it might not breed there). Its origin is not well understood and it seems to be something of a "supertramp species".

The caterpillar larvae eat all sorts of dry leaves, in which they build silken tunnels. They have also been recorded on living plants of the looking-glass mangrove (Heritiera littoralis), though the significance of this is unknown.

== Synonyms ==
This moth has become known under several invalid scientific names. For the genus, these are:

- Staeberhinus (lapsus)
- Staeberrhinus Rye, 1882 (unjustified emendation)

For the species:

- Stoeberhinus testacea (lapsus)
- Stoeberhinus testaceous Swezey, 1910 (unjustified emendation)
