= Ptochoryctis eremopa =

Scientific classification
- Domain: Eukaryota
- Kingdom: Animalia
- Phylum: Arthropoda
- Class: Insecta
- Order: Lepidoptera
- Family: Autostichidae
- Genus: Ptochoryctis
- Species: P. eremopa

Binomial name
- Ptochoryctis eremopa Meyrick, 1894

Species of moth

Ptochoryctis eremopa is a moth in the family Autostichidae. It was described by Edward Meyrick in 1894. It is found in Myanmar.

The wingspan is about 17 mm. The forewings are whitish ochreous, on the posterior half thinly sprinkled with ochreous brown. The inner margin is indistinctly suffused with ochreous fuscous. The hindwings are light grey.
