= Autosticha vicularis =

Scientific classification
- Kingdom: Animalia
- Phylum: Arthropoda
- Clade: Pancrustacea
- Class: Insecta
- Order: Lepidoptera
- Family: Autostichidae
- Genus: Autosticha
- Species: A. vicularis

Binomial name
- Autosticha vicularis Meyrick, 1911

Species of moth

Autosticha vicularis is a moth in the family Autostichidae. It was described by Edward Meyrick in 1911. It is found in Sri Lanka.

The wingspan is 9–12 mm. The forewings are pale ochreous, more or less sprinkled with dark fuscous. The stigmata are black, the plical rather obliquely before the first discal, the second discal sometimes rather large. There is a small spot of blackish suffusion on the dorsum beneath the second discal and a row of cloudy blackish dots close before the posterior third of the costa and termen. The hindwings are grey.
