= Autosticha thermopis =

Scientific classification
- Kingdom: Animalia
- Phylum: Arthropoda
- Clade: Pancrustacea
- Class: Insecta
- Order: Lepidoptera
- Family: Autostichidae
- Genus: Autosticha
- Species: A. thermopis

Binomial name
- Autosticha thermopis Meyrick, 1923

Species of moth

Autosticha thermopis is a moth in the family Autostichidae. It was described by Edward Meyrick in 1923. It is found in Sri Lanka.

The wingspan is about 15 mm. The forewings are ferruginous brownish. The stigmata are large, cloudy, darker, the plical beneath the first discal, the second discal transverse. There is a pre-marginal series of faint cloudy similar spots around the posterior part of the costa and termen. The hindwings are dark grey.
