= Autosticha aureolata =

Scientific classification
- Kingdom: Animalia
- Phylum: Arthropoda
- Clade: Pancrustacea
- Class: Insecta
- Order: Lepidoptera
- Family: Autostichidae
- Genus: Autosticha
- Species: A. aureolata

Binomial name
- Autosticha aureolata Meyrick, 1908

Species of moth

Autosticha aureolata is a moth in the family Autostichidae. It was described by Edward Meyrick in 1908. It is found in Sri Lanka.

The wingspan is 14–15 mm. The forewings are purplish fuscous, irrorated (sprinkled) with dark fuscous, more or less mixed with ochreous brownish. The stigmata are very indistinct and dark fuscous, the plical almost beneath the first discal. The hindwings are dark grey.
