= Autosticha petrotoma =

Scientific classification
- Kingdom: Animalia
- Phylum: Arthropoda
- Clade: Pancrustacea
- Class: Insecta
- Order: Lepidoptera
- Family: Autostichidae
- Genus: Autosticha
- Species: A. petrotoma

Binomial name
- Autosticha petrotoma Meyrick, 1916

Species of moth

Autosticha petrotoma is a moth in the family Autostichidae. It was described by Edward Meyrick in 1916. It is found in Sri Lanka.

The wingspan is about 18 mm. The forewings are grey whitish speckled with black and with a black dot on the base of the costa, and a subcostal one close beyond it. There are small black spots on the costa at one-fifth and before and beyond the middle. The stigmata are black, the plical and first discal small, the plical rather obliquely posterior, the second discal larger, confluent with a blackish spot lying above and beyond it. There are three black dots on the costa posteriorly, from the first of which a curved series of black dots runs to the tornus, closely adjacent to the termen on the lower half. There are also some undefined small black dots on the termen. The hindwings are light grey.
