= Pudahuelia =

Scientific classification
- Kingdom: Animalia
- Phylum: Arthropoda
- Class: Insecta
- Order: Lepidoptera
- Family: Autostichidae
- Subfamily: Autostichinae
- Genus: Pudahuelia; Urra, 2013
- Species: P. modesta

Binomial name
- Pudahuelia modesta Urra, 2013

Genus of moths

Pudahuelia is a moth genus in the subfamily Autostichinae. It contains the species Pudahuelia modesta, which is found in central Chile.

The wingspan is 14–17 mm for males and 15–17 mm for females.
