= Autosticha encycota =

Scientific classification
- Kingdom: Animalia
- Phylum: Arthropoda
- Clade: Pancrustacea
- Class: Insecta
- Order: Lepidoptera
- Family: Autostichidae
- Genus: Autosticha
- Species: A. encycota

Binomial name
- Autosticha encycota Meyrick, 1922

Species of moth

Autosticha encycota is a moth in the family Autostichidae. It was described by Edward Meyrick in 1922. It is found in Chennai, India.

The wingspan is about 16 mm. The forewings are fuscous irregularly mixed with whitish and blackish with a dark fuscous dot on the base of the costa edged with whitish beneath. The stigmata are large, cloudy, and blackish, the plical slightly before the first discal, the second discal largest, the space between the discal and beyond the second more whitish without blackish mixture. There is an almost marginal series of blackish dots around the posterior part of the costa and termen. The hindwings are greyish.
