= Autosticha spilochorda =

Scientific classification
- Kingdom: Animalia
- Phylum: Arthropoda
- Clade: Pancrustacea
- Class: Insecta
- Order: Lepidoptera
- Family: Autostichidae
- Genus: Autosticha
- Species: A. spilochorda

Binomial name
- Autosticha spilochorda Meyrick, 1916

Species of moth

Autosticha spilochorda is a moth in the family Autostichidae. It was described by Edward Meyrick in 1916. It is found in southern India.

The wingspan is about 20 mm. The forewings are light brown, sprinkled with whitish, except on a broad median longitudinal streak. The costal edge is blackish towards the base and there is a blackish line along the fold from near the base to beneath the first discal stigma. The discal stigmata are moderately large, blackish, and connected by a slender undefined dark fuscous line. Between the second discal and the upper part of the termen are dark fuscous scales scattered along the veins and there is an almost marginal series of indistinct cloudy dark fuscous dots around the posterior part of the costa and termen. The hindwings are rather light grey.
