= Autosticha auxodelta =

Scientific classification
- Kingdom: Animalia
- Phylum: Arthropoda
- Clade: Pancrustacea
- Class: Insecta
- Order: Lepidoptera
- Family: Autostichidae
- Genus: Autosticha
- Species: A. auxodelta

Binomial name
- Autosticha auxodelta Meyrick, 1916

Species of moth

Autosticha auxodelta is a moth in the family Autostichidae. It was described by Edward Meyrick in 1916. It is found in Assam, India.

The wingspan is about 13 mm. The forewings are dark fuscous with a large ochreous-yellow triangular blotch, edged anteriorly with ochreous whitish, extending on the costa from two-fifths to four-fifths, its apex touching the dorsum beyond the middle. The second discal stigma is blackish, resting on the posterior edge of this blotch. There is a terminal series of ochreous-whitish dots. The hindwings are grey.
