= Anaptilora eremias =

Scientific classification
- Kingdom: Animalia
- Phylum: Arthropoda
- Class: Insecta
- Order: Lepidoptera
- Family: Autostichidae
- Genus: Anaptilora
- Species: A. eremias

Binomial name
- Anaptilora eremias Meyrick, 1904

Species of moth

Anaptilora eremias is a moth in the family Gelechiidae. It was described by Edward Meyrick in 1904. It is found in Australia, where it has been recorded from Queensland.

The wingspan is 14–16 mm. The forewings are pale brownish ochreous sprinkled with dark fuscous. The stigmata is cloudy, dark fuscous, with the plical beneath the first discal. There is a row of cloudy dark fuscous spots along the posterior part of the costa and termen and sometimes some dark suffusion towards the tornus and apex. The hindwings are grey.
