= Charadraula parcella =

Scientific classification
- Domain: Eukaryota
- Kingdom: Animalia
- Phylum: Arthropoda
- Class: Insecta
- Order: Lepidoptera
- Family: Autostichidae
- Genus: Charadraula
- Species: C. parcella

Binomial name
- Charadraula parcella (Lederer, 1855)

Synonyms
- Hapsifera parcella Lederer, 1855; Charadraula chersopsamma Meyrick, 1932

Species of moth

Charadraula parcella is a moth in the family Autostichidae. It was described by Julius Lederer in 1855. It is found in Syria and Israel.
