= Autosticha flavescens =

Scientific classification
- Kingdom: Animalia
- Phylum: Arthropoda
- Clade: Pancrustacea
- Class: Insecta
- Order: Lepidoptera
- Family: Autostichidae
- Genus: Autosticha
- Species: A. flavescens

Binomial name
- Autosticha flavescens Meyrick, 1916

Species of moth

Autosticha flavescens is a moth in the family Autostichidae. It was described by Edward Meyrick in 1916. It is found in Sri Lanka.

The wingspan is 14–15 mm. The forewings are light ochreous yellowish, irregularly clouded with coarse blackish irroration (sprinkles) and with a strong blackish dot on the base of the costa. The stigmata are represented by round cloudy blackish spots, the plical beneath the first discal. There is an irregular grey patch irrorated with black occupying the apical area except the margins and there is an almost marginal series of small cloudy blackish spots around the posterior half of the costa and termen. The hindwings are grey.
