= Autosticha leucoptera =

Scientific classification
- Kingdom: Animalia
- Phylum: Arthropoda
- Clade: Pancrustacea
- Class: Insecta
- Order: Lepidoptera
- Family: Autostichidae
- Genus: Autosticha
- Species: A. leucoptera

Binomial name
- Autosticha leucoptera J. F. G. Clarke, 1986

Species of moth

Autosticha leucoptera is a moth in the family Autostichidae. It was described by John Frederick Gates Clarke in 1986. It is found on the Marquesas Archipelago in French Polynesia.
