= Autosticha sinica =

Scientific classification
- Kingdom: Animalia
- Phylum: Arthropoda
- Clade: Pancrustacea
- Class: Insecta
- Order: Lepidoptera
- Family: Autostichidae
- Genus: Autosticha
- Species: A. sinica

Binomial name
- Autosticha sinica Park & C. S. Wu, 2003

Species of moth

Autosticha sinica is a moth in the family Autostichidae. It was described by Kyu-Tek Park and Chun-Sheng Wu in 2003. It is found in Sichuan, China.

The wingspan is 17–18 mm.
