= Autosticha iterata =

Scientific classification
- Kingdom: Animalia
- Phylum: Arthropoda
- Clade: Pancrustacea
- Class: Insecta
- Order: Lepidoptera
- Family: Autostichidae
- Genus: Autosticha
- Species: A. iterata

Binomial name
- Autosticha iterata Meyrick, 1916

Species of moth

Autosticha iterata is a moth in the family Autostichidae. It was described by Edward Meyrick in 1916. It is found in Sri Lanka.

The wingspan is about 10 mm. The forewings are pale ochreous, somewhat sprinkled with fuscous and dark fuscous and with the base of the costa blackish. There are blackish subcostal and dorsal dots near the base. The stigmata are large and blackish, the plical rather obliquely before the first discal. In females, there are cloudy spots of dark grey irroration (speckles) on the costa at three-fourths and the dorsum opposite. There is also an almost marginal series of cloudy blackish dots around the posterior part of the costa and termen. The hindwings are pale grey.
