= Autosticha silacea =

Scientific classification
- Kingdom: Animalia
- Phylum: Arthropoda
- Clade: Pancrustacea
- Class: Insecta
- Order: Lepidoptera
- Family: Autostichidae
- Genus: Autosticha
- Species: A. silacea

Binomial name
- Autosticha silacea Bradley, 1962

Species of moth

Autosticha silacea is a moth in the family Autostichidae. It was described by John David Bradley in 1962. It is found on the New Hebrides.
