= Diophila bathrota =

Scientific classification
- Kingdom: Animalia
- Phylum: Arthropoda
- Class: Insecta
- Order: Lepidoptera
- Family: Autostichidae
- Genus: Diophila
- Species: D. bathrota

Binomial name
- Diophila bathrota (Meyrick, 1911)

Synonyms
- Mompha bathrota Meyrick, 1911

Species of moth

Diophila bathrota is a moth in the family Autostichidae. It is found in South Africa.
