= Autosticha triangulimaculella =

Scientific classification
- Kingdom: Animalia
- Phylum: Arthropoda
- Clade: Pancrustacea
- Class: Insecta
- Order: Lepidoptera
- Family: Autostichidae
- Genus: Autosticha
- Species: A. triangulimaculella

Binomial name
- Autosticha triangulimaculella (Caradja, 1928)

Synonyms
- Tinea triangulimaculella Caradja, 1928

Species of moth

Autosticha triangulimaculella is a moth in the family Autostichidae. It was described by Aristide Caradja in 1928. It is found in China.
