= Autosticha rectipunctata =

Scientific classification
- Kingdom: Animalia
- Phylum: Arthropoda
- Clade: Pancrustacea
- Class: Insecta
- Order: Lepidoptera
- Family: Autostichidae
- Genus: Autosticha
- Species: A. rectipunctata

Binomial name
- Autosticha rectipunctata S.X. Wang, 2004

Species of moth

Autosticha rectipunctata is a moth in the family Autostichidae. It was described by S.X. Wang in 2004. It is found in China (Jiangxi).
