= Arragonia tunesiella =

Scientific classification
- Domain: Eukaryota
- Kingdom: Animalia
- Phylum: Arthropoda
- Class: Insecta
- Order: Lepidoptera
- Family: Autostichidae
- Genus: Arragonia
- Species: A. tunesiella

Binomial name
- Arragonia tunesiella Amsel, 1942

Species of moth

Arragonia tunesiella is a moth in the family Autostichidae. It was described by Hans Georg Amsel in 1942. It is found in Tunisia.
