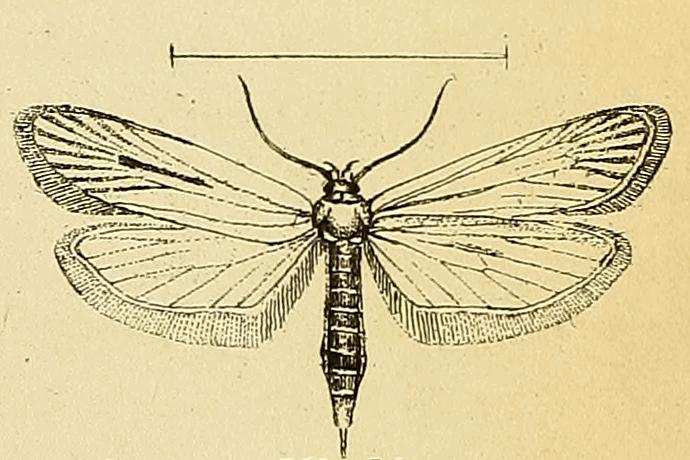

Scientific classification
- Kingdom: Animalia
- Phylum: Arthropoda
- Class: Insecta
- Order: Lepidoptera
- Family: Autostichidae
- Subfamily: Autostichinae
- Genus: Deroxena; Meyrick, 1913

= Deroxena =

Genus of moths

Deroxena is a genus of moths in the Gelechioidea subfamily Autostichinae, which is either placed in the Oecophoridae or in an expanded Autostichidae.

== Species ==
- Deroxena conioleuca Meyrick, 1926
- Deroxena venosulella (Möschler, 1862)
