= Anaptilora isocosma =

Scientific classification
- Kingdom: Animalia
- Phylum: Arthropoda
- Class: Insecta
- Order: Lepidoptera
- Family: Autostichidae
- Genus: Anaptilora
- Species: A. isocosma

Binomial name
- Anaptilora isocosma (Meyrick, 1904)

Synonyms
- Anaptiplora isocosma Meyrick, 1904

Species of moth

Anaptilora isocosma is a moth in the family Gelechiidae. It was described by Edward Meyrick in 1904. It is found in Australia, where it has been recorded from the Northern Territory and Queensland.

The wingspan is 13–14 mm (0.51–0.55 in). The forewings are white, with a moderate straight dark brown basal fascia and a broad slightly oblique straight ochreous-brown postmedian fascia. There is an ochreous-yellowish suffusion towards the apex and there are some cloudy dark fuscous dots around the apex and upper part of the termen. The hindwings are dark grey.
