= Autosticha phaulodes =

Scientific classification
- Kingdom: Animalia
- Phylum: Arthropoda
- Clade: Pancrustacea
- Class: Insecta
- Order: Lepidoptera
- Family: Autostichidae
- Genus: Autosticha
- Species: A. phaulodes

Binomial name
- Autosticha phaulodes Meyrick, 1908

Species of moth

Autosticha phaulodes is a moth in the family Autostichidae. It was described by Edward Meyrick in 1908. It is found in Sri Lanka.

The wingspan is 12–15 mm. The forewings are brownish-ochreous, irrorated (sprinkled) with fuscous and dark fuscous. The stigmata are moderate or large and dark fuscous, the plical somewhat before the first discal. There is a small pre-tornal spot of dark fuscous suffusion and an almost marginal series of dark fuscous dots along the posterior portion of the costa and termen. The hindwings are grey.
