= Stochastica =

Scientific classification
- Kingdom: Animalia
- Phylum: Arthropoda
- Class: Insecta
- Order: Lepidoptera
- Family: Autostichidae
- Subfamily: Autostichinae
- Genus: Stochastica; Meyrick in Caradja & Meyrick, 1938
- Species: S. virgularia

Binomial name
- Stochastica virgularia Meyrick, 1938

Genus of moths

Stochastica is a moth genus in the subfamily Autostichinae. It contains the species Stochastica virgularia, which is found in China (Yunnan).
