= Gobiletria =

Scientific classification
- Kingdom: Animalia
- Phylum: Arthropoda
- Clade: Pancrustacea
- Class: Insecta
- Order: Lepidoptera
- Family: Autostichidae
- Subfamily: Holcopogoninae
- Genus: Gobiletria; Gozmány, 1964
- Species: G. kaszabi

Binomial name
- Gobiletria kaszabi Gozmány, 1964

Genus of moths

Gobiletria is a moth genus in the family Autostichidae. It contains the species Gobiletria kaszabi, which is found in Mongolia.
