= Autosticha conciliata =

Scientific classification
- Kingdom: Animalia
- Phylum: Arthropoda
- Clade: Pancrustacea
- Class: Insecta
- Order: Lepidoptera
- Family: Autostichidae
- Genus: Autosticha
- Species: A. conciliata

Binomial name
- Autosticha conciliata Meyrick, 1918

Species of moth

Autosticha conciliata is a moth in the family Autostichidae. It was described by Edward Meyrick in 1918. It is found in Chennai, India.

The wingspan is about 11 mm. The forewings are pale ochreous, sprinkled with light fuscous. The base of the costal edge is dark fuscous. The stigmata are small, cloudy and dark fuscous, the plical slightly before the first discal. There is an almost marginal series of small cloudy dark fuscous dots around the apex and termen. The hindwings are ochreous-whitish.
