= Sipsa =

Scientific classification
- Kingdom: Animalia
- Phylum: Arthropoda
- Class: Insecta
- Order: Lepidoptera
- Family: Autostichidae
- Subfamily: Autostichinae
- Genus: Sipsa; Diakonoff, 1955
- Species: S. tritoma

Binomial name
- Sipsa tritoma Diakonoff, 1955

Genus of moths

Sipsa is a moth genus in the subfamily Autostichinae. It contains the species Sipsa tritoma, which is found in New Guinea.
