= Holcopogon scaeocentra =

Scientific classification
- Kingdom: Animalia
- Phylum: Arthropoda
- Class: Insecta
- Order: Lepidoptera
- Family: Autostichidae
- Genus: Holcopogon
- Species: H. scaeocentra

Binomial name
- Holcopogon scaeocentra Meyrick, 1921

Species of moth

Holcopogon scaeocentra is a moth in the family Autostichidae. It was described by Edward Meyrick in 1921. It is found in Mozambique and South Africa.

== Description ==
The wingspan is 13–14 mm. The forewings are white irregularly irrorated (sprinkled) with light greyish ochreous and with a black dot towards the costa near the base. The stigmata are rather large and black, the plical very obliquely beyond the first discal, the second discal approximated to the tornus. There is a marginal series of black dots around the posterior part of the costa and termen. The hindwings are very pale yellowish grey.
