= Autosticha demetrias =

Scientific classification
- Kingdom: Animalia
- Phylum: Arthropoda
- Clade: Pancrustacea
- Class: Insecta
- Order: Lepidoptera
- Family: Autostichidae
- Genus: Autosticha
- Species: A. demetrias

Binomial name
- Autosticha demetrias Meyrick, 1908

Species of moth

Autosticha demetrias is a moth in the family Autostichidae. It was described by Edward Meyrick in 1908. It is found in Sri Lanka.

The wingspan is 13–16 mm. The forewings are deep ochreous yellow or yellow ochreous, with some scattered blackish scales, sometimes considerably mixed and suffused with brown. There is a blackish dot on the base of the costa. The stigmata are moderate and blackish, the plical somewhat obliquely before the first discal and there is a short rather inwardly oblique blackish streak from the dorsum beneath the second discal, as well as an almost marginal row of blackish dots, sometimes rather large, along the posterior half of the costa and termen. The hindwings are grey, varying in intensity.
