= Holcopogon tucki =

Scientific classification
- Kingdom: Animalia
- Phylum: Arthropoda
- Class: Insecta
- Order: Lepidoptera
- Family: Autostichidae
- Genus: Holcopogon
- Species: H. tucki

Binomial name
- Holcopogon tucki Vives Moreno, 1999

Species of moth

Holcopogon tucki is a moth in the family Autostichidae. It was described by Vives Moreno in 1999. It is found in South Africa.
