= Autosticha authaema =

Scientific classification
- Kingdom: Animalia
- Phylum: Arthropoda
- Clade: Pancrustacea
- Class: Insecta
- Order: Lepidoptera
- Family: Autostichidae
- Genus: Autosticha
- Species: A. authaema

Binomial name
- Autosticha authaema (Meyrick, 1906)

Synonyms
- Epicoenia authaema Meyrick, 1906

Species of moth

Autosticha authaema is a moth in the family Autostichidae. It was described by Edward Meyrick in 1906. It is found in Sri Lanka.

The wingspan is 12–13 mm. The forewings are pale ochreous, irrorated (sprinkled) with fuscous and dark fuscous. The stigmata are rather large and dark fuscous, with the plical nearly beneath the first discal. There is a small dark fuscous pre-tornal spot and an almost marginal series of dark fuscous dots along the posterior half of the costa and termen. The hindwings are grey, darker in females.

The larvae construct heliciform cases on the surface of moss-covered rocks. The cases consist of a gradually dilated gallery coiled in a flat rounded spiral, and are composed of silk closely covered with grains of sand and fragments of lichens.
