= Autosticha chernetis =

Scientific classification
- Kingdom: Animalia
- Phylum: Arthropoda
- Clade: Pancrustacea
- Class: Insecta
- Order: Lepidoptera
- Family: Autostichidae
- Genus: Autosticha
- Species: A. chernetis

Binomial name
- Autosticha chernetis (Meyrick, 1906)

Synonyms
- Epicoenia chernetis Meyrick, 1906

Species of moth

Autosticha chernetis is a moth in the family Autostichidae. It was described by Edward Meyrick in 1906. It is found in Sri Lanka.

The wingspan is 16–17 mm. The forewings are whitish ochreous, tinged with fuscous and irrorated (sprinkled) with dark fuscous and a dark fuscous dot on the base of the costa, followed by an undefined whitish-ochreous dot. The discal stigmata are large, with the plical beneath the first discal. There is a small pre-tornal spot of dark fuscous suffusion and an almost marginal row of dark fuscous or blackish dots along the posterior portion of the costa and termen. The hindwings are grey.

The larvae feed in galleries on the surface of moss-covered rocks, and pupating in an enlarged chamber. The galleries are composed of silk covered with grains of sand and fragments of lichen, moss, and incidental refuse.
