= Autosticha emmetra =

Scientific classification
- Kingdom: Animalia
- Phylum: Arthropoda
- Clade: Pancrustacea
- Class: Insecta
- Order: Lepidoptera
- Family: Autostichidae
- Genus: Autosticha
- Species: A. emmetra

Binomial name
- Autosticha emmetra Meyrick, 1921

Species of moth

Autosticha emmetra is a moth in the family Autostichidae. It was described by Edward Meyrick in 1921. It is found in Zimbabwe.

The wingspan is about 12 mm. The forewings are light fuscous irrorated (sprinkled) with rather dark fuscous and with a faint violet tinge. The stigmata are dark fuscous, the plical rather obliquely before the first discal, a cloudy dark fuscous dot above the dorsum obliquely before the second discal. The hindwings are light grey.
