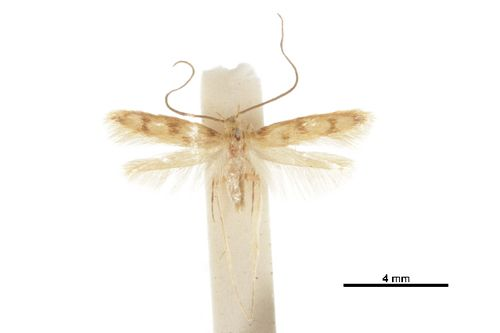

Scientific classification
- Kingdom: Animalia
- Phylum: Arthropoda
- Clade: Pancrustacea
- Class: Insecta
- Order: Lepidoptera
- Family: Autostichidae
- Subfamily: Holcopogoninae
- Genus: Oecia; Walsingham, 1897
- Species: O. oecophila

Binomial name
- Oecia oecophila (Staudinger, 1876)

Synonyms
- Macroceras Staudinger, 1876; Macroceras oecophila Staudinger, 1876; Oecia maculata Walsingham, 1897; Apatema husadeli Rebel, 1910

= Oecia =

Genus of moths

Oecia is a monotypic moth genus first described by Lord Walsingham in 1897. It is in the family Autostichidae. Its only species, Oecia oecophila, described by Otto Staudinger in 1876, is widely distributed in the West Indies, Central America and South America, southern Europe, Japan, northern and southern Africa, Malaya, Java, Indonesia, Australia and Hawaii. It has been widely dispersed by commerce.

The wingspan is about 10 mm for males and 13 mm for females.

The larvae are coprophagous and detritophagous.
