= Trichloma =

Scientific classification
- Kingdom: Animalia
- Phylum: Arthropoda
- Class: Insecta
- Order: Lepidoptera
- Family: Autostichidae
- Subfamily: Autostichinae
- Genus: Trichloma; Lower, 1902
- Species: T. asbolophora

Binomial name
- Trichloma asbolophora Lower, 1902

Genus of moths

Trichloma is a moth genus in the subfamily Autostichinae. It contains the species Trichloma asbolophora, which is found in Australia, where it has been recorded from Victoria.

The wingspan is 20–45 mm (0.79–1.77 in). The forewings are dark fuscous, mixed with, whitish scales, more or less streaked with short black streaks, especially in the middle. The veins towards the termen are more or less outlined with black and the extreme costal edge is whitish throughout. There is a short, somewhat obscure, whitish mark below the middle, at two-thirds from the base, posteriorly edged by its own width of black. There is an interrupted black line along the termen. The hindwings are dark ochreous-fuscous.

The larvae feed on Casuarina species. They tunnel into the straight branches, forming a silky covering over the aperture.
