= Ptochoryctis ochrograpta =

Scientific classification
- Domain: Eukaryota
- Kingdom: Animalia
- Phylum: Arthropoda
- Class: Insecta
- Order: Lepidoptera
- Family: Autostichidae
- Genus: Ptochoryctis
- Species: P. ochrograpta

Binomial name
- Ptochoryctis ochrograpta Meyrick, 1923

Species of moth

Ptochoryctis ochrograpta is a moth in the family Autostichidae. It was described by Edward Meyrick in 1923. It is found in Myanmar.

The wingspan is about 22 mm. The forewings are shining white with an ochreous line from three-fourths of the costa to the tornus, obtusely angulated in the middle. There is an ochreous marginal line around the apical part of the costa, and faint dots on the termen. The hindwings are white.
