= Ischnodoris =

Scientific classification
- Kingdom: Animalia
- Phylum: Arthropoda
- Class: Insecta
- Order: Lepidoptera
- Family: Gelechiidae
- Genus: Ischnodoris; Meyrick, 1911

Genus of moths

Ischnodoris is a moth genus in the subfamily Autostichinae.

== Species ==
- Ischnodoris sigalota Meyrick, 1911
- Ischnodoris chlorosperma Meyrick, 1929
