= Holcopogon bubulcellus =

Scientific classification
- Kingdom: Animalia
- Phylum: Arthropoda
- Class: Insecta
- Order: Lepidoptera
- Family: Autostichidae
- Genus: Holcopogon
- Species: H. bubulcellus

Binomial name
- Holcopogon bubulcellus (Staudinger, 1859)

Synonyms
- Hypsolophus bubulcellus Staudinger, 1859; Cyrnia barbata Walsingham, 1900; Hypsolophus pulverellus Constant, 1865; Holcopogon helveolellus Staudinger, 1879; Scythris infrascripta Turati, 1930

Species of moth

Holcopogon bubulcellus is a moth of the family Autostichidae. It is found in southern Europe (from France and the Iberian Peninsula east to southern Russia) and North Africa.

The wingspan is 13–18 mm. The forewings are yellowish grey, sprinkled with blackish scales.

== Subspecies ==
- Holcopogon bubulcellus bubulcellus
- Holcopogon bubulcellus helveolellus Staudinger, 1879
