= Autosticha crocothicta =

Scientific classification
- Kingdom: Animalia
- Phylum: Arthropoda
- Clade: Pancrustacea
- Class: Insecta
- Order: Lepidoptera
- Family: Autostichidae
- Genus: Autosticha
- Species: A. crocothicta

Binomial name
- Autosticha crocothicta Meyrick, 1916

Species of moth

Autosticha crocothicta is a moth in the family Autostichidae. It was described by Edward Meyrick in 1916. It is found in Sri Lanka.

The wingspan is about 16 mm. The forewings are violet fuscous with the extreme costal edge pale ochreous yellowish from one-fourth to three-fourths. The stigmata are blackish, the plical slightly before the first discal. There is a blackish dot on the dorsum beneath the second discal, edged posteriorly with pale yellowish. An almost marginal row of cloudy blackish dots is found around the apical fifth of the costa and termen. The hindwings are grey, darker on the veins and posteriorly.
