= Hesperesta =

Scientific classification
- Kingdom: Animalia
- Phylum: Arthropoda
- Clade: Pancrustacea
- Class: Insecta
- Order: Lepidoptera
- Family: Autostichidae
- Subfamily: Holcopogoninae
- Genus: Hesperesta; Gozmány, 1978

Genus of moths

Hesperesta is a moth genus in the family Autostichidae.

== Species ==
- Hesperesta alicantella Derra, 2008
- Hesperesta arabica Gozmány, 2000
- Hesperesta geminella (Chrétien, 1915)
- Hesperesta hartigi (Turati, 1934)
- Hesperesta rhyodes (Meyrick, 1909)
