= Charadraula cassandra =

Scientific classification
- Kingdom: Animalia
- Phylum: Arthropoda
- Clade: Pancrustacea
- Class: Insecta
- Order: Lepidoptera
- Family: Autostichidae
- Genus: Charadraula
- Species: C. cassandra

Binomial name
- Charadraula cassandra Gozmány, 1967

Species of moth

Charadraula cassandra is a moth of the family Autostichidae. It is found in Romania and on Crete and Cyprus, as well as in Syria.
