= Autosticha dianeura =

Scientific classification
- Kingdom: Animalia
- Phylum: Arthropoda
- Clade: Pancrustacea
- Class: Insecta
- Order: Lepidoptera
- Family: Autostichidae
- Genus: Autosticha
- Species: A. dianeura

Binomial name
- Autosticha dianeura Meyrick, 1939

Species of moth

Autosticha dianeura is a moth in the family Autostichidae. It was described by Edward Meyrick in 1939. It is found on Fiji.
