= Autosticha pelaea =

Scientific classification
- Kingdom: Animalia
- Phylum: Arthropoda
- Clade: Pancrustacea
- Class: Insecta
- Order: Lepidoptera
- Family: Autostichidae
- Genus: Autosticha
- Species: A. pelaea

Binomial name
- Autosticha pelaea Meyrick, 1908

Species of moth

Autosticha pelaea is a moth in the family Autostichidae. It was described by Edward Meyrick in 1908. It is found in Sri Lanka.

The wingspan is 10–11 mm. The forewings are deep ochreous yellow, with a few scattered black scales. There are small blackish dots at the base of the costa and dorsum. There are elongate blackish spots on the costa about one-fifth and the middle. The stigmata are large and blackish, the plical rather obliquely before first discal, preceded by more or less black suffusion on the fold. There is an almost marginal row of blackish dots around the posterior part of the costa and termen to the dorsum before the tornus. The hindwings are grey.
