= Autosticha sichunica =

Scientific classification
- Kingdom: Animalia
- Phylum: Arthropoda
- Clade: Pancrustacea
- Class: Insecta
- Order: Lepidoptera
- Family: Autostichidae
- Genus: Autosticha
- Species: A. sichunica

Binomial name
- Autosticha sichunica Park & C. S. Wu, 2003

Species of moth

Autosticha sichunica is a moth in the family Autostichidae. It was described by Kyu-Tek Park and Chun-Sheng Wu in 2003. It is found in the Chinese provinces of Sichuan, Hainan and Fujian.

== Description ==
The wingspan of the moth is 14–15 mm.
