= Heringita =

Scientific classification
- Kingdom: Animalia
- Phylum: Arthropoda
- Class: Insecta
- Order: Lepidoptera
- Family: Autostichidae
- Subfamily: Holcopogoninae
- Genus: Heringita; Agenjo, 1953

Synonyms
- Gigantoletria Gozmany, 1963

Genus of moths

Heringita is a moth genus in the family Autostichidae.

== Species ==
- Heringita heringi Agenjo, 1953
- Heringita amseli (Gozmány, 1954)
- Heringita dentulata (Gozmány, 1967)
- Heringita perarmata (Gozmány, 2000)
