= Heringita heringi =

Scientific classification
- Kingdom: Animalia
- Phylum: Arthropoda
- Class: Insecta
- Order: Lepidoptera
- Family: Autostichidae
- Genus: Heringita
- Species: H. heringi

Binomial name
- Heringita heringi Agenjo, 1953

Species of moth

Heringita heringi is a moth of the family Autostichidae. It is found on the Balearic Islands in the Mediterranean and mainland Spain.
