= Holcopogon cinerascens =

Scientific classification
- Domain: Eukaryota
- Kingdom: Animalia
- Phylum: Arthropoda
- Class: Insecta
- Order: Lepidoptera
- Family: Autostichidae
- Genus: Holcopogon
- Species: H. cinerascens

Binomial name
- Holcopogon cinerascens Turati, 1926

Species of moth

Holcopogon cinerascens is a moth in the family Autostichidae. It was described by Turati in 1926. It is found in Libya.
