= Ptochoryctis anguillaris =

Scientific classification
- Domain: Eukaryota
- Kingdom: Animalia
- Phylum: Arthropoda
- Class: Insecta
- Order: Lepidoptera
- Family: Autostichidae
- Genus: Ptochoryctis
- Species: P. anguillaris

Binomial name
- Ptochoryctis anguillaris Meyrick, 1914

Species of moth

Ptochoryctis anguillaris is a moth in the family Autostichidae. It was described by Edward Meyrick in 1914. It is found in Sri Lanka.

The wingspan is 12–15 mm. The forewings are silvery white with a curved dark-fuscous streak running from two-thirds of the costa to near the apex. There is a dark fuscous streak running along the termen from near beneath the apex of the preceding to the tornus, where it is expanded into an oblique bilobed fasciaform mark reaching to the middle of the disc. The hindwings are ochreous white.
