= Cyllaraxis =

Scientific classification
- Kingdom: Animalia
- Phylum: Arthropoda
- Clade: Pancrustacea
- Class: Insecta
- Order: Lepidoptera
- Family: Autostichidae
- Subfamily: Holcopogoninae
- Genus: Cyllaraxis; Gozmány in Gaedike, 2000
- Species: C. cambyses

Binomial name
- Cyllaraxis cambyses Gozmány, 2000

Genus of moths

Cyllaraxis is a moth genus in the family Autostichidae. It contains the species Cyllaraxis cambyses, which is found in Iran.
