= Autosticha ansata =

Scientific classification
- Kingdom: Animalia
- Phylum: Arthropoda
- Clade: Pancrustacea
- Class: Insecta
- Order: Lepidoptera
- Family: Autostichidae
- Genus: Autosticha
- Species: A. ansata

Binomial name
- Autosticha ansata Meyrick, 1931

Species of moth

Autosticha ansata is a moth in the family Autostichidae. It was described by Edward Meyrick in 1931. It is found in Chennai, India.
