= Deroxena conioleuca =

Scientific classification
- Kingdom: Animalia
- Phylum: Arthropoda
- Class: Insecta
- Order: Lepidoptera
- Family: Autostichidae
- Genus: Deroxena
- Species: D. conioleuca

Binomial name
- Deroxena conioleuca Meyrick, 1926

Species of moth

Deroxena conioleuca is a moth in the family Autostichidae. It was described by Edward Meyrick in 1926. It is found in Kazakhstan (Uralsk).

== Features ==
Its wingspan is 14–16 mm. The forewings are ochreous whitish irrorated (sprinkled) with fuscous. The discal stigmata are cloudy, fuscous, with a more or less clear ochreous-whitish streak connecting them. The hindwings are white, the veins on the posterior half and terminal edge greyish.
