= Hesperesta arabica =

Scientific classification
- Kingdom: Animalia
- Phylum: Arthropoda
- Clade: Pancrustacea
- Class: Insecta
- Order: Lepidoptera
- Family: Autostichidae
- Genus: Hesperesta
- Species: H. arabica

Binomial name
- Hesperesta arabica Gozmány, 2000

Species of moth

Hesperesta arabica is a moth in the family Autostichidae. It was described by László Anthony Gozmány in 2000. It is found in Saudi Arabia and Yemen.
