= Diophila claricoma =

Scientific classification
- Kingdom: Animalia
- Phylum: Arthropoda
- Class: Insecta
- Order: Lepidoptera
- Family: Autostichidae
- Genus: Diophila
- Species: D. claricoma

Binomial name
- Diophila claricoma Meyrick, 1937

Species of moth

Diophila claricoma is a moth in the family Autostichidae. It is found in Uganda.

The wingspan is about 12 mm.
