= Autosticha guttulata =

Scientific classification
- Kingdom: Animalia
- Phylum: Arthropoda
- Clade: Pancrustacea
- Class: Insecta
- Order: Lepidoptera
- Family: Autostichidae
- Genus: Autosticha
- Species: A. guttulata

Binomial name
- Autosticha guttulata Meyrick, 1925

Species of moth

Autosticha guttulata is a moth in the family Autostichidae. It was described by Edward Meyrick in 1925. It is found in China.
