= Lasiodictis =

Scientific classification
- Kingdom: Animalia
- Phylum: Arthropoda
- Class: Insecta
- Order: Lepidoptera
- Family: Autostichidae
- Subfamily: Autostichinae
- Genus: Lasiodictis; Meyrick, 1912
- Species: L. melistoma

Binomial name
- Lasiodictis melistoma Meyrick, 1912

Genus of moths

Lasiodictis is a moth genus in the subfamily Autostichinae. It contains the species Lasiodictis melistoma, which is found in Assam, India.

The wingspan is 16–18 mm. The forewings are dark fuscous, with a faint purplish tinge. The hindwings are blackish-fuscous.
