= Autosticha nothriforme =

Scientific classification
- Kingdom: Animalia
- Phylum: Arthropoda
- Clade: Pancrustacea
- Class: Insecta
- Order: Lepidoptera
- Family: Autostichidae
- Genus: Autosticha
- Species: A. nothriforme

Binomial name
- Autosticha nothriforme (Walsingham, 1897)

Synonyms
- Epicharma nothriforme Walsingham, 1897

Species of moth

Autosticha nothriforme is a moth in the family Autostichidae. It was described by Walsingham in 1897. It is found in the Central African Republic.

The wingspan is about 23 mm. The forewings are pale stone-ochreous with three black spots, one on the middle of the fold, one on the middle of the disc above and beyond it, the third at the end of the cell slightly below the line of the previous one. A very faint shade of greyish brown on the apical portion of the wing is interrupted by a pale waved fasciaform mark which extends from the commencement of the costal cilia, bulging outwards and reverting to the dorsum before the tornus. A few ill-defined greyish brown spots are found around the apex and termen. The hindwings are grey.
