= Ptochoryctis inviolata =

Scientific classification
- Domain: Eukaryota
- Kingdom: Animalia
- Phylum: Arthropoda
- Class: Insecta
- Order: Lepidoptera
- Family: Autostichidae
- Genus: Ptochoryctis
- Species: P. inviolata

Binomial name
- Ptochoryctis inviolata Meyrick, 1925

Species of moth

Ptochoryctis inviolata is a moth in the family Autostichidae. It was described by Edward Meyrick in 1925. It is found in India (Bombay).

The wingspan is about 20 mm. The forewings are glossy white with the costal edge blackish towards the base and with three or four minute blackish specks before the lower part of the termen. The hindwings are whitish.
