= Autosticha symmetra =

Scientific classification
- Kingdom: Animalia
- Phylum: Arthropoda
- Clade: Pancrustacea
- Class: Insecta
- Order: Lepidoptera
- Family: Autostichidae
- Genus: Autosticha
- Species: A. symmetra

Binomial name
- Autosticha symmetra (Turner, 1919)

Synonyms
- Prosomura symmetra Turner, 1919

Species of moth

Autosticha symmetra is a moth in the family Autostichidae. It was described by Turner in 1919. It is found in Australia, where it has been recorded from Queensland.

The wingspan is 8–9 mm. The forewings are pale brownish-ochreous with fuscous irroration and markings and a subcostal spot near the base. The first discal is found at one-third, the plical shortly before the first discal, the second discal at two-thirds. There is a dot on the mid-costa, a second at two-thirds and two more between this and the apex. There is also a series of terminal dots sometimes not quite on the margin. The hindwings are grey-whitish.
