= Protobathra coenotypa =

Scientific classification
- Kingdom: Animalia
- Phylum: Arthropoda
- Class: Insecta
- Order: Lepidoptera
- Family: Autostichidae
- Genus: Protobathra
- Species: P. coenotypa

Binomial name
- Protobathra coenotypa Meyrick, 1918

Synonyms
- Rotobathra coenotypa

Species of moth

Protobathra coenotypa is a moth in the family Autostichidae. It was described by Edward Meyrick in 1918. It is found in Sri Lanka.

The wingspan is 14–17 mm. The forewings are greyish ochreous more or less irrorated (sprinkled) with grey, the costal edge whitish ochreous. There is a dark fuscous dot on the base of the costa and the stigmata are dark fuscous, the plical beneath the first discal. There is a marginal series of cloudy dark fuscous dots around the posterior part of the costa and termen to before the tornus. The hindwings are light grey.
