= Anaptilora haplospila =

Scientific classification
- Domain: Eukaryota
- Kingdom: Animalia
- Phylum: Arthropoda
- Class: Insecta
- Order: Lepidoptera
- Family: Autostichidae
- Genus: Anaptilora
- Species: A. haplospila

Binomial name
- Anaptilora haplospila Turner, 1919

Species of moth

Anaptilora haplospila is a moth in the family Gelechiidae. It was described by Turner in 1919. It is found in Australia, where it has been recorded from Queensland.

The wingspan is 12–13 mm. The forewings are ochreous-whitish with blackish dots. The first discal is found before the middle, the second at two-thirds, and the plical before the first discal. There are also some terminal dots. The hindwings are grey-whitish.
