= Anaptilora ephelotis =

Scientific classification
- Kingdom: Animalia
- Phylum: Arthropoda
- Class: Insecta
- Order: Lepidoptera
- Family: Autostichidae
- Genus: Anaptilora
- Species: A. ephelotis

Binomial name
- Anaptilora ephelotis Meyrick, 1916

Species of moth

Anaptilora ephelotis is a moth in the family Gelechiidae. It was described by Edward Meyrick in 1916. It is found in Australia, where it has been recorded from the Northern Territory.

The wingspan is about 13 mm. The forewings are whitish ochreous, with a few scattered dark fuscous specks and a black dot towards the base above the middle. The stigmata is black, with the plical rather obliquely beyond the first discal and the second discal rather large. There are faint traces of a fuscous subterminal line and there is a marginal series of small indistinct dark fuscous dots round the posterior part of the costa and termen. The hindwings have the paler part of the termen somewhat oblique and is pale whitish-ochreous, tinged with grey posteriorly.
