= Autosticha chishuiensis =

Scientific classification
- Kingdom: Animalia
- Phylum: Arthropoda
- Clade: Pancrustacea
- Class: Insecta
- Order: Lepidoptera
- Family: Autostichidae
- Genus: Autosticha
- Species: A. chishuiensis

Binomial name
- Autosticha chishuiensis S.X. Wang, 2004

Species of moth

Autosticha chishuiensis is a moth in the family Autostichidae. It was described by S.X. Wang in 2004. It is found in China (Guizhou).
