= Autosticha deductella =

Scientific classification
- Kingdom: Animalia
- Phylum: Arthropoda
- Clade: Pancrustacea
- Class: Insecta
- Order: Lepidoptera
- Family: Autostichidae
- Genus: Autosticha
- Species: A. deductella

Binomial name
- Autosticha deductella (Walker, 1864)

Synonyms
- Gelechia deductella Walker, 1864

Species of moth

Autosticha deductella is a moth in the Autostichidae family. It was described by Francis Walker in 1864 and found in Sri Lanka.

Adults are brown, the forewings without markings, rounded at the tips, and the exterior border almost straight, slightly oblique.
