= Autosticha stagmatopis =

Scientific classification
- Kingdom: Animalia
- Phylum: Arthropoda
- Clade: Pancrustacea
- Class: Insecta
- Order: Lepidoptera
- Family: Autostichidae
- Genus: Autosticha
- Species: A. stagmatopis

Binomial name
- Autosticha stagmatopis Meyrick, 1923

Species of moth

Autosticha stagmatopis is a moth in the family Autostichidae. It was described by Edward Meyrick in 1923. It is found in southern India.

The wingspan is 14–16 mm. The forewings are light fuscous somewhat whitish speckled. The stigmata are large, cloudy, dark fuscous, the plical beneath the first discal. There is a pre-marginal series of cloudy groups of dark fuscous scales around the posterior part of the costa and termen to beneath the second discal. The hindwings are grey.
