= Ptochoryctis chalazopa =

Scientific classification
- Domain: Eukaryota
- Kingdom: Animalia
- Phylum: Arthropoda
- Class: Insecta
- Order: Lepidoptera
- Family: Autostichidae
- Genus: Ptochoryctis
- Species: P. chalazopa

Binomial name
- Ptochoryctis chalazopa Meyrick, 1920

Species of moth

Ptochoryctis chalazopa is a moth in the family Autostichidae. It was described by Edward Meyrick in 1920. It is found on Java in Indonesia.

The wingspan is about 16 mm. The forewings are white with a broad band of black irroration (sprinkling) suffused with pale grey rising obliquely from the dorsum near the base and running through the disc above the middle to a large roundish blotch occupying most of the wing beyond the cell but not extending to the margins, posteriorly suffused blackish. There is a triangular blackish spot on the dorsum about the middle, and two rather inwards-oblique streaks of blackish irroration between this and the posterior blotch. There is also a terminal series of small groups of black scales. The hindwings are grey.
