= Encrasima reversa =

Scientific classification
- Kingdom: Animalia
- Phylum: Arthropoda
- Class: Insecta
- Order: Lepidoptera
- Family: Autostichidae
- Genus: Encrasima
- Species: E. reversa

Binomial name
- Encrasima reversa Meyrick, 1916

Species of moth

Encrasima reversa is a moth in the family Autostichidae. It was described by Edward Meyrick in 1916. It is found in Sri Lanka.

The wingspan is 22–26 mm. The forewings are ochreous orange yellowish, sometimes wholly tinged with fuscous. The stigmata are black, the plical rather before the first discal. There is a cloudy grey dot on the dorsum beneath the second discal. An almost marginal row of black dots is found around the posterior part of the costa and termen. The hindwings are rather dark grey.
