= Holcopogon robustus =

Scientific classification
- Domain: Eukaryota
- Kingdom: Animalia
- Phylum: Arthropoda
- Class: Insecta
- Order: Lepidoptera
- Family: Autostichidae
- Genus: Holcopogon
- Species: H. robustus

Binomial name
- Holcopogon robustus (Butler, 1883)

Synonyms
- Ypsolophus robustus Butler, 1883; Epistomotis penessa Meyrick, 1906

Species of moth

Holcopogon robustus is a moth in the family Autostichidae. It was described by Arthur Gardiner Butler in 1883. It is found in Sri Lanka.

The wingspan is 14–20 mm. The forewings are brownish ochreous or fuscous, irrorated (speckled) with white. The stigmata are dark fuscous, suffused, the discal more or less distinct, the plical linear, indistinct, very obliquely beyond the first discal. The hindwings are fuscous whitish.
