= Autosticha truncicola =

Scientific classification
- Kingdom: Animalia
- Phylum: Arthropoda
- Clade: Pancrustacea
- Class: Insecta
- Order: Lepidoptera
- Family: Autostichidae
- Genus: Autosticha
- Species: A. truncicola

Binomial name
- Autosticha truncicola Ueda, 1997

Species of moth

Autosticha truncicola is a moth in the family Autostichidae. It was described by Ueda in 1997. It is found in China, Korea and Japan (Honshu, Kyushu).

The wingspan is 16–18 mm. Adults are similar to Autosticha opaca, but can be distinguished by the male and female genitalia.

The larvae feed on Sophora japonica, Robinica pseudoacacia and Prunus mume.
