= Heringita amseli =

Scientific classification
- Kingdom: Animalia
- Phylum: Arthropoda
- Clade: Pancrustacea
- Class: Insecta
- Order: Lepidoptera
- Family: Autostichidae
- Genus: Heringita
- Species: H. amseli

Binomial name
- Heringita amseli (Gozmány, 1954)

Synonyms
- Bubulcellodes amseli Gozmány, 1954; Gigantoletria amselina Gozmány, 1967; Gigantoletria amseli Gozmány, 1963

Species of moth

Heringita amseli is a moth in the family Autostichidae. It was described by László Anthony Gozmány in 1954. It is found in Bahrain, Saudi Arabia, Afghanistan and Iran.
