= Demiophila =

Scientific classification
- Kingdom: Animalia
- Phylum: Arthropoda
- Class: Insecta
- Order: Lepidoptera
- Family: Autostichidae
- Subfamily: Autostichinae
- Genus: Demiophila; Meyrick, 1906
- Species: D. psaphara

Binomial name
- Demiophila psaphara Meyrick, 1906

Genus of moths

Demiophila is a genus of moths in the subfamily Autostichinae. It contains the species Demiophila psaphara, which is found in Sri Lanka.

The wingspan is 17–21 mm. The forewings are whitish-ochreous, more or less sprinkled with fuscous and with a dark fuscous dot on the base of the costa, and another beneath it. The stigmata are moderate, dark fuscous, the plical elongate and often small, obliquely beyond the first discal. There is an almost marginal series of dark fuscous dots around the termen and apical portion of the costa. The hindwings are pale whitish-ochreous-grey or whitish-ochreous.
