= Ptochoryctis alma =

Scientific classification
- Domain: Eukaryota
- Kingdom: Animalia
- Phylum: Arthropoda
- Class: Insecta
- Order: Lepidoptera
- Family: Autostichidae
- Genus: Ptochoryctis
- Species: P. alma

Binomial name
- Ptochoryctis alma (Meyrick, 1908)

Synonyms
- Amorboea alma Meyrick, 1908

Species of moth

Ptochoryctis alma is a moth in the family Autostichidae. It was described by Edward Meyrick in 1908. It is found southern India.

The wingspan is about 24 mm. The forewings are light yellow ochreous and the hindwings are light ochreous yellowish.
