= Autosticha aspasta =

Scientific classification
- Kingdom: Animalia
- Phylum: Arthropoda
- Clade: Pancrustacea
- Class: Insecta
- Order: Lepidoptera
- Family: Autostichidae
- Genus: Autosticha
- Species: A. aspasta

Binomial name
- Autosticha aspasta Meyrick, 1908

Species of moth

Autosticha aspasta is a moth in the family Autostichidae. It was described by Edward Meyrick in 1908. It is found in Sri Lanka.

The wingspan is 13–16 mm. The forewings are clear deep ochreous yellow with blackish dots on the base of the costa and dorsum. The stigmata are large and black, the plical rather obliquely before the first discal. There is an almost marginal row of large black dots along the posterior third of the costa and termen to the dorsum before the tornus. The hindwings are grey.
