= Encrasima xanthoclista =

Scientific classification
- Kingdom: Animalia
- Phylum: Arthropoda
- Class: Insecta
- Order: Lepidoptera
- Family: Autostichidae
- Genus: Encrasima
- Species: E. xanthoclista

Binomial name
- Encrasima xanthoclista Meyrick, 1923

Species of moth

Encrasima xanthoclista is a moth in the family Autostichidae. It was described by Edward Meyrick in 1923. It is found in Sri Lanka.

The wingspan is about 17 mm. The forewings are grey brownish, the costa slenderly ochreous yellow from the base to near the apex. The stigmata are moderate and black, the plical slightly before the first discal. There is a pre-marginal series of cloudy-blackish dots around the posterior part of the costa and termen, on the termen obscured in a streak of grey suffusion. The hindwings are grey.
