= Ischnodoris chlorosperma =

Scientific classification
- Domain: Eukaryota
- Kingdom: Animalia
- Phylum: Arthropoda
- Class: Insecta
- Order: Lepidoptera
- Family: Gelechiidae
- Genus: Ischnodoris
- Species: I. chlorosperma

Binomial name
- Ischnodoris chlorosperma Meyrick, 1929

Species of moth

Ischnodoris chlorosperma is a moth in the family Autostichidae. It was described by Edward Meyrick in 1929. It is found in Sri Lanka.

The wingspan is about 17 mm. The forewings are fuscous mixed darker with a pale ochreous median basal dot. The hindwings are pale grey.
