= Hesperesta rhyodes =

Scientific classification
- Kingdom: Animalia
- Phylum: Arthropoda
- Class: Insecta
- Order: Lepidoptera
- Family: Autostichidae
- Genus: Hesperesta
- Species: H. rhyodes

Binomial name
- Hesperesta rhyodes (Meyrick, 1909)

Synonyms
- Nothris rhyodes Meyrick, 1909; Epistomotis amphicentra Meyrick, 1913

Species of moth

Hesperesta rhyodes is a moth in the family Autostichidae. It was described by Edward Meyrick in 1909. It is found in Namibia and Gauteng, South Africa.

The wingspan is about 17 mm. The forewings are light fuscous, suffusedly mixed throughout with whitish and with the veins in the disk and two or three towards the costa posteriorly partially indicated by a series of scattered blackish scales. There is a similar series along the termen and posterior part of the costa. The hindwings are light grey.
