= Anaptilora basiphaea =

Scientific classification
- Domain: Eukaryota
- Kingdom: Animalia
- Phylum: Arthropoda
- Class: Insecta
- Order: Lepidoptera
- Family: Autostichidae
- Genus: Anaptilora
- Species: A. basiphaea

Binomial name
- Anaptilora basiphaea Turner, 1919

Synonyms
- Hemiarcha basipercna Turner, 1933

Species of moth

Anaptilora basiphaea is a moth in the family Gelechiidae. It was described by Turner in 1919. It is found in Australia, where it has been recorded from Queensland, the Northern Territory and South Australia.

The wingspan is about 18 mm. The forewings are ochreous-whitish, with a few scattered fuscous scales. The markings are fuscous and with a narrow basal fascia slightly produced on the dorsum. There are discal dots at one-third and two-thirds, with the plical slightly beyond the first discal. There is a terminal series of dots. The hindwings are whitish.
