= Arragonia punctivitella =

Scientific classification
- Domain: Eukaryota
- Kingdom: Animalia
- Phylum: Arthropoda
- Class: Insecta
- Order: Lepidoptera
- Family: Autostichidae
- Genus: Arragonia
- Species: A. punctivitella

Binomial name
- Arragonia punctivitella (Zerny, 1927)

Synonyms
- Holcopogon punctivitella Zerny, 1927

Species of moth

Arragonia punctivitella is a moth of the family Autostichidae. It is found in Portugal and Spain.
