= Autosticha solita =

Scientific classification
- Kingdom: Animalia
- Phylum: Arthropoda
- Clade: Pancrustacea
- Class: Insecta
- Order: Lepidoptera
- Family: Autostichidae
- Genus: Autosticha
- Species: A. solita

Binomial name
- Autosticha solita (Meyrick, 1923)

Synonyms
- Pachnistis solita Meyrick, 1923

Species of moth

Autosticha solita is a moth in the family Autostichidae. It was described by Edward Meyrick in 1923. It is found on Fiji.

The wingspan is about 16 mm. The forewings are light brownish ochreous or whitish ochreous speckled fuscous with a fuscous or ferruginous dot near the dorsum at the base. The stigmata are small, dark fuscous or ferruginous, the plical rather before the first discal. There is an almost marginal series of dark fuscous or ferruginous dots around the posterior part of the costa and termen. The hindwings are grey, the subdorsal hairs forming a long expansible ochreous-whitish tuft.
