= Autosticha exemplaris =

Scientific classification
- Kingdom: Animalia
- Phylum: Arthropoda
- Clade: Pancrustacea
- Class: Insecta
- Order: Lepidoptera
- Family: Autostichidae
- Genus: Autosticha
- Species: A. exemplaris

Binomial name
- Autosticha exemplaris Meyrick, 1916

Species of moth

Autosticha exemplaris is a moth in the family Autostichidae. It was described by Edward Meyrick in 1916. It is found in southern India.

The wingspan is about 13 mm. The forewings are pale greyish ochreous irrorated (sprinkled) with rather dark fuscous and with a blackish dot on the base of the costa. The stigmata are blackish, the plical beneath the first discal, the second discal rather large, a dark fuscous streak from the dorsum somewhat beyond this nearly or quite reaching it. There is an almost marginal row of cloudy dark fuscous dots around the posterior part of the costa and termen. The hindwings are light grey.
