= Encrasima insularis =

Scientific classification
- Domain: Eukaryota
- Kingdom: Animalia
- Phylum: Arthropoda
- Class: Insecta
- Order: Lepidoptera
- Family: Autostichidae
- Genus: Encrasima
- Species: E. insularis

Binomial name
- Encrasima insularis (Butler, 1880)

Synonyms
- Gelechia insularis Butler, 1880

Species of moth

Encrasima insularis is a moth in the family Autostichidae. It was described by Arthur Gardiner Butler in 1880. It is found on Madagascar.

Adults are dark fuliginous brown, the forewings crossed before the middle by a broad, pale-edged, golden-ochreous belt, which does not quite reach the costal margin. There is a small, ocelloid, black-brown spot, margined with stramineous (straw colour), beyond the cell, followed immediately by an externally blackish-bordered, curved, golden-ochreous discal band. The apex and outer margin are whitish brown and the marginal line is black. The hindwings are paler than the forewings and without markings.
