= Ptochoryctis =

Scientific classification
- Kingdom: Animalia
- Phylum: Arthropoda
- Class: Insecta
- Order: Lepidoptera
- Family: Autostichidae
- Subfamily: Autostichinae
- Genus: Ptochoryctis; Meyrick, 1894

Genus of moths

Ptochoryctis is a moth genus in the subfamily Autostichinae.

== Species ==
- Ptochoryctis acrosticta Meyrick, 1906
- Ptochoryctis alma (Meyrick, 1908)
- Ptochoryctis anguillaris Meyrick, 1914
- Ptochoryctis chalazopa Meyrick, 1920
- Ptochoryctis eremopa Meyrick, 1894
- Ptochoryctis galbanea (Meyrick, 1914)
- Ptochoryctis inviolata Meyrick, 1925
- Ptochoryctis ochrograpta Meyrick, 1923
- Ptochoryctis perigramma Meyrick, 1926
- Ptochoryctis scionota Meyrick, 1906
- Ptochoryctis simbleuta Meyrick, 1907
