= Autosticha demotica =

Scientific classification
- Kingdom: Animalia
- Phylum: Arthropoda
- Clade: Pancrustacea
- Class: Insecta
- Order: Lepidoptera
- Family: Autostichidae
- Genus: Autosticha
- Species: A. demotica

Binomial name
- Autosticha demotica Meyrick, 1908

Species of moth

Autosticha demotica is a moth in the family Autostichidae. It was described by Edward Meyrick in 1908. It is found in Sri Lanka.

The wingspan is 13–18 mm. The forewings are light fuscous or greyish ochreous with a dark fuscous dot on the base of the costa. The stigmata are very small and dark fuscous, the discal stigmata approximated, separated by one-fifth of the wing, the plical beneath the first discal. There is an almost marginal series of indistinct dark fuscous dots along the posterior part of the costa and tornus. The hindwings are grey.
