= Arragonia kautzi =

Scientific classification
- Domain: Eukaryota
- Kingdom: Animalia
- Phylum: Arthropoda
- Class: Insecta
- Order: Lepidoptera
- Family: Autostichidae
- Genus: Arragonia
- Species: A. kautzi

Binomial name
- Arragonia kautzi (Rebel, 1928)

Synonyms
- Holcopogon kautzi Rebel, 1928

Species of moth

Arragonia kautzi is a moth of the family Autostichidae. It is found in Spain.
