= Autosticha nothropis =

Scientific classification
- Kingdom: Animalia
- Phylum: Arthropoda
- Clade: Pancrustacea
- Class: Insecta
- Order: Lepidoptera
- Family: Autostichidae
- Genus: Autosticha
- Species: A. nothropis

Binomial name
- Autosticha nothropis Meyrick, 1921

Species of moth

Autosticha nothropis is a moth in the family Autostichidae. It was described by Edward Meyrick in 1921. It is found in South Africa and Zimbabwe.

The wingspan is about 21 mm. The forewings are fuscous, with the bases of the scales grey whitish. The stigmata are large, and blackish, the plical rather obliquely before the first discal. There is an almost marginal series of small blackish dots around the posterior part of the costa and termen. The hindwings are grey.
