= Autosticha chlorodelta =

Scientific classification
- Kingdom: Animalia
- Phylum: Arthropoda
- Clade: Pancrustacea
- Class: Insecta
- Order: Lepidoptera
- Family: Autostichidae
- Genus: Autosticha
- Species: A. chlorodelta

Binomial name
- Autosticha chlorodelta (Meyrick, 1906)

Synonyms
- Epicoenia chlorodelta Meyrick, 1906

Species of moth

Autosticha chlorodelta is a moth in the family Autostichidae. It was described by Edward Meyrick in 1906. It is found in Sri Lanka.

The wingspan is 14–15 mm. The forewings are dark fuscous with a small basal ochreous-orange spot. The stigmata and a small pre-tornal spot are very obscurely darker, the plical obliquely before the first discal. There is a triangular ochreous-orange blotch extending on the costa from three-fifths to rather near the apex, and reaching more than half across the wing. The hindwings are dark grey.
