= Autosticha academica =

Scientific classification
- Kingdom: Animalia
- Phylum: Arthropoda
- Clade: Pancrustacea
- Class: Insecta
- Order: Lepidoptera
- Family: Autostichidae
- Genus: Autosticha
- Species: A. academica

Binomial name
- Autosticha academica Meyrick, 1922

Species of moth

Autosticha academica is a moth in the family Autostichidae. It was described by Edward Meyrick in 1922. It is found on Java in Indonesia.

The wingspan is about 18 mm. The forewings are yellow ochreous, sprinkled with dark fuscous and with small suffused dark fuscous spots on the costa at the base, one-fourth, the middle, and three-fourths. The stigmata are large and blackish, the plical rather obliquely beyond the first discal. There is an angulated series of blackish dots near and parallel to the posterior part of the costa and termen. The hindwings are grey.
