= Holcopogon glaserorum =

Scientific classification
- Kingdom: Animalia
- Phylum: Arthropoda
- Clade: Pancrustacea
- Class: Insecta
- Order: Lepidoptera
- Family: Autostichidae
- Genus: Holcopogon
- Species: H. glaserorum

Binomial name
- Holcopogon glaserorum Gozmány, 1985

Species of moth

Holcopogon glaserorum is a moth of the family Autostichidae. It is found in Spain.
