= Hesperesta alicantella =

Scientific classification
- Kingdom: Animalia
- Phylum: Arthropoda
- Class: Insecta
- Order: Lepidoptera
- Family: Autostichidae
- Genus: Hesperesta
- Species: H. alicantella

Binomial name
- Hesperesta alicantella Derra, 2008

Synonyms
- Hesperesta alicantana

Species of moth

Hesperesta alicantella is a moth of the family Autostichidae. It is found in Spain.
