= Stereosticha =

Scientific classification
- Kingdom: Animalia
- Phylum: Arthropoda
- Class: Insecta
- Order: Lepidoptera
- Family: Autostichidae
- Subfamily: Autostichinae
- Genus: Stereosticha; Meyrick, 1913
- Species: S. pilulata

Binomial name
- Stereosticha pilulata Meyrick, 1913

Genus of moths

Stereosticha is a moth genus in the subfamily Autostichinae. It contains the species Stereosticha pilulata, which is found in Sri Lanka.

The wingspan is about 9 mm. The forewings are dark fuscous, with a slight purplish tinge and a small ochreous-whitish spot on the costa before one-third, as well as a small round pale ochreous-yellowish spot in the disc beyond two-thirds. The extreme costal edge is shortly whitish above this. The hindwings are dark fuscous.
