= Anaptilora homoclera =

Scientific classification
- Kingdom: Animalia
- Phylum: Arthropoda
- Class: Insecta
- Order: Lepidoptera
- Family: Autostichidae
- Genus: Anaptilora
- Species: A. homoclera

Binomial name
- Anaptilora homoclera Meyrick, 1916

Species of moth

Anaptilora homoclera is a moth in the family Gelechiidae. It was described by Edward Meyrick in 1916. It is found in Australia, where it has been recorded from the Northern Territory, Queensland and New South Wales.

The wingspan is 11–12 mm. The forewings are pale greyish ochrous, more or less irrorated (sprinkled) with fuscous and dark fuscous and with blackish dots near the base above the middle and almost on the dorsum. The stigmata is rather large and blackish, with the plical somewhat before the first discal. There is a marginal series of blackish dots around the posterior part of the costa and termen. The hindwings are grey.
