= Autosticha enervata =

Scientific classification
- Kingdom: Animalia
- Phylum: Arthropoda
- Clade: Pancrustacea
- Class: Insecta
- Order: Lepidoptera
- Family: Autostichidae
- Genus: Autosticha
- Species: A. enervata

Binomial name
- Autosticha enervata Meyrick, 1929

Species of moth

Autosticha enervata is a moth in the family Autostichidae. It was described by Edward Meyrick in 1929. It is found in Assam, India.

The wingspan is 11–13 mm.
