= Autosticha banauscopa =

Scientific classification
- Kingdom: Animalia
- Phylum: Arthropoda
- Clade: Pancrustacea
- Class: Insecta
- Order: Lepidoptera
- Family: Autostichidae
- Genus: Autosticha
- Species: A. banauscopa

Binomial name
- Autosticha banauscopa (Meyrick, 1929)

Synonyms
- Pachnistis banauscopa Meyrick, 1929

Species of moth

Autosticha banauscopa is a moth in the family Autostichidae. It was described by Edward Meyrick in 1929. It is found on the islands of Vanuatu.

The wingspan is 10–11 mm.
