= Ptochoryctis perigramma =

Scientific classification
- Domain: Eukaryota
- Kingdom: Animalia
- Phylum: Arthropoda
- Class: Insecta
- Order: Lepidoptera
- Family: Autostichidae
- Genus: Ptochoryctis
- Species: P. perigramma

Binomial name
- Ptochoryctis perigramma Meyrick, 1926

Species of moth

Ptochoryctis perigramma is a moth in the family Autostichidae. It was described by Edward Meyrick in 1926. It is found on Borneo.
