= Heringita perarmata =

Scientific classification
- Kingdom: Animalia
- Phylum: Arthropoda
- Clade: Pancrustacea
- Class: Insecta
- Order: Lepidoptera
- Family: Autostichidae
- Genus: Heringita
- Species: H. perarmata

Binomial name
- Heringita perarmata (Gozmány, 2000)

Synonyms
- Heringia perarmata Gozmány, 2000

Species of moth

Heringita perarmata is a moth in the family Autostichidae. It was described by László Anthony Gozmány in 2000. It is found in Libya.
