= Diophila =

Scientific classification
- Kingdom: Animalia
- Phylum: Arthropoda
- Class: Insecta
- Order: Lepidoptera
- Family: Autostichidae
- Subfamily: Autostichinae
- Genus: Diophila; Meyrick, 1937

Genus of moths

Diophila is a genus of moths in the family Autostichidae. It was previously placed in the family Cosmopterigidae.

== Species ==
- Diophila bathrota (Meyrick, 1911)
- Diophila claricoma Meyrick, 1937
