= Autosticha protypa =

Scientific classification
- Kingdom: Animalia
- Phylum: Arthropoda
- Clade: Pancrustacea
- Class: Insecta
- Order: Lepidoptera
- Family: Autostichidae
- Genus: Autosticha
- Species: A. protypa

Binomial name
- Autosticha protypa Meyrick, 1908

Species of moth

Autosticha protypa is a moth in the family Autostichidae. It was described by Edward Meyrick in 1908. It is found in Sri Lanka.

The wingspan is 17–20 mm. The forewings are deep yellow ochreous or light ochreous brownish, sometimes sprinkled with dark fuscous. There is a blackish dot on the base of the costa. The stigmata are rather small and blackish, the plical almost beneath the first discal. There is a short inwardly oblique streak of fuscous suffusion from the dorsum just beyond the second discal. There is an almost marginal row of rather small blackish dots along the posterior half of the costa and termen to the dorsum before the tornus. The hindwings are grey, variable in intensity, darker in females.

The larvae feed in galleries of silk and refuse on lichens on mossy rocks.
