= Autosticha dimochla =

Scientific classification
- Kingdom: Animalia
- Phylum: Arthropoda
- Clade: Pancrustacea
- Class: Insecta
- Order: Lepidoptera
- Family: Autostichidae
- Genus: Autosticha
- Species: A. dimochla

Binomial name
- Autosticha dimochla Meyrick, 1935

Species of moth

Autosticha dimochla is a moth in the family Autostichidae. It was described by Edward Meyrick in 1935. It is found in China.
