= Autosticha naulychna =

Scientific classification
- Kingdom: Animalia
- Phylum: Arthropoda
- Clade: Pancrustacea
- Class: Insecta
- Order: Lepidoptera
- Family: Autostichidae
- Genus: Autosticha
- Species: A. naulychna

Binomial name
- Autosticha naulychna Meyrick, 1908

Species of moth

Autosticha naulychna is a moth in the family Autostichidae. It was described by Edward Meyrick in 1908. It is found in Sri Lanka.

The wingspan is 15–16 mm. The forewings are rather dark purplish grey with an orange-yellow basal patch, the outer edge running from one-third of the costa to one-fourth of the dorsum, the extreme costal edge dark fuscous. There is a small round yellow-whitish spot in the disc at two-thirds. The hindwings are rather dark grey.
