= Brachmia opaca =

Scientific classification
- Domain: Eukaryota
- Kingdom: Animalia
- Phylum: Arthropoda
- Class: Insecta
- Order: Lepidoptera
- Family: Gelechiidae
- Genus: Brachmia
- Species: B. opaca

Binomial name
- Brachmia opaca Meyrick, 1927

Species of moth

Brachmia opaca is a moth in the family Gelechiidae. It was described by Edward Meyrick in 1927. It is found in China and Taiwan.

Adults are externally identical to Autosticha modicella and Autosticha truncicola.
