= Autosticha calceata =

Scientific classification
- Kingdom: Animalia
- Phylum: Arthropoda
- Clade: Pancrustacea
- Class: Insecta
- Order: Lepidoptera
- Family: Autostichidae
- Genus: Autosticha
- Species: A. calceata

Binomial name
- Autosticha calceata Meyrick, 1908

Species of moth

Autosticha calceata is a moth in the family Autostichidae. It was described by Edward Meyrick in 1908. It is found in Sri Lanka.

The wingspan is 11–15 mm. The forewings are white, sometimes partially fuscous tinged, more or less sprinkled with fuscous and a few blackish scales. There are small blackish spots on the costa at the base, one-fourth, and the middle, and an almost marginal series extending around the posterior part of the costa and termen to the dorsum before the tornus. The stigmata are large and blackish, the plical obliquely beyond the first discal. Additional blackish dots are found beneath the costa near the base, and between the median costal and second discal stigma. The hindwings are pale grey.
