= Hesperesta geminella =

Scientific classification
- Kingdom: Animalia
- Phylum: Arthropoda
- Class: Insecta
- Order: Lepidoptera
- Family: Autostichidae
- Genus: Hesperesta
- Species: H. geminella

Binomial name
- Hesperesta geminella (Chrétien, 1915)

Synonyms
- Holcopogon geminella Chrétien, 1915; Charadraula geminellus; Holcopogon geminellus Chrétien, 1915; Bubulcellodes perstriellus Amsel, 1942

Species of moth

Hesperesta geminella is a moth of the family Autostichidae. It is found in Spain and North Africa (Algeria).

The wingspan is about 4.5 mm for males and 7–8 mm for females. The forewings are white or creamy white. The hindwings are whitish.
