= Autosticha lushanensis =

Scientific classification
- Kingdom: Animalia
- Phylum: Arthropoda
- Clade: Pancrustacea
- Class: Insecta
- Order: Lepidoptera
- Family: Autostichidae
- Genus: Autosticha
- Species: A. lushanensis

Binomial name
- Autosticha lushanensis Park & C. S. Wu, 2003

Species of moth

Autosticha lushanensis is a moth in the family Autostichidae. It was described by Kyu-Tek Park and Chun-Sheng Wu in 2003. It is found in China (Jiangxi, Hainan, Guangdong, Zhejiang) and Taiwan.

The wingspan is 17–19 mm.

== Etymology ==
The species name is derived from the type location.
