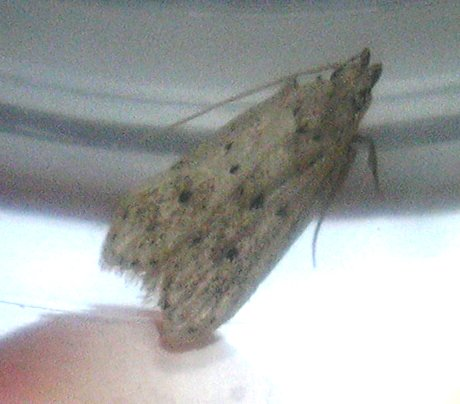

Scientific classification
- Kingdom: Animalia
- Phylum: Arthropoda
- Clade: Pancrustacea
- Class: Insecta
- Order: Lepidoptera
- Family: Autostichidae
- Genus: Autosticha
- Species: A. pelodes

Binomial name
- Autosticha pelodes (Meyrick, 1883)

Synonyms
- Automola pelodes Meyrick, 1883; Depressaria convictella

= Autosticha pelodes =

Autosticha gelechid moth

Species of moth

Autosticha pelodes, the autosticha gelechid moth, is a moth of the family Autostichidae. It was first described by Edward Meyrick in 1883. It is found in the southern Pacific, including Hawaii and French Polynesia, Java, Sulawesi, the New Hebrides, Samoa, the Austral Islands and the Marquesas. It has been dispersed by humans.
