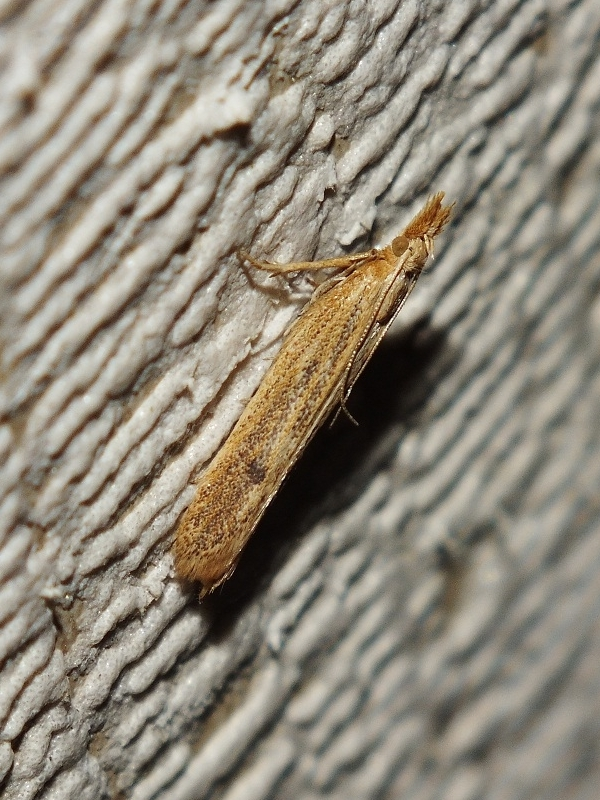
- Holcopogon adseclellus

Scientific classification
- Kingdom: Animalia
- Phylum: Arthropoda
- Clade: Pancrustacea
- Class: Insecta
- Order: Lepidoptera
- Family: Autostichidae
- Subfamily: Holcopogoninae
- Genus: Holcopogon; Staudinger in Romanoff, 1879

Type species
- Holcopogon helveolellus Staudinger, 1879

Synonyms
- Cyrmia [lapsus]; Cyrnia Walsingham, 1900; Epistomotis Meyrick, 1906

= Holcopogon =

Genus of moths

Holcopogon is a genus of gelechioid moths. It is the type genus of the subfamily Holcopogoninae, which is placed within the concealer moth family Autostichidae.

The type species was designated as H. helveolellus, but this turned out to be a junior synonym of H. bubulcellus. Some authors have thus erroneously assumed the latter taxon to be the genus' type. Cyrnia is sometimes listed as a distinct genus, but its type species (Cyrnia barbata) is generally assumed to be another junior synonym of H. bubulcellus. Thus, Cyrnia is a junior subjective synonym of Holcopogon.

== Species ==
The following species are recognised in the genus Holcopogon:

- Holcopogon adseclellus (Staudinger, 1859)
- Holcopogon bubulcellus (Staudinger, 1859)
- Holcopogon cinerascens Turati, 1926
- Holcopogon glaserorum Gozmany, 1985
- Holcopogon helveolellus Staudinger, 1879
- Holcopogon rhyodes (Meyrick, 1909)
- Holcopogon robustus (Butler, 1883)
- Holcopogon scaeocentra Meyrick, 1921
- Holcopogon tucki Vives Moreno, 1999
