= Holcopogoninae =

Scientific classification
- Kingdom: Animalia
- Phylum: Arthropoda
- Clade: Pancrustacea
- Class: Insecta
- Order: Lepidoptera
- Family: Autostichidae
- Subfamily: Holcopogoninae; Gozmany, 1967

Diversity
- 8–10 genera (see text)

Synonyms
- Holcopogonidae Gozmany, 1967; Oeciinae Hodges, 1998

Subfamily of moths

The Holcopogoninae are a subfamily of moths. They belong to the huge the superfamily Gelechioidea, of which they represent a minor but apparently quite distinct lineage.

They are usually included in the family Autostichidae.

== Genera ==
This family contains about 10 genera:

- Arragonia Amsel, 1942
- Charadraula Meyrick, 1931
- Cyllaraxis Gozmány in Gaedike, 2000
- Gobiletria Gozmány, 1964
- Heringita Agenjo, 1953
- Hesperesta Gozmany, 1978
- Holcopogon Staudinger, 1880
- Oecia Walsingham, 1897
- Turatia Amsel, 1942

== Former genera ==
- Bubulcellodes Amsel, 1942 (in Charadraula)
- Gigantoletria Gozmany, 1963 (in Heringita)
- Ilionarsis Gozmány, 1959 (in Turatia)
