= Symmoca libanicolella =

Scientific classification
- Kingdom: Animalia
- Phylum: Arthropoda
- Clade: Pancrustacea
- Class: Insecta
- Order: Lepidoptera
- Family: Autostichidae
- Genus: Symmoca
- Species: S. libanicolella

Binomial name
- Symmoca libanicolella Zerny, 1934

Species of moth

Symmoca libanicolella is a moth in the family Autostichidae. It was described by Zerny in 1934. It is found in Lebanon.
