= Agyrta grandimacula =

Scientific classification
- Kingdom: Animalia
- Phylum: Arthropoda
- Class: Insecta
- Order: Lepidoptera
- Superfamily: Noctuoidea
- Family: Erebidae
- Subfamily: Arctiinae
- Genus: Agyrta
- Species: A. grandimacula

Binomial name
- Agyrta grandimacula Zerny, 1931

Species of moth

Agyrta grandimacula is a moth of the subfamily Arctiinae. It was described by Zerny in 1931. It is found in Ecuador.
