= Eressa subaurata =

Scientific classification
- Kingdom: Animalia
- Phylum: Arthropoda
- Class: Insecta
- Order: Lepidoptera
- Superfamily: Noctuoidea
- Family: Erebidae
- Subfamily: Arctiinae
- Genus: Eressa
- Species: E. subaurata

Binomial name
- Eressa subaurata (Walker, 1854)

Synonyms
- Glaucopsis subaurata Walker, 1854

Species of moth

Eressa subaurata is a moth of the family Erebidae. It was described by Francis Walker in 1854 and is found in Sri Lanka.

Antennae bipectinate (comb like on both sides) in the male, branches short and dilated distally. Antennae serrate (tooth like on one side) in the female. Differs from Eressa confinis in being smaller and in the interno-median hyaline patch of forewing extending to near the base of wing.
