= Symmoca rifellus =

Scientific classification
- Domain: Eukaryota
- Kingdom: Animalia
- Phylum: Arthropoda
- Class: Insecta
- Order: Lepidoptera
- Family: Autostichidae
- Genus: Symmoca
- Species: S. rifellus

Binomial name
- Symmoca rifellus (Zerny, 1932)

Synonyms
- Ceuthomadarus rifellus Zerny, 1932; Asarista homalodoxa Meyrick, 1935

Species of moth

Symmoca rifellus is a moth in the family Autostichidae. It was described by Zerny in 1932. It is found in Morocco.

The wingspan is about 15 mm.
