= Symmoca maschalista =

Scientific classification
- Kingdom: Animalia
- Phylum: Arthropoda
- Class: Insecta
- Order: Lepidoptera
- Family: Autostichidae
- Genus: Symmoca
- Species: S. maschalista

Binomial name
- Symmoca maschalista Meyrick, 1926

Species of moth

Symmoca maschalista is a moth in the family Autostichidae. It was described by Edward Meyrick in 1926. It was first found in Kumaon, India (now part of Uttarakhand).

The wingspan is 22–23 mm. Adults are similar to Kertomesis anaphracta, but can be distinguished by the much larger size and in having a short black streak along the dorsum towards the base, of which in K. anaphracta there is no trace.
