= Eupithecia schwingenschussi =

Scientific classification
- Domain: Eukaryota
- Kingdom: Animalia
- Phylum: Arthropoda
- Class: Insecta
- Order: Lepidoptera
- Family: Geometridae
- Genus: Eupithecia
- Species: E. schwingenschussi

Binomial name
- Eupithecia schwingenschussi Zerny, 1934

Species of moth

Eupithecia schwingenschussi is a moth in the family Geometridae. It is found in Morocco.
