= Symmoca umbrinella =

Scientific classification
- Domain: Eukaryota
- Kingdom: Animalia
- Phylum: Arthropoda
- Class: Insecta
- Order: Lepidoptera
- Family: Autostichidae
- Genus: Symmoca
- Species: S. umbrinella

Binomial name
- Symmoca umbrinella Zerny, 1936

Species of moth

Symmoca umbrinella is a moth in the family Autostichidae. It was described by Zerny in 1936. It is found in Morocco.
