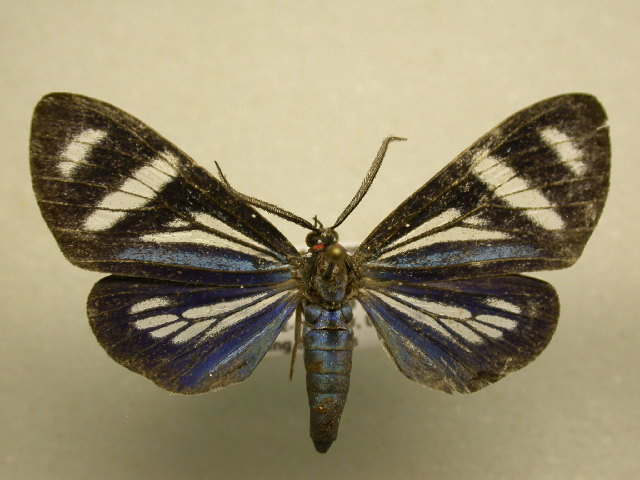
- Isostola nigrivenata

Scientific classification
- Domain: Eukaryota
- Kingdom: Animalia
- Phylum: Arthropoda
- Class: Insecta
- Order: Lepidoptera
- Superfamily: Noctuoidea
- Family: Erebidae
- Subfamily: Arctiinae
- Subtribe: Pericopina
- Genus: Isostola; Felder, 1874

= Isostola =

Genus of moths

Isostola is a genus of moths in the family Erebidae described by Felder in 1874.

== Species ==
- Isostola albiplaga Hering, 1925
- Isostola dilatata Hering, 1925
- Isostola divisa Walker, 1854
- Isostola flavicollaris Hering, 1925
- Isostola nigrivenata Hering, 1925
- Isostola philomela Druce, 1893
- Isostola rhodobroncha Felder, 1874
- Isostola tenebrata Hering, 1925
- Isostola thabena Dognin, 1919
- Isostola vicina Butler, 1876

== Former species ==
- Isostola superba Druce, 1885
