= Mylothra pyrrhella =

Scientific classification
- Kingdom: Animalia
- Phylum: Arthropoda
- Class: Insecta
- Order: Lepidoptera
- Family: Autostichidae
- Genus: Mylothra
- Species: M. pyrrhella

Binomial name
- Mylothra pyrrhella (Ragonot, 1895)

Synonyms
- Symmoca pyrrhella Ragonot, 1895; Symmoca zeitunella Rebel, 1902

Species of moth

Mylothra pyrrhella is a moth of the family Autostichidae. It is found in Turkey.

The wingspan is 19–20 mm. It is similar to Symmoca straminella, but the forewing has a fine orange tint.
