= Eressa buddha =

Scientific classification
- Domain: Eukaryota
- Kingdom: Animalia
- Phylum: Arthropoda
- Class: Insecta
- Order: Lepidoptera
- Superfamily: Noctuoidea
- Family: Erebidae
- Subfamily: Arctiinae
- Genus: Eressa
- Species: E. buddha

Binomial name
- Eressa buddha Zerny, 1931

Species of moth

Eressa buddha is a moth of the family Erebidae. It was described by Zerny in 1931. It is found in India (Assam).
