= Symmoca tofosella =

Scientific classification
- Domain: Eukaryota
- Kingdom: Animalia
- Phylum: Arthropoda
- Class: Insecta
- Order: Lepidoptera
- Family: Autostichidae
- Genus: Symmoca
- Species: S. tofosella

Binomial name
- Symmoca tofosella Rebel, 1893

Species of moth

Symmoca tofosella is a moth of the family Autostichidae. It is found in Portugal, Spain and Italy.

The wingspan is about 16 mm. The ground colour of the forewings is brownish grey, dusted with whitish scales along the margin. The hindwings are brownish grey.
