= Eressa strepsimeris =

Scientific classification
- Kingdom: Animalia
- Phylum: Arthropoda
- Class: Insecta
- Order: Lepidoptera
- Superfamily: Noctuoidea
- Family: Erebidae
- Subfamily: Arctiinae
- Genus: Eressa
- Species: E. strepsimeris

Binomial name
- Eressa strepsimeris (Meyrick, 1886)

Synonyms
- Choromeles strepsimeris Meyrick, 1886; Eressa xanthostacta Hampson, 1903; Eressa stenothyris Turner, 1933

Species of moth

Eressa strepsimeris is a moth of the family Erebidae. It was described by Edward Meyrick in 1886. It is found in Australia.
