= Symmoca solanella =

Scientific classification
- Domain: Eukaryota
- Kingdom: Animalia
- Phylum: Arthropoda
- Class: Insecta
- Order: Lepidoptera
- Family: Autostichidae
- Genus: Symmoca
- Species: S. solanella

Binomial name
- Symmoca solanella Amsel, 1953

Species of moth

Symmoca solanella is a moth in the family Autostichidae. It was described by Hans Georg Amsel in 1953 and is found in Morocco.
