= Agyrta conspicua =

Scientific classification
- Kingdom: Animalia
- Phylum: Arthropoda
- Class: Insecta
- Order: Lepidoptera
- Superfamily: Noctuoidea
- Family: Erebidae
- Subfamily: Arctiinae
- Genus: Agyrta
- Species: A. conspicua

Binomial name
- Agyrta conspicua Schaus, 1911

Species of moth

Agyrta conspicua is a moth of the subfamily Arctiinae. It was described by Schaus in 1911. It is found in Costa Rica.
