= Kertomesis amphicalyx =

Scientific classification
- Domain: Eukaryota
- Kingdom: Animalia
- Phylum: Arthropoda
- Class: Insecta
- Order: Lepidoptera
- Family: Autostichidae
- Genus: Kertomesis
- Species: K. amphicalyx

Binomial name
- Kertomesis amphicalyx (Meyrick, 1911)

Synonyms
- Paradoris amphicalyx Meyrick, 1911

Species of moth

Kertomesis amphicalyx is a moth in the family Autostichidae. It was described by Edward Meyrick in 1911 and is found in India.

The wingspan is 11–13mm. The forewings are ochreous white with a moderate blackish basal fascia, the posterior edge of which is nearly straight. The plical and first discal stigmata are minute and black, with the plical located beneath the first discal. There is a moderate blackish fascia at about three-fifths, constricted in the middle. Several undefined dots or groups of blackish scales are present around the apical part of the costa and the upper part of the termen. The hindwings are grey.
