= Symmoca deprinsi =

Scientific classification
- Kingdom: Animalia
- Phylum: Arthropoda
- Clade: Pancrustacea
- Class: Insecta
- Order: Lepidoptera
- Family: Autostichidae
- Genus: Symmoca
- Species: S. deprinsi

Binomial name
- Symmoca deprinsi Gozmány, 2001

Species of moth

Symmoca deprinsi is a moth of the family Autostichidae. It is found in Asia Minor.

The length of the forewings is 17 mm for males and 19 mm for females.

== Etymology ==
The species is dedicated to lepidopterist Mr. W. De Prins.
