= Agyrta varuna =

Scientific classification
- Kingdom: Animalia
- Phylum: Arthropoda
- Class: Insecta
- Order: Lepidoptera
- Superfamily: Noctuoidea
- Family: Erebidae
- Subfamily: Arctiinae
- Genus: Agyrta
- Species: A. varuna

Binomial name
- Agyrta varuna H. Druce, 1907

Synonyms
- Agyrta lacteicolor Rothschild, 1912

Species of moth

Agyrta varuna is a moth of the subfamily Arctiinae. It was described by Herbert Druce in 1907. It is found in Peru.
