= Symmoca quinquepunctella =

Scientific classification
- Kingdom: Animalia
- Phylum: Arthropoda
- Class: Insecta
- Order: Lepidoptera
- Family: Autostichidae
- Genus: Symmoca
- Species: S. quinquepunctella

Binomial name
- Symmoca quinquepunctella Chrétien, 1922

Species of moth

Symmoca quinquepunctella is a moth in the family Autostichidae. It was described by Pierre Chrétien in 1922. It is found in Morocco.
