= Mylothra forsteri =

Scientific classification
- Kingdom: Animalia
- Phylum: Arthropoda
- Clade: Pancrustacea
- Class: Insecta
- Order: Lepidoptera
- Family: Autostichidae
- Genus: Mylothra
- Species: M. forsteri

Binomial name
- Mylothra forsteri (Gozmany, 1963)

Synonyms
- Symmoca forsteri Gozmany, 1963

Species of moth

Mylothra forsteri is a moth of the family Autostichidae. It is found in Iran.
