= Mylothra =

Scientific classification
- Kingdom: Animalia
- Phylum: Arthropoda
- Class: Insecta
- Order: Lepidoptera
- Family: Autostichidae
- Subfamily: Symmocinae
- Genus: Mylothra; Meyrick, 1907

Synonyms
- Megasymmoca Gozmány, 1963

Genus of moths

Mylothra is a genus of moths in the family Autostichidae.

== Species ==
- Mylothra christophi Gozmány, 1967
- Mylothra creseritis Meyrick, 1907
- Mylothra forsteri (Gozmany, 1963)
- Mylothra maga (Gozmany, 1963)
- Mylothra mithra (Gozmany, 1963)
- Mylothra mithridates (Gozmany, 1963)
- Mylothra persica (Gozmany, 1963)
- Mylothra pyrrhella (Ragonot, 1895)
- Mylothra sahname (Gozmany, 1963)
- Mylothra satrapa (Gozmany, 1963)
- Mylothra sheherezade (Gozmany, 1963)
- Mylothra sindbad (Gozmany, 1963)
- Mylothra turana (Caradja, 1920)
