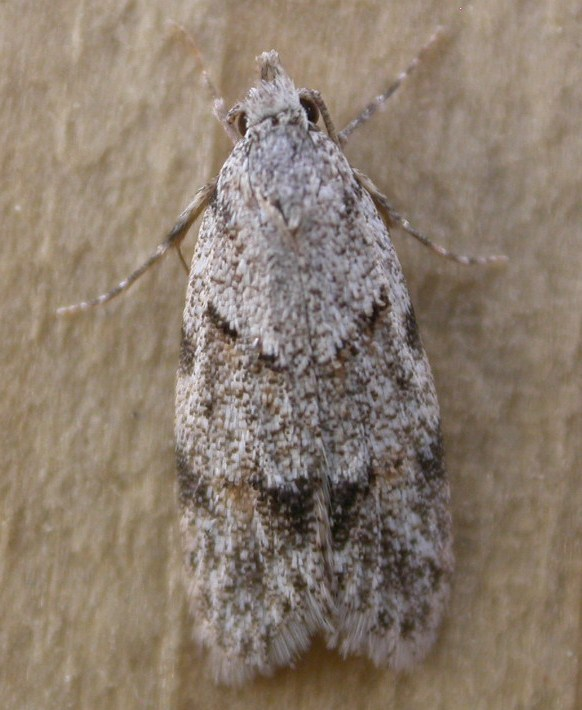
- Symmoca signatella

Scientific classification
- Kingdom: Animalia
- Phylum: Arthropoda
- Clade: Pancrustacea
- Class: Insecta
- Order: Lepidoptera
- Family: Autostichidae
- Tribe: Symmocini
- Genus: Symmoca; Hübner, 1825

Synonyms
- Asarista Meyrick, 1935; Conquassata Gozmány, 1957; Parasymmoca Rebel, 1903; Symmoletria Gozmány, 1963

= Symmoca =

Genus of moths

Symmoca is a genus of moths in the family Autostichidae.

== Species ==
- Symmoca achrestella Rebel, 1889
- Symmoca achromatella Turati, 1930
- Symmoca alacris Meyrick, 1918
- Symmoca albicanella Zeller, 1868
- Symmoca alhambrella Walsingham, 1911
- Symmoca arcuata Gozmány, 2008
- Symmoca ascalaphus Gozmány, 2008
- Symmoca attalica Gozmány, 1957
- Symmoca calidella Walsingham, 1905
- Symmoca caliginella Mann, 1867
- Symmoca capnistis Gozmány, 2008
- Symmoca christenseni Gozmány, 1982
- Symmoca cinerariella Mann, 1859
- Symmoca costimacula Turati, 1930
- Symmoca costobscurella Amsel, 1949
- Symmoca crocodesma Meyrick, 1911
- Symmoca degregorioi Requena, 2007
- Symmoca deprinsi Gozmány, 2001
- Symmoca deserticolella Turati, 1924
- Symmoca designella Herrich-Schäffer, 1855
- Symmoca dodecatella Staudinger, 1859
- Symmoca dolomitana Huemer & Gozmány, 1992
- Symmoca egregiella Lucas, 1956
- Symmoca euxantha Gozmány, 2008
- Symmoca fuscella Amsel, 1959
- Symmoca hendrikseni Gozmány, 1996
- Symmoca italica Gozmány, 1962
- Symmoca latiusculella Stainton, 1867
- Symmoca libanicolella Zerny, 1934
- Symmoca longipalpella Rebel, 1914
- Symmoca mannii Gozmány, 2008
- Symmoca maschalista Meyrick, 1926
- Symmoca megalomera Gozmány, 2008
- Symmoca mimetica Gozmány, 2008
- Symmoca minimella Caradja, 1920
- Symmoca mobilella Zerny, 1936
- Symmoca multicrassa Gozmány, 2008
- Symmoca nigromaculella Ragonot, 1875
- Symmoca nivalis Gozmány, 1988
- Symmoca oenophila Staudinger, 1871
- Symmoca orphnella Rebel, 1893
- Symmoca paghmana Gozmány, 2008
- Symmoca pelospora Meyrick, 1927
- Symmoca perobscurata Gozmány, 1957
- Symmoca petrogenes Walsingham, 1907
- Symmoca ponerias Walsingham, 1905
- Symmoca profanella Zerny, 1936
- Symmoca pyrenaica Gozmány, 1985
- Symmoca quinquepunctella Chretién, 1922
- Symmoca revoluta Gozmány, 1985
- Symmoca rifellus (Zerny, 1932)
- Symmoca ronkayi Gozmány, 2008
- Symmoca saharae (Oberthür, 1888)
- Symmoca salem Gozmány, 1963
- Symmoca salinata Gozmány, 1986
- Symmoca samum Gozmány, 1988
- Symmoca saracenica Gozmány, 2008
- Symmoca sattleri Gozmány, 1962
- Symmoca schmidi Jürg Schmid, 2026
- Symmoca secreta (Gozmány, 2008)
- Symmoca sefidica Gozmány, 2008
- Symmoca senora Gozmány, 1977
- Symmoca senorita Gozmány, 1988
- Symmoca serrata Gozmány, 1985
- Symmoca sezam Gozmány, 1963
- Symmoca shahriar Gozmány, 2008
- Symmoca signatella Herrich-Schäffer, 1854
- Symmoca signella Hübner, 1796
- Symmoca simulans Gozmány, 1985
- Symmoca solanella Amsel, 1953
- Symmoca sorrisa Gozmány, 1985
- Symmoca squalida Gozmány, 2008
- Symmoca stigmaphora Gozmány, 2008
- Symmoca straminella Gozmány, 1986
- Symmoca striolatella Gozmány, 1963
- Symmoca suffumata Gozmány, 1996
- Symmoca sultan Gozmány, 1962
- Symmoca sutteri Gozmány, 2000
- Symmoca tofosella Rebel, 1893
- Symmoca tunesica Gozmány, 1988
- Symmoca umbrinella Zerny, 1936
- Symmoca uniformella Rebel, 1900
- Symmoca vetusta Meyrick, 1931
- Symmoca vitiosella Zeller, 1868
- Symmoca vojnitsi Gozmány, 2008

== Former species ==
- Symmoca desertella Turati, 1924
- Symmoca klimeschiella Gozmány, 1959
- Symmoca melitensis Amsel, 1954
- Symmoca pleostigmella Rebel, 1917
- Symmoca sparsella (de Joannis, 1891)
- Symmoca torrida Gozmány, 1961
- Symmoca tristella Caradja, 1920
