= Symmoca oenophila =

Scientific classification
- Domain: Eukaryota
- Kingdom: Animalia
- Phylum: Arthropoda
- Class: Insecta
- Order: Lepidoptera
- Family: Autostichidae
- Genus: Symmoca
- Species: S. oenophila

Binomial name
- Symmoca oenophila Staudinger, 1871

Synonyms
- Amselina altitudinis Gozmány, 1962; Symmoca muricella Chrétien, 1896

Species of moth

Symmoca oenophila is a moth of the family Autostichidae. It is found in France, Portugal and Spain.

The wingspan is 16–18 mm.
