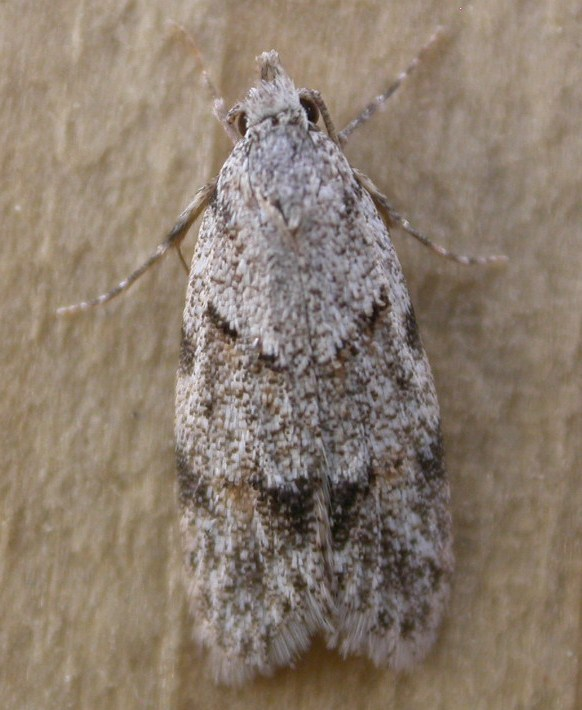

Scientific classification
- Domain: Eukaryota
- Kingdom: Animalia
- Phylum: Arthropoda
- Class: Insecta
- Order: Lepidoptera
- Family: Autostichidae
- Genus: Symmoca
- Species: S. signatella

Binomial name
- Symmoca signatella Herrich-Schäffer, 1854

Synonyms
- Symmoca rosmarinella Walsingham, 1901; Symmoca melitensis Amsel, 1954

= Symmoca signatella =

Species of moth

Symmoca signatella is a moth of the family Autostichidae. It is known from most of western Europe, but also Lithuania, Croatia, Greece and southern Russia. It has also been recorded from California in North America.

The wingspan is 12–15 mm. Adults are on wing in late summer and autumn.

The larvae feed on dried vegetable matter. They have been recorded feeding on dry leaves and plant debris on the stem and branches of Rosmarinus officinalis. The accumulation of debris was connected by light webbing.
