= Symmoca nigromaculella =

Scientific classification
- Domain: Eukaryota
- Kingdom: Animalia
- Phylum: Arthropoda
- Class: Insecta
- Order: Lepidoptera
- Family: Autostichidae
- Genus: Symmoca
- Species: S. nigromaculella

Binomial name
- Symmoca nigromaculella Ragonot, 1875

Synonyms
- Symmoca singevergella Amsel, 1959

Species of moth

Symmoca nigromaculella is a moth of the family Autostichidae. It is found in Portugal and Spain.
