= Symmoca tunesica =

Scientific classification
- Kingdom: Animalia
- Phylum: Arthropoda
- Clade: Pancrustacea
- Class: Insecta
- Order: Lepidoptera
- Family: Autostichidae
- Genus: Symmoca
- Species: S. tunesica

Binomial name
- Symmoca tunesica Gozmány, 1988

Species of moth

Symmoca tunesica is a moth in the family Autostichidae. It was described by László Anthony Gozmány in 1988. It is found in Tunisia.
