= Eressa ypleta =

Scientific classification
- Domain: Eukaryota
- Kingdom: Animalia
- Phylum: Arthropoda
- Class: Insecta
- Order: Lepidoptera
- Superfamily: Noctuoidea
- Family: Erebidae
- Subfamily: Arctiinae
- Genus: Eressa
- Species: E. ypleta

Binomial name
- Eressa ypleta (C. Swinhoe, 1892)

Synonyms
- Syntomis ypleta C. Swinhoe, 1892

Species of moth

Eressa ypleta is a moth of the family Erebidae. It was described by Charles Swinhoe in 1892. It is found on Waigeo in Indonesia.
