= Eressa affinis =

Scientific classification
- Domain: Eukaryota
- Kingdom: Animalia
- Phylum: Arthropoda
- Class: Insecta
- Order: Lepidoptera
- Superfamily: Noctuoidea
- Family: Erebidae
- Subfamily: Arctiinae
- Genus: Eressa
- Species: E. affinis

Binomial name
- Eressa affinis Moore, 1877

Synonyms
- Eressa politula Swinhoe, 1892

Species of moth

Eressa affinis is a moth of the family Erebidae. It was described by Frederic Moore in 1877. It is found on the Andaman Islands in the Indian Ocean.
