= Symmoca perobscurata =

Scientific classification
- Kingdom: Animalia
- Phylum: Arthropoda
- Clade: Pancrustacea
- Class: Insecta
- Order: Lepidoptera
- Family: Autostichidae
- Genus: Symmoca
- Species: S. perobscurata

Binomial name
- Symmoca perobscurata Gozmány, 1957

Synonyms
- Symmoca torrida Gozmány 1961

Species of moth

Symmoca perobscurata is a moth of the Symmocidae family. It is found in Portugal and Spain.
