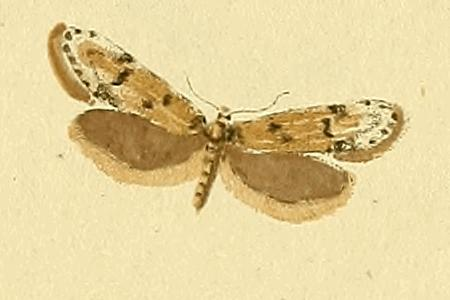

Scientific classification
- Kingdom: Animalia
- Phylum: Arthropoda
- Clade: Pancrustacea
- Class: Insecta
- Order: Lepidoptera
- Family: Autostichidae
- Genus: Symmoca
- Species: S. signella

Binomial name
- Symmoca signella (Hübner, 1796)

Synonyms
- Tinea signella Hübner, 1796; Symmoca albidella Burmann, 1951; Symmoca nigrella Burmann, 1951; Symmoca flavella Burmann, 1951; Symmoca obsoletella Burmann, 1951

= Symmoca signella =

Species of moth

Symmoca signella is a moth of the family Autostichidae. It is found in Spain, France, Germany, Switzerland, Austria, Italy, Slovenia, Croatia and Greece.
