= Symmoca suffumata =

Scientific classification
- Kingdom: Animalia
- Phylum: Arthropoda
- Clade: Pancrustacea
- Class: Insecta
- Order: Lepidoptera
- Family: Autostichidae
- Genus: Symmoca
- Species: S. suffumata

Binomial name
- Symmoca suffumata Gozmány, 1996

Species of moth

Symmoca suffumata is a moth of the family Autostichidae. It is found in Spain.
