= Symmoca alacris =

Scientific classification
- Kingdom: Animalia
- Phylum: Arthropoda
- Class: Insecta
- Order: Lepidoptera
- Family: Autostichidae
- Genus: Symmoca
- Species: S. alacris

Binomial name
- Symmoca alacris Meyrick, 1918

Species of moth

Symmoca alacris is a moth in the family Autostichidae. It was described by Edward Meyrick in 1918. It is found in Kanara in Karnataka, India.

The wingspan is 11–12 mm. The forewings are light ochreous, violet iridescent, sprinkled with light brownish, especially in males and with a few dark fuscous scales. There are blackish dots on the base of the costa and dorsum. The stigmata are blackish, the plical rather before the first discal and there is a blackish dot on the dorsum before the second discal, connected with it by an oblique cloudy streak of fuscous suffusion, in males extended to the costa. There are some undefined almost marginal dots of dark fuscous suffusion around the apex. The hindwings are light grey.
