= Symmoca costimacula =

Scientific classification
- Domain: Eukaryota
- Kingdom: Animalia
- Phylum: Arthropoda
- Class: Insecta
- Order: Lepidoptera
- Family: Autostichidae
- Genus: Symmoca
- Species: S. costimacula

Binomial name
- Symmoca costimacula Turati, 1930

Species of moth

Symmoca costimacula is a moth in the family Autostichidae. It was described by Turati in 1930. It is found in Libya.
