= Mylothra sahname =

Scientific classification
- Kingdom: Animalia
- Phylum: Arthropoda
- Clade: Pancrustacea
- Class: Insecta
- Order: Lepidoptera
- Family: Autostichidae
- Genus: Mylothra
- Species: M. sahname

Binomial name
- Mylothra sahname (Gozmány, 1963)

Synonyms
- Megasymmoca sahname Gozmány, 1963

Species of moth

Mylothra sahname is a moth in the family Autostichidae. It was described by László Anthony Gozmány in 1963. It is found in Iran.
