= Symmoca vitiosella =

Scientific classification
- Kingdom: Animalia
- Phylum: Arthropoda
- Clade: Pancrustacea
- Class: Insecta
- Order: Lepidoptera
- Family: Autostichidae
- Genus: Symmoca
- Species: S. vitiosella

Binomial name
- Symmoca vitiosella Zeller, 1868

Species of moth

Symmoca vitiosella is a moth of the family Autostichidae. It is found on Cyprus and the Dodecanese Islands in the eastern Mediterranean.
