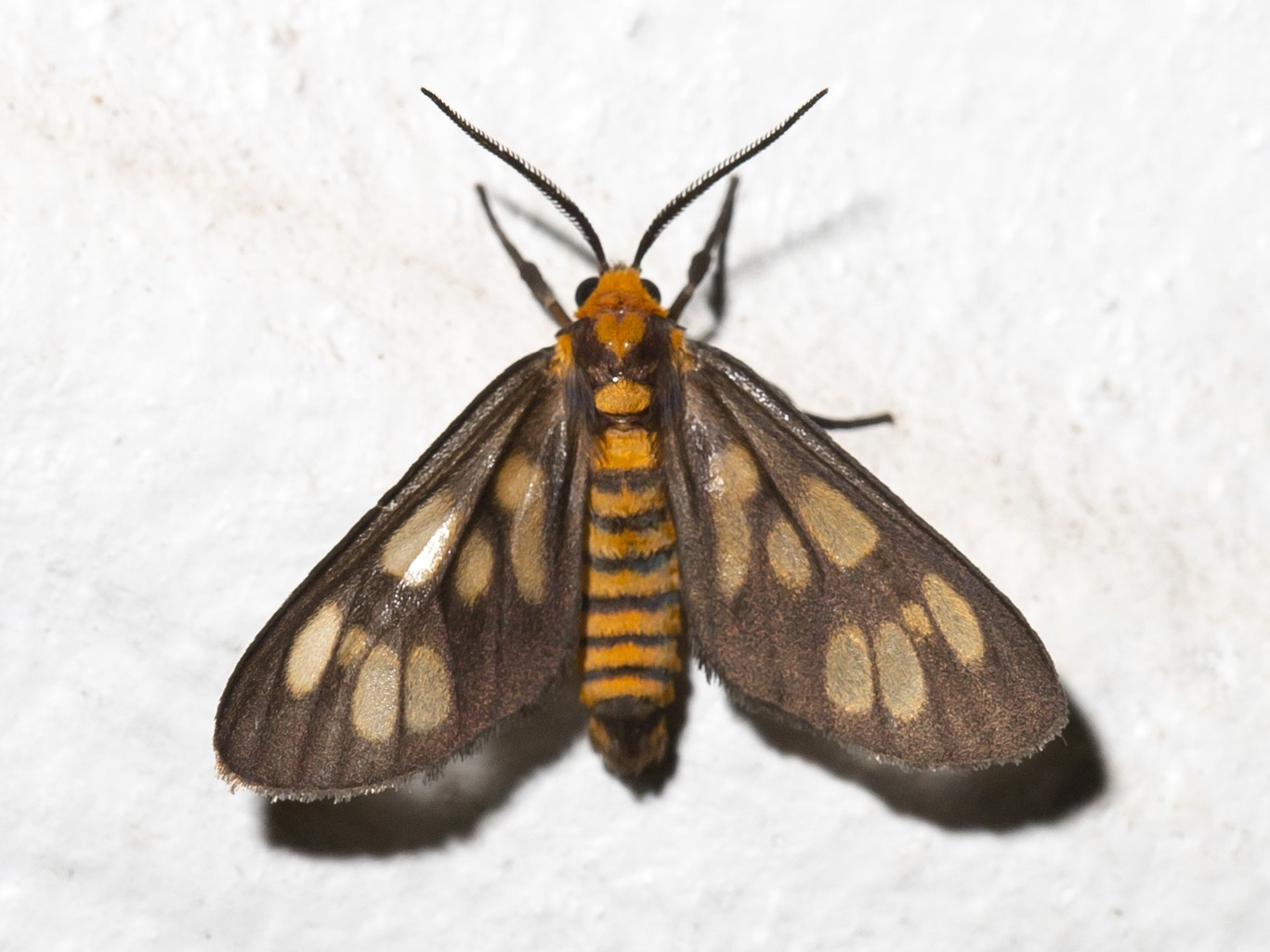

Scientific classification
- Domain: Eukaryota
- Kingdom: Animalia
- Phylum: Arthropoda
- Class: Insecta
- Order: Lepidoptera
- Superfamily: Noctuoidea
- Family: Erebidae
- Subfamily: Arctiinae
- Genus: Eressa
- Species: E. megalospilia

Binomial name
- Eressa megalospilia Turner, 1922

= Eressa megalospilia =

Species of moth

Eressa megalospilia is a species of moth in the family Erebidae. It was described by Alfred Jefferis Turner in 1922. It is found in Australia.
