= Symmoca deserticolella =

Scientific classification
- Domain: Eukaryota
- Kingdom: Animalia
- Phylum: Arthropoda
- Class: Insecta
- Order: Lepidoptera
- Family: Autostichidae
- Genus: Symmoca
- Species: S. deserticolella

Binomial name
- Symmoca deserticolella Turati, 1924

Species of moth

Symmoca deserticolella is a moth in the family Autostichidae. It was described by Turati in 1924. It is found in Libya.
