= Eressa microchilus =

Scientific classification
- Kingdom: Animalia
- Phylum: Arthropoda
- Clade: Pancrustacea
- Class: Insecta
- Order: Lepidoptera
- Superfamily: Noctuoidea
- Family: Erebidae
- Subfamily: Arctiinae
- Genus: Eressa
- Species: E. microchilus

Binomial name
- Eressa microchilus (Hampson, [1893])

Synonyms
- Syntomoides microchilus Hampson, [1893]; Syntomis plumalis Hampson, 1896

Species of moth

Eressa microchilus is a moth of the family Erebidae. It was described by George Hampson in 1893. It is found in Myanmar.
