= Symmoca uniformella =

Scientific classification
- Domain: Eukaryota
- Kingdom: Animalia
- Phylum: Arthropoda
- Class: Insecta
- Order: Lepidoptera
- Family: Autostichidae
- Genus: Symmoca
- Species: S. uniformella

Binomial name
- Symmoca uniformella Rebel, 1900

Species of moth

Symmoca uniformella is a moth of the family Autostichidae. It is found in Portugal and Spain.

The wingspan is 20–21 mm. The forewings are light grey, dusted with brownish grey. The hindwings are grey.
