= Eressa lutulenta =

Scientific classification
- Kingdom: Animalia
- Phylum: Arthropoda
- Class: Insecta
- Order: Lepidoptera
- Superfamily: Noctuoidea
- Family: Erebidae
- Subfamily: Arctiinae
- Genus: Eressa
- Species: E. lutulenta

Binomial name
- Eressa lutulenta (Snellen, 1879)

Synonyms
- Coenochromia lutulenta Snellen, 1879

Species of moth

Eressa lutulenta is a moth of the family Erebidae. It was described by Snellen in 1879. It is found on Java and Sulawesi.
