= Symmoca sutteri =

Scientific classification
- Kingdom: Animalia
- Phylum: Arthropoda
- Clade: Pancrustacea
- Class: Insecta
- Order: Lepidoptera
- Family: Autostichidae
- Genus: Symmoca
- Species: S. sutteri

Binomial name
- Symmoca sutteri Gozmány, 2000

Species of moth

Symmoca sutteri is a moth of the family Autostichidae. It is found on the Cyclades, an island group in the Aegean Sea.
