= Agyrta dichotoma =

Scientific classification
- Kingdom: Animalia
- Phylum: Arthropoda
- Class: Insecta
- Order: Lepidoptera
- Superfamily: Noctuoidea
- Family: Erebidae
- Subfamily: Arctiinae
- Genus: Agyrta
- Species: A. dichotoma

Binomial name
- Agyrta dichotoma Draudt, 1931

Species of moth

Agyrta dichotoma is a moth belonging to the subfamily Arctiinae. It was described by Max Wilhelm Karl Draudt in 1931. It is found in Colombia.
