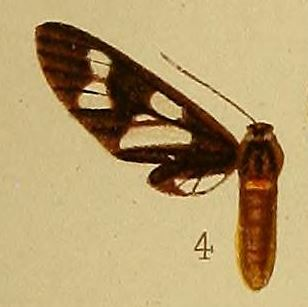
- Eressa pleurosticta

Scientific classification
- Kingdom: Animalia
- Phylum: Arthropoda
- Class: Insecta
- Order: Lepidoptera
- Superfamily: Noctuoidea
- Family: Erebidae
- Subfamily: Arctiinae
- Tribe: Syntomini
- Genus: Eressa; Walker, 1854

Synonyms
- Ctenandra Felder, 1861; Trianeura Butler, 1876; Choromeles Meyrick, 1886

= Eressa =

Genus of moths

Eressa is a genus of moths in the family Erebidae. The genus was erected by Francis Walker in 1854.

== Species ==
- Eressa affinis Moore, 1877
- Eressa africana Hampson, 1914
- Eressa analis Aurivillius, 1925
- Eressa angustipenna (T. P. Lucas, 1890)
- Eressa aperiens (Walker, [1865])
- Eressa buddha Zerny, 1931
- Eressa confinis Walker, 1854
- Eressa dammermanni van Eecke, 1933
- Eressa deliana Roepke, 1935
- Eressa discinota (Moore, 1879)
- Eressa dohertyi Rothschild, 1910
- Eressa eressoides (Hampson, [1893])
- Eressa erythrosoma (Hampson, [1893])
- Eressa furva Hampson, 1898
- Eressa geographica Meyrick, 1886
- Eressa ichneumoniformis Rothschild, 1910
- Eressa javanica Obraztsov, 1954
- Eressa lepcha (Moore, 1879)
- Eressa lutulenta (Snellen, 1879)
- Eressa megalospilia Turner, 1922
- Eressa megatorna Hampson, 1898
- Eressa microchilus (Hampson, [1893])
- Eressa multigutta (Walker, 1854)
- Eressa naclioides Felder, 1861
- Eressa nigra (Hampson, [1893])
- Eressa paurospila Turner, 1922
- Eressa pleurosticta Hampson, 1910
- Eressa quinquecincta Hampson, 1898
- Eressa rhysoptila (Turner, 1922)
- Eressa rubribasis de Joannis, 1912
- Eressa semifusca Hampson, 1898
- Eressa siamica (Walker, [1865])
- Eressa simplex Rothschild, 1910
- Eressa strepsimeris (Meyrick, 1886)
- Eressa subaurata (Walker, 1854)
- Eressa vespa Hampson, 1898
- Eressa vespina Rothschild, 1912
- Eressa vespoides Rothschild, 1910
- Eressa ypleta (Swinhoe, 1892)
