= Symmoca crocodesma =

Scientific classification
- Kingdom: Animalia
- Phylum: Arthropoda
- Class: Insecta
- Order: Lepidoptera
- Family: Autostichidae
- Genus: Symmoca
- Species: S. crocodesma

Binomial name
- Symmoca crocodesma Meyrick, 1911

Species of moth

Symmoca crocodesma is a moth in the family Autostichidae. It was described by Edward Meyrick in 1911. It is found in South Africa.

The wingspan is about 10 mm. The forewings are light purplish grey densely sprinkled with black. There is a moderate deep ochreous-yellow rather irregular-edged medial transverse fascia and an irregular ochreous-yellow spot on the tornus and a slightly larger one on the costa opposite, almost meeting. The hindwings are grey.
