= Agyrta porphyria =

Scientific classification
- Kingdom: Animalia
- Phylum: Arthropoda
- Class: Insecta
- Order: Lepidoptera
- Superfamily: Noctuoidea
- Family: Erebidae
- Subfamily: Arctiinae
- Genus: Agyrta
- Species: A. porphyria

Binomial name
- Agyrta porphyria (Cramer, 1782)

Synonyms
- Bombyx porphyria Stoll, [1782]; Corydalla cryptoleuca Walker, 1856

Species of moth

Agyrta porphyria is a moth of the subfamily Arctiinae. It was described by Pieter Cramer in 1782. It is found in Brazil (Para).

== Subspecies ==
- Agyrta porphyria porphyria
- Agyrta porphyria rothschildi Druce, 1915
