= Kertomesis anthracosema =

Scientific classification
- Domain: Eukaryota
- Kingdom: Animalia
- Phylum: Arthropoda
- Class: Insecta
- Order: Lepidoptera
- Family: Autostichidae
- Genus: Kertomesis
- Species: K. anthracosema

Binomial name
- Kertomesis anthracosema (Meyrick, 1933)

Synonyms
- Symmoca anthracosema Meyrick, 1933

Species of moth

Kertomesis anthracosema is a moth in the family Autostichidae. It was described by Edward Meyrick in 1933. It is found in Kashmir.
