= Eressa rubribasis =

Scientific classification
- Kingdom: Animalia
- Phylum: Arthropoda
- Class: Insecta
- Order: Lepidoptera
- Superfamily: Noctuoidea
- Family: Erebidae
- Subfamily: Arctiinae
- Genus: Eressa
- Species: E. rubribasis

Binomial name
- Eressa rubribasis de Joannis, 1912

Species of insect

Eressa rubribasis is a moth of the family Erebidae within superfamily Noctuoidea. It was described by Joseph de Joannis in 1912. It is found in China.
