= Symmoca minimella =

Scientific classification
- Domain: Eukaryota
- Kingdom: Animalia
- Phylum: Arthropoda
- Class: Insecta
- Order: Lepidoptera
- Family: Autostichidae
- Genus: Symmoca
- Species: S. minimella

Binomial name
- Symmoca minimella Caradja, 1920

Species of moth

Symmoca minimella is a moth in the family Autostichidae. It was described by Aristide Caradja in 1920. It is found in Russia's Ural Mountains.
