= Symmoca christenseni =

Scientific classification
- Kingdom: Animalia
- Phylum: Arthropoda
- Clade: Pancrustacea
- Class: Insecta
- Order: Lepidoptera
- Family: Autostichidae
- Genus: Symmoca
- Species: S. christenseni

Binomial name
- Symmoca christenseni Gozmány, 1982

Species of moth

Symmoca christenseni is a moth of the family Autostichidae. It is found in Greece.
