= Symmoca serrata =

Scientific classification
- Kingdom: Animalia
- Phylum: Arthropoda
- Clade: Pancrustacea
- Class: Insecta
- Order: Lepidoptera
- Family: Autostichidae
- Genus: Symmoca
- Species: S. serrata

Binomial name
- Symmoca serrata Gozmány, 1985

Species of moth

Symmoca serrata is a moth of the family Autostichidae. It is found in Portugal and Spain.
