= Symmoca orphnella =

Scientific classification
- Domain: Eukaryota
- Kingdom: Animalia
- Phylum: Arthropoda
- Class: Insecta
- Order: Lepidoptera
- Family: Autostichidae
- Genus: Symmoca
- Species: S. orphnella

Binomial name
- Symmoca orphnella Rebel, 1893

Species of moth

Symmoca orphnella is a moth of the family Autostichidae. It is found in France, Italy and Spain.

The wingspan is 9–10 mm. The wings are dusted with brownish grey. The hindwings are somewhat darker.
