= Symmoca salem =

Scientific classification
- Kingdom: Animalia
- Phylum: Arthropoda
- Clade: Pancrustacea
- Class: Insecta
- Order: Lepidoptera
- Family: Autostichidae
- Genus: Symmoca
- Species: S. salem

Binomial name
- Symmoca salem Gozmány, 1963

Species of moth

Symmoca salem is a moth in the family Autostichidae. It was described by László Anthony Gozmány in 1963. It is found on Cyprus and in Egypt.
