= Symmoca fuscella =

Scientific classification
- Domain: Eukaryota
- Kingdom: Animalia
- Phylum: Arthropoda
- Class: Insecta
- Order: Lepidoptera
- Family: Autostichidae
- Genus: Symmoca
- Species: S. fuscella

Binomial name
- Symmoca fuscella Amsel, 1959

Species of moth

Symmoca fuscella is a moth in the family Autostichidae. It was described by Hans Georg Amsel in 1959 and is found in Iraq.
