= Symmoca calidella =

Scientific classification
- Domain: Eukaryota
- Kingdom: Animalia
- Phylum: Arthropoda
- Class: Insecta
- Order: Lepidoptera
- Family: Autostichidae
- Genus: Symmoca
- Species: S. calidella

Binomial name
- Symmoca calidella Walsingham, 1905

Species of insect

Symmoca calidella is a moth in the family Autostichidae. It was described by Walsingham in 1905. It is found in Algeria.

The wingspan is 11–12 mm. The forewings are dull white, minutely sprinkled and sparsely spotted with pale brownish fuscous. The ill-defined spots are formed by aggregation of the otherwise scattered pale fuscous scales and are, first a small streak at the base of the costa, reduplicated below and beyond, secondly a subcostal spot at one-third, then a spot at the end of the cell, preceded by one a little beyond the middle of the fold, with another, subcostal, a little before the apex. There are one or two marginal dots before the dirty white cilia which are also slightly dusted. The hindwings are brownish grey.
