= Symmoca saharae =

Scientific classification
- Domain: Eukaryota
- Kingdom: Animalia
- Phylum: Arthropoda
- Class: Insecta
- Order: Lepidoptera
- Family: Autostichidae
- Genus: Symmoca
- Species: S. saharae

Binomial name
- Symmoca saharae (Oberthür, 1888)

Synonyms
- Gelechia saharae Oberthür, 1888

Species of moth

Symmoca saharae is a moth in the family Autostichidae. It was described by Oberthür in 1888. It is found in Algeria.
