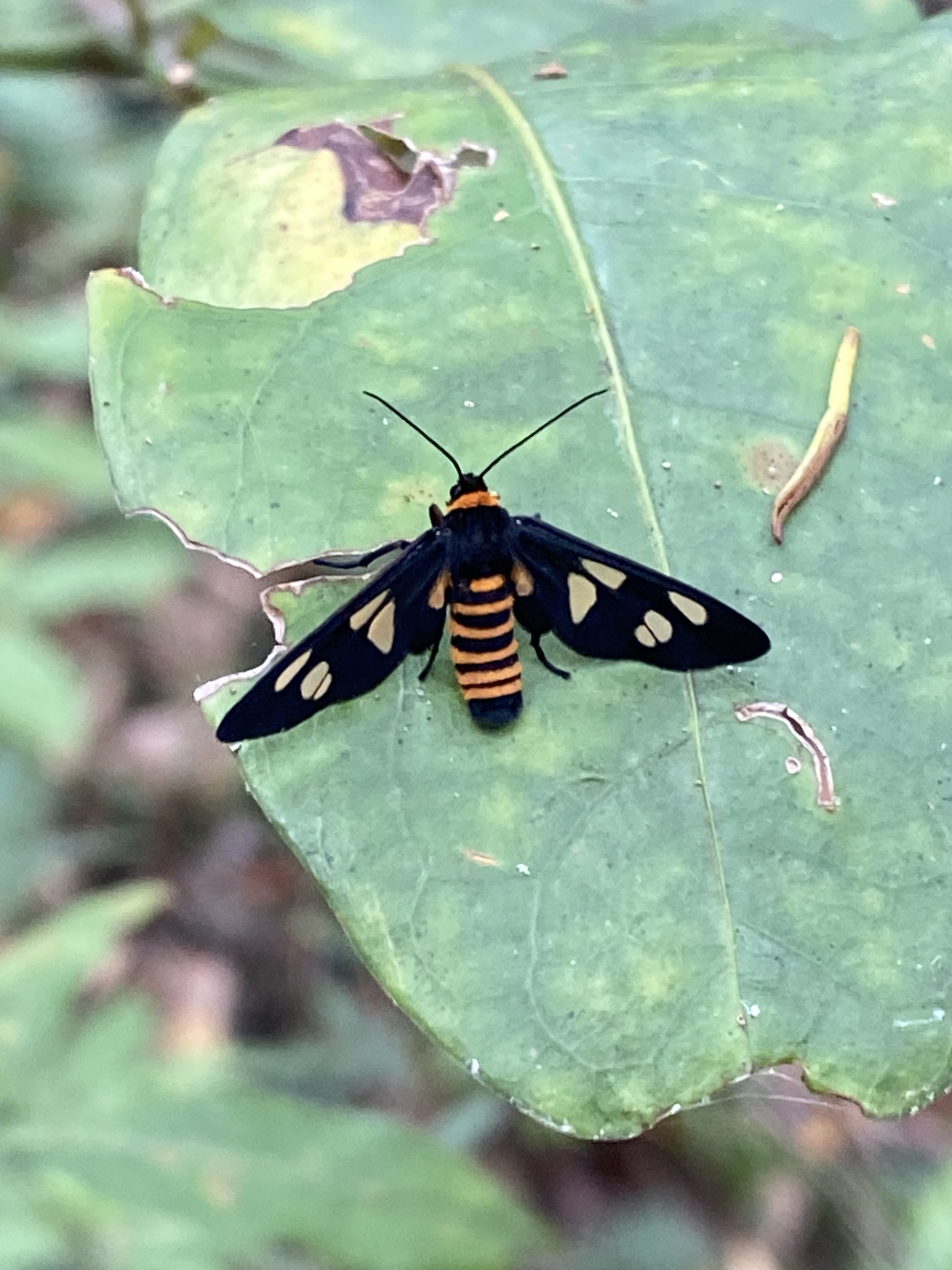

Scientific classification
- Kingdom: Animalia
- Phylum: Arthropoda
- Clade: Pancrustacea
- Class: Insecta
- Order: Lepidoptera
- Superfamily: Noctuoidea
- Family: Erebidae
- Subfamily: Arctiinae
- Genus: Eressa
- Species: E. angustipenna

Binomial name
- Eressa angustipenna (T. P. Lucas, 1890)

Synonyms
- Hydrusa angustipenna Lucas, 1890

= Eressa angustipenna =

Species of moth

Eressa angustipenna, the black-headed wasp moth, is a moth of the family Erebidae. It was described by Thomas Pennington Lucas in 1890. It is found in Australia (Queensland and New South Wales), as well as the Philippines.

The wingspan is about 30 mm. Adults have black wings with yellow-orange translucent spots.
