= Eressa javanica =

Scientific classification
- Domain: Eukaryota
- Kingdom: Animalia
- Phylum: Arthropoda
- Class: Insecta
- Order: Lepidoptera
- Superfamily: Noctuoidea
- Family: Erebidae
- Subfamily: Arctiinae
- Genus: Eressa
- Species: E. javanica

Binomial name
- Eressa javanica Obraztsov, 1954

Species of moth

Eressa javanica is a moth of the family Erebidae. It was described by Obraztsov in 1954. It is found on Java.
