= Eressa rhysoptila =

Scientific classification
- Domain: Eukaryota
- Kingdom: Animalia
- Phylum: Arthropoda
- Class: Insecta
- Order: Lepidoptera
- Superfamily: Noctuoidea
- Family: Erebidae
- Subfamily: Arctiinae
- Genus: Eressa
- Species: E. rhysoptila

Binomial name
- Eressa rhysoptila (Turner, 1922)

Synonyms
- Ceryx rhysoptila Turner, 1922

Species of moth

Eressa rhysoptila is a moth of the subfamily Arctiinae. It was described by Turner in 1922. It is found in Queensland, Australia.
