= Eressa lepcha =

Scientific classification
- Domain: Eukaryota
- Kingdom: Animalia
- Phylum: Arthropoda
- Class: Insecta
- Order: Lepidoptera
- Superfamily: Noctuoidea
- Family: Erebidae
- Subfamily: Arctiinae
- Genus: Eressa
- Species: E. lepcha

Binomial name
- Eressa lepcha (Moore, 1879)

Synonyms
- Syntomis lepcha Moore, 1879

Species of moth

Eressa lepcha is a moth of the family Erebidae. It was described by Frederic Moore in 1879. It is found in Sikkim, India.
