= Symmoca petrogenes =

Scientific classification
- Domain: Eukaryota
- Kingdom: Animalia
- Phylum: Arthropoda
- Class: Insecta
- Order: Lepidoptera
- Family: Autostichidae
- Genus: Symmoca
- Species: S. petrogenes

Binomial name
- Symmoca petrogenes Walsingham, 1907

Synonyms
- Symmoca hispanella Rebel, 1917

Species of moth

Symmoca petrogenes is a moth of the family Autostichidae. It is found in Spain.

The wingspan is about 11 mm. The forewings are chalky white, sprinkled with mixed ferruginous and black scales. The hindwings are brownish grey.
