= Symmoca designella =

Scientific classification
- Domain: Eukaryota
- Kingdom: Animalia
- Phylum: Arthropoda
- Class: Insecta
- Order: Lepidoptera
- Family: Autostichidae
- Genus: Symmoca
- Species: S. designella

Binomial name
- Symmoca designella Herrich-Schäffer, 1855

Synonyms
- Aprominta designella

Species of moth

Symmoca designella is a moth in the family Autostichidae. It was described by Gottlieb August Wilhelm Herrich-Schäffer in 1855 from Banat.
