= Mylothra mithra =

Scientific classification
- Kingdom: Animalia
- Phylum: Arthropoda
- Clade: Pancrustacea
- Class: Insecta
- Order: Lepidoptera
- Family: Autostichidae
- Genus: Mylothra
- Species: M. mithra

Binomial name
- Mylothra mithra (Gozmány, 1963)

Synonyms
- Megasymmoca mithra Gozmány, 1963

Species of moth

Mylothra mithra is a species of moth in the family Autostichidae. It is found in Iran.
