= Agyrta micilia =

Scientific classification
- Kingdom: Animalia
- Phylum: Arthropoda
- Class: Insecta
- Order: Lepidoptera
- Superfamily: Noctuoidea
- Family: Erebidae
- Subfamily: Arctiinae
- Genus: Agyrta
- Species: A. micilia

Binomial name
- Agyrta micilia (Cramer, 1780)

Synonyms
- Phalaena micilia Cramer, [1779]; Bombyx micilia Cramer, [1779]

Species of moth

Agyrta micilia is a moth of the subfamily Arctiinae. It was described by Pieter Cramer in 1780. It is found in Brazil (Pará) and Venezuela.
