= Symmoca dolomitana =

Scientific classification
- Kingdom: Animalia
- Phylum: Arthropoda
- Clade: Pancrustacea
- Class: Insecta
- Order: Lepidoptera
- Family: Autostichidae
- Genus: Symmoca
- Species: S. dolomitana

Binomial name
- Symmoca dolomitana Huemer & Gozmány, 1992

Species of moth

Symmoca dolomitana is a moth of the family Autostichidae. It is found in Austria and Italy.
