= Kertomesis oxycryptis =

Scientific classification
- Domain: Eukaryota
- Kingdom: Animalia
- Phylum: Arthropoda
- Class: Insecta
- Order: Lepidoptera
- Family: Autostichidae
- Genus: Kertomesis
- Species: K. oxycryptis

Binomial name
- Kertomesis oxycryptis (Meyrick, 1929)

Synonyms
- Symmoca oxycryptis Meyrick, 1911

Species of moth

Kertomesis oxycryptis is a moth in the family Autostichidae. It was described by Edward Meyrick in 1929. It is found in India.

The wingspan is about 11 mm. The forewings are dark fuscous. The hindwings are grey.
