= Isostola philomela =

Scientific classification
- Domain: Eukaryota
- Kingdom: Animalia
- Phylum: Arthropoda
- Class: Insecta
- Order: Lepidoptera
- Superfamily: Noctuoidea
- Family: Erebidae
- Subfamily: Arctiinae
- Genus: Isostola
- Species: I. philomela

Binomial name
- Isostola philomela (H. Druce, 1893)

Synonyms
- Eucyane philomela H. Druce, 1893

Species of moth

Isostola philomela is a moth of the family Erebidae. It was described by Herbert Druce in 1893. It is found in Colombia.
