= Kertomesis =

Scientific classification
- Kingdom: Animalia
- Phylum: Arthropoda
- Clade: Pancrustacea
- Class: Insecta
- Order: Lepidoptera
- Family: Autostichidae
- Genus: Kertomesis; Gozmány, 1962

Genus of moths

Kertomesis is a moth genus in the family Autostichidae.

== Species ==
- Kertomesis acatharta (Meyrick, 1911)
- Kertomesis amblycryptis (Meyrick, 1929)
- Kertomesis amphicalyx (Meyrick, 1911)
- Kertomesis anaphracta (Meyrick, 1907)
- Kertomesis anthracosema (Meyrick, 1933)
- Kertomesis corymbitis (Meyrick, 1926)
- Kertomesis dolabrata (Meyrick, 1916)
- Kertomesis indagata (Meyrick, 1918)
- Kertomesis oxycryptis (Meyrick, 1929)
- Kertomesis palacta (Meyrick, 1911)
- Kertomesis rhodota (Meyrick, 1911)
- Kertomesis stesichora (Meyrick, 1911)
- Kertomesis thyrota (Meyrick, 1929)
