= Mylothra christophi =

Scientific classification
- Kingdom: Animalia
- Phylum: Arthropoda
- Clade: Pancrustacea
- Class: Insecta
- Order: Lepidoptera
- Family: Autostichidae
- Genus: Mylothra
- Species: M. christophi

Binomial name
- Mylothra christophi Gozmány, 1967

Species of moth

Mylothra christophi is a moth in the family Autostichidae. It was described by László Anthony Gozmány in 1967. It is found in Iran.
