= Eressa megatorna =

Scientific classification
- Kingdom: Animalia
- Phylum: Arthropoda
- Class: Insecta
- Order: Lepidoptera
- Superfamily: Noctuoidea
- Family: Erebidae
- Subfamily: Arctiinae
- Genus: Eressa
- Species: E. megatorna

Binomial name
- Eressa megatorna Hampson, 1898

Species of moth

Eressa megatorna is a moth of the family Erebidae. It was described by George Hampson in 1898. It is found in Queensland.
