= Symmoca vetusta =

Scientific classification
- Kingdom: Animalia
- Phylum: Arthropoda
- Class: Insecta
- Order: Lepidoptera
- Family: Autostichidae
- Genus: Symmoca
- Species: S. vetusta

Binomial name
- Symmoca vetusta Meyrick, 1931

Species of moth

Symmoca vetusta is a moth in the family Autostichidae. It was described by Edward Meyrick in 1931. It is found in Brazil.
