= Agyrta mathani =

Scientific classification
- Kingdom: Animalia
- Phylum: Arthropoda
- Class: Insecta
- Order: Lepidoptera
- Superfamily: Noctuoidea
- Family: Erebidae
- Subfamily: Arctiinae
- Genus: Agyrta
- Species: A. mathani

Binomial name
- Agyrta mathani Rothschild, 1912

Species of moth

Agyrta mathani is a moth of the subfamily Arctiinae. It was described by Rothschild in 1912. It is found in Colombia.
