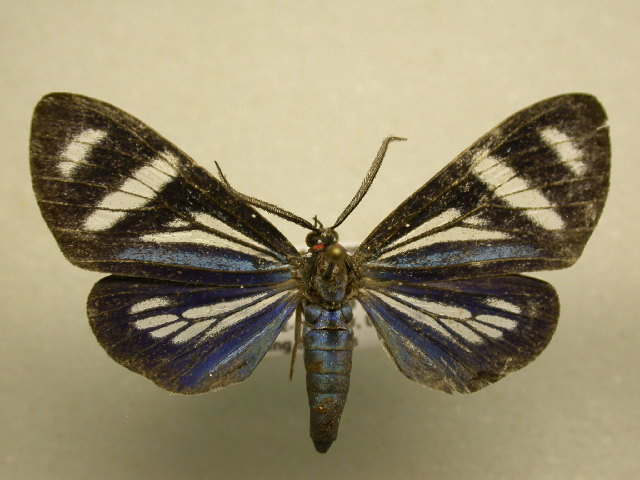

Scientific classification
- Domain: Eukaryota
- Kingdom: Animalia
- Phylum: Arthropoda
- Class: Insecta
- Order: Lepidoptera
- Superfamily: Noctuoidea
- Family: Erebidae
- Subfamily: Arctiinae
- Genus: Isostola
- Species: I. nigrivenata

Binomial name
- Isostola nigrivenata Hering, 1925

= Isostola nigrivenata =

Species of moth

Isostola nigrivenata is a moth of the family Erebidae. It was described by Hering in 1925. It is found in Colombia and Costa Rica.
