= Symmoca caliginella =

Scientific classification
- Domain: Eukaryota
- Kingdom: Animalia
- Phylum: Arthropoda
- Class: Insecta
- Order: Lepidoptera
- Family: Autostichidae
- Genus: Symmoca
- Species: S. caliginella

Binomial name
- Symmoca caliginella Mann, 1867

Species of moth

Symmoca caliginella is a moth of the family Autostichidae. It is found in France, Austria and Italy.

The wingspan is 16–19 mm. Adults are dark grey with black dots on the forewings. The hindwings are ash grey.
