= Eressa geographica =

Scientific classification
- Kingdom: Animalia
- Phylum: Arthropoda
- Class: Insecta
- Order: Lepidoptera
- Superfamily: Noctuoidea
- Family: Erebidae
- Subfamily: Arctiinae
- Genus: Eressa
- Species: E. geographica

Binomial name
- Eressa geographica (Meyrick, 1886)

Synonyms
- Choromeles geographica Meyrick, 1886; Eressa detola Swinhoe, 1892

Species of moth

Eressa geographica is a moth of the family Erebidae. It was described by Edward Meyrick in 1886. It is found in Australia (the Northern Territory and Queensland).

The wingspan is about 20 mm. Adults have black wings with pale yellow translucent spots.
