= Agyrta pandemia =

Scientific classification
- Kingdom: Animalia
- Phylum: Arthropoda
- Class: Insecta
- Order: Lepidoptera
- Superfamily: Noctuoidea
- Family: Erebidae
- Subfamily: Arctiinae
- Genus: Agyrta
- Species: A. pandemia

Binomial name
- Agyrta pandemia H. Druce, 1893

Species of moth

Agyrta pandemia is a moth of the subfamily Arctiinae. It was described by Herbert Druce in 1893. It is found in Pará, Brazil.
