= Symmoca alhambrella =

Scientific classification
- Domain: Eukaryota
- Kingdom: Animalia
- Phylum: Arthropoda
- Class: Insecta
- Order: Lepidoptera
- Family: Autostichidae
- Genus: Symmoca
- Species: S. alhambrella

Binomial name
- Symmoca alhambrella Walsingham, 1911

Species of moth

Symmoca alhambrella is a moth of the family Autostichidae. It is found in Portugal and Spain.

The wingspan is 13.5–14 mm. The forewings are whitish cinereous, dusted and shaded with brownish fuscous. The hindwings are brownish fuscous.
