= Agyrta =

Scientific classification
- Kingdom: Animalia
- Phylum: Arthropoda
- Clade: Pancrustacea
- Class: Insecta
- Order: Lepidoptera
- Superfamily: Noctuoidea
- Family: Erebidae
- Subfamily: Arctiinae
- Subtribe: Ctenuchina
- Genus: Agyrta; Hübner, [1820]

Synonyms
- Corydalla Walker, 1856 (preocc. Vigors, 1826); Evagra Boisduval, 1870

Genus of moths

Agyrta is a Neotropical genus of moth in the subfamily Arctiinae.

== Species ==
- Agyrta albisparsa Hampson, 1898
- Agyrta bifasciata Rothschild, 1912
- Agyrta chena Druce, 1893
- Agyrta conspicua Schaus, 1911
- Agyrta dichotoma Draudt, 1931
- Agyrta dux Walker, 1854
- Agyrta flavitincta Hampson, 1898
- Agyrta garleppi Rothschild, 1912
- Agyrta grandimacula Zerny, 1931
- Agyrta klagesi Rothschild, 1912
- Agyrta macasia Schaus, 1924
- Agyrta mathani Rothschild, 1912
- Agyrta micilia Cramer, 1780
- Agyrta monoplaga Druce, 1898
- Agyrta pandemia Druce, 1893
- Agyrta porphyria Cramer, 1782
- Agyrta pulchriformis Rothschild, 1912
- Agyrta varuna Druce, 1907

== Status unknown ==
- Agyrta lydia Druce
