= Eressa vespoides =

Scientific classification
- Domain: Eukaryota
- Kingdom: Animalia
- Phylum: Arthropoda
- Class: Insecta
- Order: Lepidoptera
- Superfamily: Noctuoidea
- Family: Erebidae
- Subfamily: Arctiinae
- Genus: Eressa
- Species: E. vespoides

Binomial name
- Eressa vespoides Rothschild, 1910

Species of moth

Eressa vespoides is a moth of the family Erebidae. It was described by Walter Rothschild in 1910. It is found in Assam, India.
