= Eressa naclioides =

Scientific classification
- Domain: Eukaryota
- Kingdom: Animalia
- Phylum: Arthropoda
- Class: Insecta
- Order: Lepidoptera
- Superfamily: Noctuoidea
- Family: Erebidae
- Subfamily: Arctiinae
- Genus: Eressa
- Species: E. naclioides

Binomial name
- Eressa naclioides (Felder, 1861)

Synonyms
- Ctenandra naclioides Felder, 1861

Species of moth

Eressa naclioides is a moth of the family Erebidae. It was described by Felder in 1861. It is found in Indonesia.
