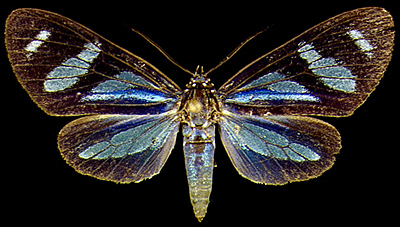

Scientific classification
- Kingdom: Animalia
- Phylum: Arthropoda
- Class: Insecta
- Order: Lepidoptera
- Superfamily: Noctuoidea
- Family: Erebidae
- Subfamily: Arctiinae
- Genus: Isostola
- Species: I. divisa

Binomial name
- Isostola divisa (Walker, 1854)

Synonyms
- Dioptis divisa Walker, 1854

= Isostola divisa =

Species of moth

Isostola divisa is a moth of the family Erebidae. It was described by Francis Walker in 1854. It is found in Brazil and French Guiana.
