= Symmoca revoluta =

Scientific classification
- Kingdom: Animalia
- Phylum: Arthropoda
- Clade: Pancrustacea
- Class: Insecta
- Order: Lepidoptera
- Family: Autostichidae
- Genus: Symmoca
- Species: S. revoluta

Binomial name
- Symmoca revoluta Gozmány, 1985

Species of moth

Symmoca revoluta is a moth of the family Autostichidae. It is found in Portugal and Spain.
