= Symmoca dodecatella =

Scientific classification
- Domain: Eukaryota
- Kingdom: Animalia
- Phylum: Arthropoda
- Class: Insecta
- Order: Lepidoptera
- Family: Autostichidae
- Genus: Symmoca
- Species: S. dodecatella

Binomial name
- Symmoca dodecatella Staudinger, 1859

Synonyms
- Symmoca pleostigmella Rebel, 1917; Symmoca tristella Caradja, 1920

Species of moth

Symmoca dodecatella is a moth of the family Symmocidae. It is found in Portugal and Spain.

The wingspan is about 18–19 mm. The forewings are grey, sprinkled with black, mainly along the margin. The hindwings are grey.
