= Kertomesis amblycryptis =

Scientific classification
- Domain: Eukaryota
- Kingdom: Animalia
- Phylum: Arthropoda
- Class: Insecta
- Order: Lepidoptera
- Family: Autostichidae
- Genus: Kertomesis
- Species: K. amblycryptis

Binomial name
- Kertomesis amblycryptis (Meyrick, 1929)

Synonyms
- Symmoca amblycryptis Meyrick, 1911

Species of moth

Kertomesis amblycryptis is a moth in the family Autostichidae. It was described by Edward Meyrick in 1929. It is found in India.

The wingspan is about 13 mm. The forewings are dark grey. The hindwings are grey.
