= Symmoca albicanella =

Scientific classification
- Kingdom: Animalia
- Phylum: Arthropoda
- Clade: Pancrustacea
- Class: Insecta
- Order: Lepidoptera
- Family: Autostichidae
- Genus: Symmoca
- Species: S. albicanella

Binomial name
- Symmoca albicanella Zeller, 1868

Species of moth

Symmoca albicanella is a moth of the family Autostichidae. It is found in Croatia and Slovenia.
