= Eressa vespa =

Scientific classification
- Kingdom: Animalia
- Phylum: Arthropoda
- Class: Insecta
- Order: Lepidoptera
- Superfamily: Noctuoidea
- Family: Erebidae
- Subfamily: Arctiinae
- Genus: Eressa
- Species: E. vespa

Binomial name
- Eressa vespa Hampson, 1898

Species of moth

Eressa vespa is a moth of the family Erebidae. It was described by George Hampson in 1898. It is found in Myanmar.
