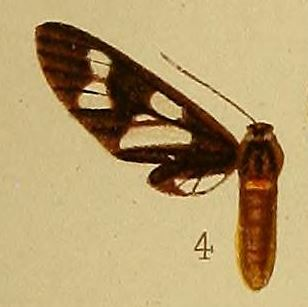

Scientific classification
- Kingdom: Animalia
- Phylum: Arthropoda
- Class: Insecta
- Order: Lepidoptera
- Superfamily: Noctuoidea
- Family: Erebidae
- Subfamily: Arctiinae
- Genus: Eressa
- Species: E. pleurosticta

Binomial name
- Eressa pleurosticta Hampson, 1910

= Eressa pleurosticta =

Species of moth

Eressa pleurosticta is a moth of the family Erebidae. It was described by George Hampson in 1910. It is found in the Democratic Republic of the Congo.
