= Eressa simplex =

Scientific classification
- Domain: Eukaryota
- Kingdom: Animalia
- Phylum: Arthropoda
- Class: Insecta
- Order: Lepidoptera
- Superfamily: Noctuoidea
- Family: Erebidae
- Subfamily: Arctiinae
- Genus: Eressa
- Species: E. simplex

Binomial name
- Eressa simplex Rothschild, 1910

Species of moth

Eressa simplex is a moth of the family Erebidae. It was described by Walter Rothschild in 1910. It is found in India.

The length of the forewings is about 13 mm. The forewings are brown black, with a long hyaline (glass-like) band from the base of the cell along vein one to half-way along vein two. There is a wedge-shaped hyaline patch in the cell, a hyaline patch between veins three and four and four and five, and one between six and seven. The basal half of the hindwings is hyaline and the apical half is brown black.
