= Kertomesis corymbitis =

Scientific classification
- Domain: Eukaryota
- Kingdom: Animalia
- Phylum: Arthropoda
- Class: Insecta
- Order: Lepidoptera
- Family: Autostichidae
- Genus: Kertomesis
- Species: K. corymbitis

Binomial name
- Kertomesis corymbitis (Meyrick, 1926)

Synonyms
- Symmoca corymbitis Meyrick, 1926

Species of moth

Kertomesis corymbitis is a moth in the family Autostichidae. It was described by Edward Meyrick in 1926. It is found in India.

The wingspan is about 12 mm. The forewings are light brownish ochreous, very faintly pinkish tinged, sprinkled with dark fuscous. There is a fuscous spot on the base of the costa. The markings are blackish. There are three small spots transversely placed near the base in the disc. The first discal stigma forms a moderately large spot, the plical a smaller spot beneath it, the second discal absorbed in a direct transverse bar extending to the dorsum, with a short prominence on each side above the fold. There is an undefined spot of dark grey suffusion towards the costa beyond this. There are four irregular approximated dots in a curved series near before the upper part of the termen. The hindwings are grey.
