= Eressa discinota =

Scientific classification
- Domain: Eukaryota
- Kingdom: Animalia
- Phylum: Arthropoda
- Class: Insecta
- Order: Lepidoptera
- Superfamily: Noctuoidea
- Family: Erebidae
- Subfamily: Arctiinae
- Genus: Eressa
- Species: E. discinota

Binomial name
- Eressa discinota (Moore, 1879)

Synonyms
- Syntomis discinota Moore, 1879

Species of moth

Eressa discinota is a moth of the family Erebidae. It was described by Frederic Moore in 1879. It is found in India (Assam, Tenasserim).
