= Eressa semifusca =

Scientific classification
- Kingdom: Animalia
- Phylum: Arthropoda
- Class: Insecta
- Order: Lepidoptera
- Superfamily: Noctuoidea
- Family: Erebidae
- Subfamily: Arctiinae
- Genus: Eressa
- Species: E. semifusca

Binomial name
- Eressa semifusca Hampson, 1898

Species of moth

Eressa semifusca is a moth of the family Erebidae. It was described by George Hampson in 1898. It is found in Peninsular Malaysia and Borneo. The habitat is probably limited to lowland areas.
