= Kertomesis thyrota =

Scientific classification
- Domain: Eukaryota
- Kingdom: Animalia
- Phylum: Arthropoda
- Class: Insecta
- Order: Lepidoptera
- Family: Autostichidae
- Genus: Kertomesis
- Species: K. thyrota

Binomial name
- Kertomesis thyrota (Meyrick, 1929)

Synonyms
- Symmoca thyrota Meyrick, 1929

Species of moth

Kertomesis thyrota is a moth in the family Autostichidae. It was described by Edward Meyrick in 1929. It is found in Sudan.

The wingspan is about 14 mm.
