= Mylothra turana =

Scientific classification
- Domain: Eukaryota
- Kingdom: Animalia
- Phylum: Arthropoda
- Class: Insecta
- Order: Lepidoptera
- Family: Autostichidae
- Genus: Mylothra
- Species: M. turana

Binomial name
- Mylothra turana (Caradja, 1920)

Synonyms
- Symmoca turana Caradja, 1920

Species of moth

Mylothra turana is a moth in the family Autostichidae. It was described by Aristide Caradja in 1920. It is found in Uzbekistan.
