= Isostola vicina =

Scientific classification
- Domain: Eukaryota
- Kingdom: Animalia
- Phylum: Arthropoda
- Class: Insecta
- Order: Lepidoptera
- Superfamily: Noctuoidea
- Family: Erebidae
- Subfamily: Arctiinae
- Genus: Isostola
- Species: I. vicina

Binomial name
- Isostola vicina Butler, 1876

Species of moth

Isostola vicina is a moth of the family Erebidae. It was described by Arthur Gardiner Butler in 1876. It is found in South America.
