= Eressa furva =

Scientific classification
- Kingdom: Animalia
- Phylum: Arthropoda
- Class: Insecta
- Order: Lepidoptera
- Superfamily: Noctuoidea
- Family: Erebidae
- Subfamily: Arctiinae
- Genus: Eressa
- Species: E. furva

Binomial name
- Eressa furva Hampson, 1898

Species of moth

Eressa furva is a moth of the family Erebidae. It was described by George Hampson in 1898. It is found in Sri Lanka and on Buru.

== Subspecies ==
- Eressa furva furva
- Eressa furva buruana van Eecke, 1929 (Buru)
