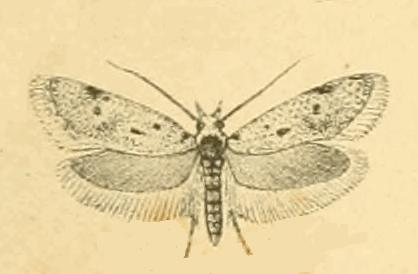

Scientific classification
- Domain: Eukaryota
- Kingdom: Animalia
- Phylum: Arthropoda
- Class: Insecta
- Order: Lepidoptera
- Family: Autostichidae
- Genus: Symmoca
- Species: S. achrestella

Binomial name
- Symmoca achrestella Rebel, 1889

= Symmoca achrestella =

Species of moth

Symmoca achrestella is a moth of the family Autostichidae. It is found in Austria and Italy.

The wingspan is 20–22 mm. The forewings have a greyish ground colour.
