= Agyrta monoplaga =

Scientific classification
- Kingdom: Animalia
- Phylum: Arthropoda
- Class: Insecta
- Order: Lepidoptera
- Superfamily: Noctuoidea
- Family: Erebidae
- Subfamily: Arctiinae
- Genus: Agyrta
- Species: A. monoplaga

Binomial name
- Agyrta monoplaga H. Druce, 1898

Species of moth

Agyrta monoplaga is a moth of the subfamily Arctiinae. It was described by Herbert Druce in 1898. It is found in Ecuador.
