= Eressa dammermanni =

Scientific classification
- Domain: Eukaryota
- Kingdom: Animalia
- Phylum: Arthropoda
- Class: Insecta
- Order: Lepidoptera
- Superfamily: Noctuoidea
- Family: Erebidae
- Subfamily: Arctiinae
- Genus: Eressa
- Species: E. dammermanni

Binomial name
- Eressa dammermanni van Eecke, 1933

Species of moth

Eressa dammermanni is a moth of the family Erebidae. It was described by van Eecke in 1933. It is found on Sumba, an island in eastern Indonesia.
