= Symmoca sorrisa =

Scientific classification
- Kingdom: Animalia
- Phylum: Arthropoda
- Clade: Pancrustacea
- Class: Insecta
- Order: Lepidoptera
- Family: Autostichidae
- Genus: Symmoca
- Species: S. sorrisa

Binomial name
- Symmoca sorrisa Gozmány, 1975

Species of moth

Symmoca sorrisa is a moth of the family Autostichidae. It is found in Spain.
