= Symmoca senora =

Scientific classification
- Kingdom: Animalia
- Phylum: Arthropoda
- Clade: Pancrustacea
- Class: Insecta
- Order: Lepidoptera
- Family: Autostichidae
- Genus: Symmoca
- Species: S. senora

Binomial name
- Symmoca senora Gozmány, 1977

Species of moth

Symmoca senora is a moth of the family Autostichidae. It is found in Spain.
