= Eressa aperiens =

Scientific classification
- Kingdom: Animalia
- Phylum: Arthropoda
- Class: Insecta
- Order: Lepidoptera
- Superfamily: Noctuoidea
- Family: Erebidae
- Subfamily: Arctiinae
- Genus: Eressa
- Species: E. aperiens

Binomial name
- Eressa aperiens (Walker, [1865])

Synonyms
- Syntomis aperiens Walker, [1865]; Trianeura moorei Butler, 1876; Syntomis lydia Swinhoe, 1891

Species of moth

Eressa aperiens is a moth of the family Erebidae. It was described by Francis Walker in 1865. It is found in India (Nilgiris, Bombay).
