= Kertomesis acatharta =

Scientific classification
- Domain: Eukaryota
- Kingdom: Animalia
- Phylum: Arthropoda
- Class: Insecta
- Order: Lepidoptera
- Family: Autostichidae
- Genus: Kertomesis
- Species: K. acatharta

Binomial name
- Kertomesis acatharta (Meyrick, 1911)

Synonyms
- Paradoris acatharta Meyrick, 1911

Species of moth

Kertomesis acatharta is a moth in the family Autostichidae. It was described by Edward Meyrick in 1911. It is found in India.

The wingspan is 13–14 mm. The forewings are whitish ochreous, irregularly marbled with light purplish-grey suffusion irrorated (sprinkled) with black. The dark colouring forms a basal patch containing two short ochreous-yellow streaks from the base and limited by a pale yellowish-tinged line from before one-third of the costa to two-fifths of the dorsum, somewhat angulated and tending to be interrupted on the fold. It also covers the dorsal three-fifths of the rest of the wing, including two or three small yellowish spots beyond the middle, and extending as a fascia to the costa at three-fourths, and along the termen to the apex. There is a small dark spot on the costa before the apex. The hindwings are grey.
