= Mylothra creseritis =

Scientific classification
- Kingdom: Animalia
- Phylum: Arthropoda
- Class: Insecta
- Order: Lepidoptera
- Family: Autostichidae
- Genus: Mylothra
- Species: M. creseritis

Binomial name
- Mylothra creseritis Meyrick, 1907

Species of moth

Mylothra creseritis is a moth in the family Autostichidae. It was described by Edward Meyrick in 1907. It is found in Balochistan.

Its wingspan is 19–20 mm; forewings are whitish ochreous, very finely and thinly sprinkled with fuscous. The stigmata and a pre-tornal dot are very faintly indicated by similar irroration (sprinkles), and the plical is beneath the first discal. The hindwings are a pale grey irrorated with dark grey.
