= Kertomesis rhodota =

Scientific classification
- Domain: Eukaryota
- Kingdom: Animalia
- Phylum: Arthropoda
- Class: Insecta
- Order: Lepidoptera
- Family: Autostichidae
- Genus: Kertomesis
- Species: K. rhodota

Binomial name
- Kertomesis rhodota (Meyrick, 1911)

Synonyms
- Paradoris rhodota Meyrick, 1911

Species of moth

Kertomesis rhodota is a moth in the family Autostichidae. It was described by Edward Meyrick in 1911. It is found in India.

The wingspan is 12–14 mm. The forewings are light rosy pink with a narrow blackish basal fascia. The plical and first discal stigmata are minute and black, the first discal sometimes placed in a small yellowish spot, the plical beneath it. The second discal is represented by a black transverse mark, sometimes surrounded with yellowish, resting on the apex of a transverse blackish dorsal spot. There is a small blackish spot on the costa slightly beyond this and a row of small black dots around the apex and termen. The hindwings are grey.
