= Symmoca cinerariella =

Scientific classification
- Domain: Eukaryota
- Kingdom: Animalia
- Phylum: Arthropoda
- Class: Insecta
- Order: Lepidoptera
- Family: Autostichidae
- Genus: Symmoca
- Species: S. cinerariella

Binomial name
- Symmoca cinerariella (Mann, 1859)

Synonyms
- Oecophora cinerariella Mann, 1859; Eremica siciliana Dufrane, 1955; Symmoca trinacriella Caradja, 1928

Species of moth

Symmoca cinerariella is a moth of the family Autostichidae. It is found in Italy and on Sicily, Corsica and Sardinia.

The forewings are dull ash grey with fine dark sprinkling. The hindwings are also ash grey.
