= Kertomesis indagata =

Scientific classification
- Domain: Eukaryota
- Kingdom: Animalia
- Phylum: Arthropoda
- Class: Insecta
- Order: Lepidoptera
- Family: Autostichidae
- Genus: Kertomesis
- Species: K. indagata

Binomial name
- Kertomesis indagata (Meyrick, 1918)

Synonyms
- Symmoca indagata Meyrick, 1918

Species of moth

Kertomesis indagata is a moth in the family Autostichidae. It was described by Edward Meyrick in 1918. It is found in India.

The wingspan is about 15 mm. The forewings are fuscous with small blackish spots on the base of the costa and dorsum. The stigmata are blackish, partially edged with pale ochreous, the first discal forming a roundish spot, the plical a dot slightly beyond it, the second discal a transverse bar enlarged at the lower extremity and connected with the dorsum by a transverse bar of blackish suffusion. There are indications of cloudy blackish almost marginal dots around the apex. The hindwings are grey.
