= Kertomesis stesichora =

Scientific classification
- Domain: Eukaryota
- Kingdom: Animalia
- Phylum: Arthropoda
- Class: Insecta
- Order: Lepidoptera
- Family: Autostichidae
- Genus: Kertomesis
- Species: K. stesichora

Binomial name
- Kertomesis stesichora (Meyrick, 1911)

Synonyms
- Paradoris stesichora Meyrick, 1911

Species of moth

Kertomesis stesichora is a moth in the family Autostichidae. It was described by Edward Meyrick in 1911. It is found in India.

The wingspan is 11–13 mm. The forewings are whitish ochreous tinged with rosy pink, with some scattered fuscous and dark fuscous scales. There is a small blackish spot on the base of the costa, and one on the dorsum near the base. The stigmata are blackish, the first discal forming a small round spot, the plical dot like, beneath it, the second discal absorbed in a transverse blotch from the dorsum. There is a small blackish spot on the costa slightly beyond this, in one specimen little marked and there are some cloudy undefined blackish dots around the apex and upper part of the termen. The hindwings are grey.
