= Symmoca latiusculella =

Scientific classification
- Kingdom: Animalia
- Phylum: Arthropoda
- Clade: Pancrustacea
- Class: Insecta
- Order: Lepidoptera
- Family: Autostichidae
- Genus: Symmoca
- Species: S. latiusculella

Binomial name
- Symmoca latiusculella Stainton, 1867

Synonyms
- Hypatima latiusculella Stainton, 1867; Symmoca contristella Caradja, 1920; Symmoletria sulamit Gozmány, 1963

Species of moth

Symmoca latiusculella is a moth in the family Autostichidae. It was discovered by Henry Tibbats Stainton in 1867. It is found in Lebanon and Syria.
