= Eressa deliana =

Scientific classification
- Domain: Eukaryota
- Kingdom: Animalia
- Phylum: Arthropoda
- Class: Insecta
- Order: Lepidoptera
- Superfamily: Noctuoidea
- Family: Erebidae
- Subfamily: Arctiinae
- Genus: Eressa
- Species: E. deliana

Binomial name
- Eressa deliana Roepke, 1935

Species of moth

Eressa deliana is a moth of the family Erebidae. It was described by Roepke in 1935. It is found on Sumatra.
