= Symmoca egregiella =

Scientific classification
- Domain: Eukaryota
- Kingdom: Animalia
- Phylum: Arthropoda
- Class: Insecta
- Order: Lepidoptera
- Family: Autostichidae
- Genus: Symmoca
- Species: S. egregiella

Binomial name
- Symmoca egregiella D. Lucas, 1956

Species of moth

Symmoca egregiella is a moth in the family Autostichidae. It was described by Daniel Lucas in 1956. It is found in Morocco.
