= Symmoca degregorioi =

Scientific classification
- Domain: Eukaryota
- Kingdom: Animalia
- Phylum: Arthropoda
- Class: Insecta
- Order: Lepidoptera
- Family: Autostichidae
- Genus: Symmoca
- Species: S. degregorioi

Binomial name
- Symmoca degregorioi Requena, 2007

Species of moth

Symmoca degregorioi is a moth of the family Autostichidae. It is found in Spain.
