= Isostola thabena =

Scientific classification
- Domain: Eukaryota
- Kingdom: Animalia
- Phylum: Arthropoda
- Class: Insecta
- Order: Lepidoptera
- Superfamily: Noctuoidea
- Family: Erebidae
- Subfamily: Arctiinae
- Genus: Isostola
- Species: I. thabena

Binomial name
- Isostola thabena Dognin, 1919

Species of moth

Isostola thabena is a moth of the family Erebidae. It was described by Paul Dognin in 1919. It is found in Colombia.
