= Agyrta macasia =

Scientific classification
- Kingdom: Animalia
- Phylum: Arthropoda
- Class: Insecta
- Order: Lepidoptera
- Superfamily: Noctuoidea
- Family: Erebidae
- Subfamily: Arctiinae
- Genus: Agyrta
- Species: A. macasia

Binomial name
- Agyrta macasia Schaus, 1924

Species of moth

Agyrta macasia is a moth of the subfamily Arctiinae. It was described by Schaus in 1924. It is found in Ecuador.
