= Symmoca longipalpella =

Scientific classification
- Domain: Eukaryota
- Kingdom: Animalia
- Phylum: Arthropoda
- Class: Insecta
- Order: Lepidoptera
- Family: Autostichidae
- Genus: Symmoca
- Species: S. longipalpella

Binomial name
- Symmoca longipalpella Rebel, 1914

Species of moth

Symmoca longipalpella is a moth in the family Autostichidae. It was described by Rebel in 1914. It is found in Egypt.
