= Kertomesis palacta =

Scientific classification
- Domain: Eukaryota
- Kingdom: Animalia
- Phylum: Arthropoda
- Class: Insecta
- Order: Lepidoptera
- Family: Autostichidae
- Genus: Kertomesis
- Species: K. palacta

Binomial name
- Kertomesis palacta (Meyrick, 1911)

Synonyms
- Paradoris palacta Meyrick, 1911

Species of moth

Kertomesis palacta is a moth in the family Autostichidae. It was described by Edward Meyrick in 1911. It is found in India.

The wingspan is about 13 mm. The forewings are whitish ochreous irregularly sprinkled with dark brown and with an elongate black mark along the base of the costa and a transverse blackish spot from the dorsum near the base. The first discal stigma is dot like and black, the second represented by a roundish black spot resting on a transverse-oblong blackish dorsal blotch. There is a moderate semi-circular blackish spot on the costa rather beyond this and a row of cloudy blackish dots around the apical portion of the costa and termen. The hindwings are grey.
