= Eressa analis =

Scientific classification
- Domain: Eukaryota
- Kingdom: Animalia
- Phylum: Arthropoda
- Class: Insecta
- Order: Lepidoptera
- Superfamily: Noctuoidea
- Family: Erebidae
- Subfamily: Arctiinae
- Genus: Eressa
- Species: E. analis

Binomial name
- Eressa analis Aurivillius, 1925

Species of insect

Eressa analis is a moth of the family Erebidae. It was described by Per Olof Christopher Aurivillius in 1925 and is found in the Democratic Republic of the Congo.
