= Kertomesis dolabrata =

Scientific classification
- Domain: Eukaryota
- Kingdom: Animalia
- Phylum: Arthropoda
- Class: Insecta
- Order: Lepidoptera
- Family: Autostichidae
- Genus: Kertomesis
- Species: K. dolabrata

Binomial name
- Kertomesis dolabrata (Meyrick, 1916)

Synonyms
- Symmoca dolabrata Meyrick, 1916

Species of moth

Kertomesis dolabrata is a moth in the family Autostichidae. It was described by Edward Meyrick in 1916. It is found in India.

The wingspan is about 16 mm. The forewings are pale grey suffused with white, with a few scattered dark fuscous scales. The markings are fuscous suffusedly irrorated (sprinkled) with black and with a narrow basal fascia, widest on the dorsum, the edge convex. There are small spots transversely placed, representing the plical and first discal stigmata. A transverse blotch is found from the dorsum towards the tornus reaching two-thirds of the way across the wing, with a strong projection from its anterior edge in the middle of the disc. There is also a small cloudy spot on the costa at two-thirds and a small apical spot, as well as two black dots on the termen beneath it. The hindwings are grey.
