= Eressa ichneumoniformis =

Scientific classification
- Kingdom: Animalia
- Phylum: Arthropoda
- Class: Insecta
- Order: Lepidoptera
- Superfamily: Noctuoidea
- Family: Erebidae
- Subfamily: Arctiinae
- Genus: Eressa
- Species: E. ichneumoniformis

Binomial name
- Eressa ichneumoniformis Rothschild, 1910

Species of moth

Eressa ichneumoniformis is a moth of the family Erebidae. It was described by Rothschild in 1910. It is found in India.
