= Eressa vespina =

Scientific classification
- Domain: Eukaryota
- Kingdom: Animalia
- Phylum: Arthropoda
- Class: Insecta
- Order: Lepidoptera
- Superfamily: Noctuoidea
- Family: Erebidae
- Subfamily: Arctiinae
- Genus: Eressa
- Species: E. vespina

Binomial name
- Eressa vespina Rothschild, 1912

Species of moth

Eressa vespina is a moth of the family Erebidae. It was described by Walter Rothschild in 1912. It is found on Borneo.
