= Eressa multigutta =

Scientific classification
- Kingdom: Animalia
- Phylum: Arthropoda
- Clade: Pancrustacea
- Class: Insecta
- Order: Lepidoptera
- Superfamily: Noctuoidea
- Family: Erebidae
- Subfamily: Arctiinae
- Genus: Eressa
- Species: E. multigutta

Binomial name
- Eressa multigutta (Walker, 1854)

Synonyms
- Syntomis multigutta Walker, 1854; Syntomis blanchardi Poujade, 1884

Species of moth

Eressa multigutta is a moth of the family Erebidae. It was described by Francis Walker in 1854. It is found in Tibet, Nepal, Sikkim and Myanmar.
