= Eressa siamica =

Scientific classification
- Kingdom: Animalia
- Phylum: Arthropoda
- Class: Insecta
- Order: Lepidoptera
- Superfamily: Noctuoidea
- Family: Erebidae
- Subfamily: Arctiinae
- Genus: Eressa
- Species: E. siamica

Binomial name
- Eressa siamica (Walker, [1865])

Synonyms
- Syntomis siamica Walker, [1865]

Species of moth

Eressa siamica is a moth of the family Erebidae. It was described by Francis Walker in 1865. It is found in Thailand.
