= Symmoca pelospora =

Scientific classification
- Kingdom: Animalia
- Phylum: Arthropoda
- Class: Insecta
- Order: Lepidoptera
- Family: Autostichidae
- Genus: Symmoca
- Species: S. pelospora

Binomial name
- Symmoca pelospora Meyrick, 1927

Species of moth

Symmoca pelospora is a moth in the family Autostichidae. It was described by Edward Meyrick in 1927. It is found in Xinjiang, China.

The wingspan is about 17 mm. The forewings are ochreous whitish, sprinkled with brownish. The stigmata are very small and brownish, the plical beneath the first discal. The hindwings are light brown greyish.
