= Eressa erythrosoma =

Scientific classification
- Kingdom: Animalia
- Phylum: Arthropoda
- Class: Insecta
- Order: Lepidoptera
- Superfamily: Noctuoidea
- Family: Erebidae
- Subfamily: Arctiinae
- Genus: Eressa
- Species: E. erythrosoma

Binomial name
- Eressa erythrosoma (Hampson, [1893])

Synonyms
- Syntomis erythrosoma Hampson, [1893]

Species of moth

Eressa erythrosoma is a moth of the family Erebidae. It was described by George Hampson in 1893. It is found in Myanmar.
