= Symmoca attalica =

Scientific classification
- Kingdom: Animalia
- Phylum: Arthropoda
- Clade: Pancrustacea
- Class: Insecta
- Order: Lepidoptera
- Family: Autostichidae
- Genus: Symmoca
- Species: S. attalica

Binomial name
- Symmoca attalica Gozmány, 1957

Synonyms
- Symmoca klimeschiella Gozmány, 1959

Species of moth

Symmoca attalica is a moth of the family Autostichidae. It is found in Greece.
