= Agyrta klagesi =

Scientific classification
- Kingdom: Animalia
- Phylum: Arthropoda
- Class: Insecta
- Order: Lepidoptera
- Superfamily: Noctuoidea
- Family: Erebidae
- Subfamily: Arctiinae
- Genus: Agyrta
- Species: A. klagesi

Binomial name
- Agyrta klagesi Rothschild, 1912

Species of moth

Agyrta klagesi is a moth of the subfamily Arctiinae. It was described by Rothschild in 1912. It is found in Venezuela.

The forewings are velvety black, with a white spot at the apex. The hindwings are black, although the central area from the base almost to the tornus is hyaline.
