= Symmoca ponerias =

Scientific classification
- Domain: Eukaryota
- Kingdom: Animalia
- Phylum: Arthropoda
- Class: Insecta
- Order: Lepidoptera
- Family: Autostichidae
- Genus: Symmoca
- Species: S. ponerias

Binomial name
- Symmoca ponerias Walsingham, 1905

Species of moth

Symmoca ponerias is a moth of the family Autostichidae. It is found in Spain and Algeria.

The wingspan is 12–13 mm. The forewings are pale creamy ochreous, sprinkled with rust-brown scales. The hindwings are dark grey.
