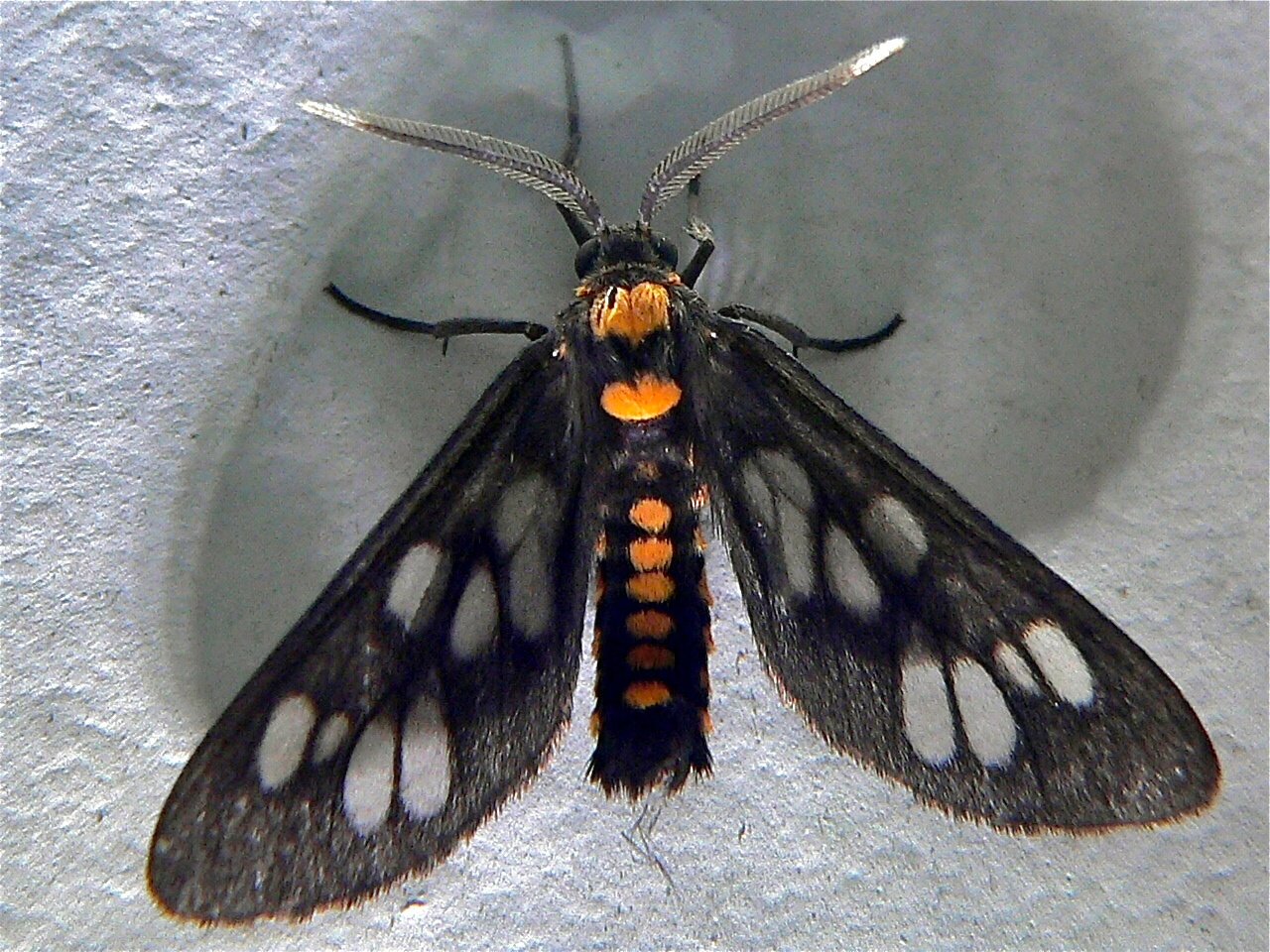

Scientific classification
- Kingdom: Animalia
- Phylum: Arthropoda
- Class: Insecta
- Order: Lepidoptera
- Superfamily: Noctuoidea
- Family: Erebidae
- Subfamily: Arctiinae
- Genus: Eressa
- Species: E. confinis

Binomial name
- Eressa confinis (Walker, 1854)

Synonyms
- Glaucopis confinis Walker, 1854; Eressa musa Swinhoe, 1885; Syntomoides catena Wileman, 1910; Syntomoides finitima Wileman, 1910; Eressa catoria Swinhoe, 1900; Eressa intensa Rothschild, 1910; Eressa malaccensis Rothschild, 1910; Eressa guttulata Stauder, 1915; Eressa confinis ab. trifenestrata Strand

= Eressa confinis =

Species of moth

Eressa confinis is a moth of the family Erebidae. It was described by Francis Walker in 1854. It is found in India (Sikkim, the Nilgiris), Bhutan, Sri Lanka, Myanmar, Taiwan and China.

== Description ==
The wingspan is 20–23 mm. Antennae bipectinate (comb like on both sides) in male, branches short and dilated distally. Antennae serrate (tooth like on one side) in female. Body dull black with a large yellow spot on prothorax and streak on metathorax. Abdomen with yellow spots on vertex and side of each segment. Female has an ochreous anal tuft. Forewings are with a hyaline spot in cell. There is one in interno-median interspace and one in each marginal interspace. Hindwings with a hyaline patch on disk, divided into four by veins.

== Subspecies ==
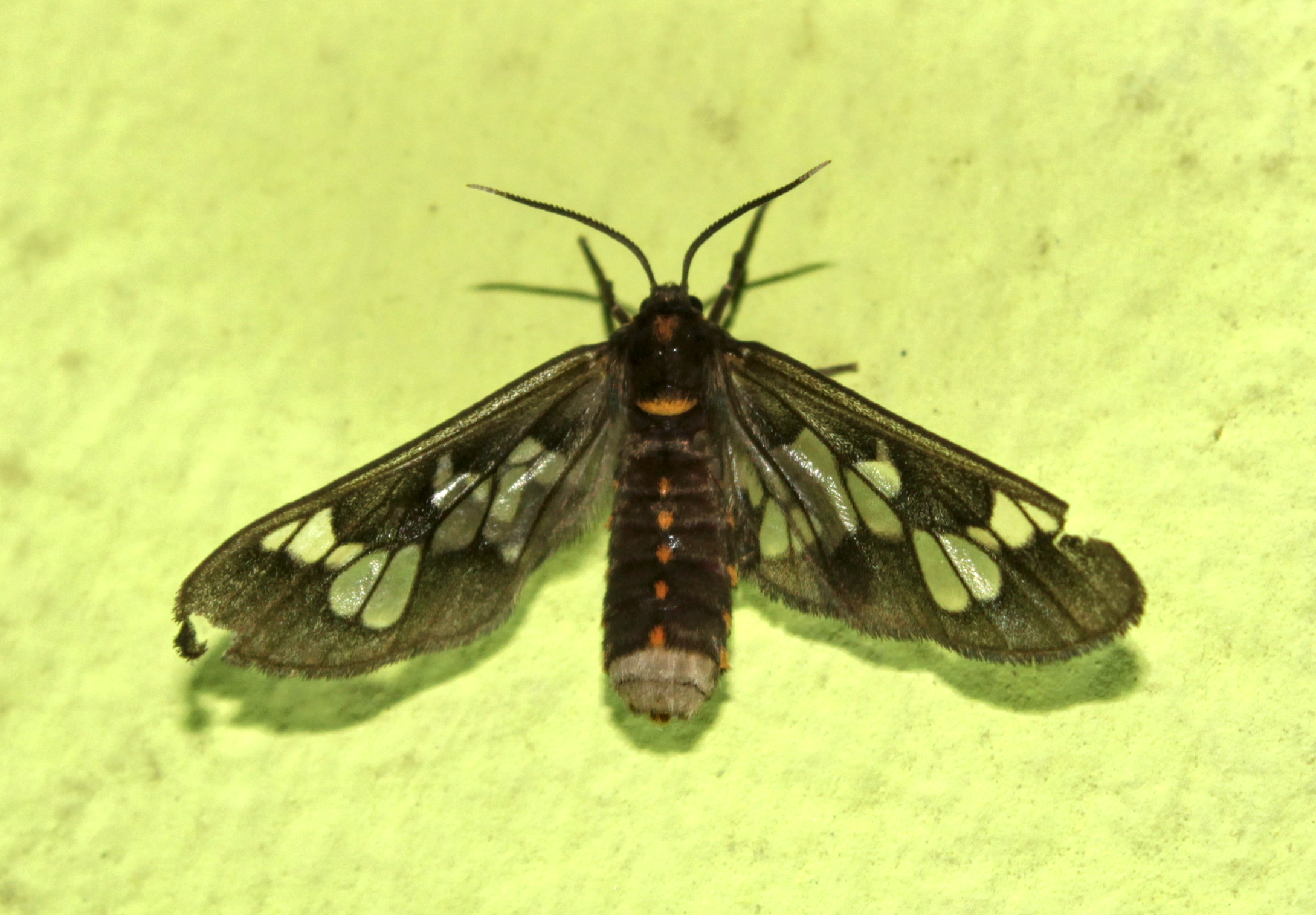
In Kanjirappally, Kerala.

- Eressa confinis confinis
- Eressa confinis finitima (Wileman, 1910) (Taiwan)
- Eressa confinis szechueniensis Obraztsov, 1954 (western China)
