= Kertomesis anaphracta =

Scientific classification
- Domain: Eukaryota
- Kingdom: Animalia
- Phylum: Arthropoda
- Class: Insecta
- Order: Lepidoptera
- Family: Autostichidae
- Genus: Kertomesis
- Species: K. anaphracta

Binomial name
- Kertomesis anaphracta (Meyrick, 1907)

Synonyms
- Paradoris anaphracta Meyrick, 1907

Species of moth

Kertomesis anaphracta is a moth in the family Autostichidae. It was described by Edward Meyrick in 1907. It is found in Bhutan and India.

The wingspan is 12–13 mm. The forewings are ochreous whitish or pale whitish ochreous, thinly sprinkled with fuscous. There is a small blackish spot on the base of the costa. The stigmata are blackish, the plical somewhat beyond the first discal, the second discal connected by a slightly incurved blackish streak with the dorsum before the tornus, followed by an undefined band of darker irroration (sprinkles) from three-fourths of the costa to the tornus. There are undefined spots of blackish irroration around the apex and termen. The hindwings are grey.
