= Symmoca straminella =

Scientific classification
- Kingdom: Animalia
- Phylum: Arthropoda
- Clade: Pancrustacea
- Class: Insecta
- Order: Lepidoptera
- Family: Autostichidae
- Genus: Symmoca
- Species: S. straminella

Binomial name
- Symmoca straminella Gozmány, 1986

Species of moth

Symmoca straminella is a moth of the family Autostichidae. It is found in Syria and Turkey.
