= Agyrta dux =

Scientific classification
- Kingdom: Animalia
- Phylum: Arthropoda
- Class: Insecta
- Order: Lepidoptera
- Superfamily: Noctuoidea
- Family: Erebidae
- Subfamily: Arctiinae
- Genus: Agyrta
- Species: A. dux

Binomial name
- Agyrta dux (Walker, 1854)

Synonyms
- Dioptis dux Walker, 1854; Agyrta aestiva Butler, 1876; Isostola superba Druce, 1884; Agyrta phylla Druce, 1893

Species of moth

Agyrta dux is a moth of the subfamily Arctiinae. It was described by Francis Walker in 1854. It is found on St. Lucia and in Honduras, Guatemala and Venezuela.
