= Hans Zerny =

Austrian entomologist (1887–1945)

Hans Zerny (11 June 1887, in Vienna-Währing – 14 September 1945, in Vienna) was an Austrian entomologist best known for his studies of Lepidoptera.

He studied zoology at the University of Vienna, where in 1911, he obtained his PhD. Afterwards, he began work at the Naturhistorisches Museum in Vienna, serving as an adjunct-curator from 1920 and as curator-first class from 1928 onward. At the museum, he worked closely with Hans Rebel, whom he succeeded as keeper of the Lepidoptera collection following Rebel's retirement in 1932.

He undertook numerous scientific trips throughout Eastern Europe and North Africa. In 1927, he spent 28 weeks on an excursion to the lower Amazon region. From his expeditions, a number of new entomological species have been identified. Also, he is credited with conducting significant research involving South East Asian Noctuidae and members of Neotropical Syntomidae.

He was associated with several learned organizations, being a member of the Zoologisch-Botanischen Gesellschaft in Wien and an honorary member of the Wiener Entomologischen Gesellschaft.

== Selected published works ==
- Die Lepidopterenfauna Albaniens (mit Berücksichtigung der Nachbargebiete), (with Hans Rebel) - Lepidoptera of Albania.
- Die Lepidopteren fauna des grossen atlas in Marokko und seiner randgebiete, 1935 - Lepidoptera fauna of the Greater Atlas Mountains of Morocco and its bordering areas.
- Wissenschaftliche Ergebnisse der ... von F. Werner unternommenen zoölogische Expedition nach dem Anglo-Ägyptischen Sudan (Kordofan) 1914, (with Franz Werner and Otto von Wettstein), 1916–1919.
- Die Lepidopterenfauna von Albarracin in Aragonien, 1927 - Lepidoptera fauna of Albarracín in Aragon.
