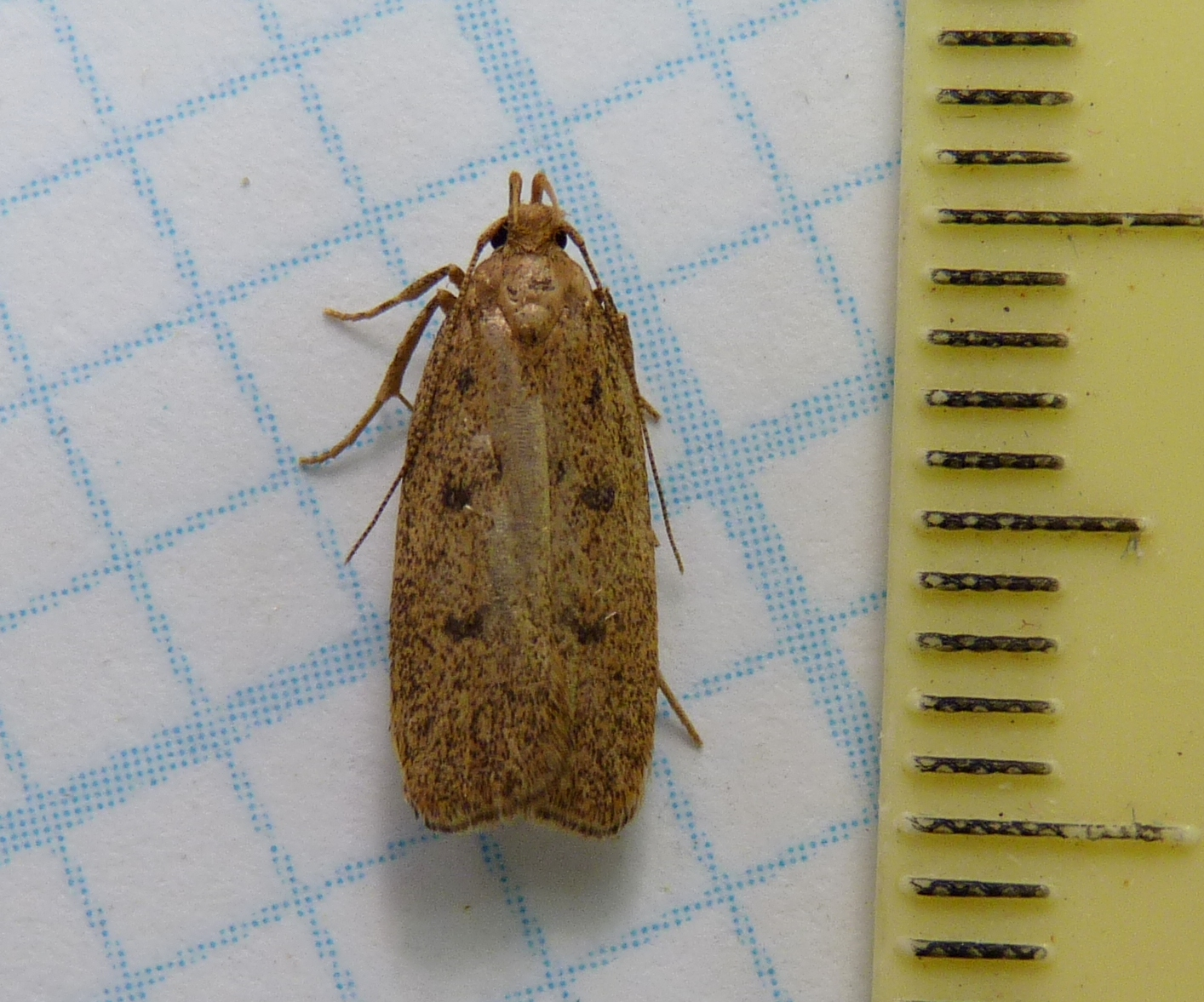
- Glyphidocera septentrionella

Scientific classification
- Kingdom: Animalia
- Phylum: Arthropoda
- Clade: Pancrustacea
- Class: Insecta
- Order: Lepidoptera
- Family: Autostichidae
- Subfamily: Symmocinae; Gozmány, 1957

Tribes
- See text

Synonyms
- Symmocidae; Symmocini (but see text)

= Symmocinae =

Family of moths

The Symmocinae are a subfamily of moths in the superfamily Gelechioidea. These small moths are found mainly in the Palearctic and Africa.

In modern treatments, they are usually united with the concealer moth family Autostichidae.

== History of classification ==
They have traditionally been considered close relatives of the Blastobasidae, where they were sometimes included as subfamily Symmocinae. In arrangements that include the former in the case-bearer family (Coleophoridae) as subfamily Blastobasinae, the Symmocidae were usually treated as tribe Symmocini. Alternatively, they have been united with the Holcopogonidae; in such a treatment the combined group is typically not included in the concealer moth family (Oecophoridae) but treated as distinct family Autostichidae or Symmocidae, with the respective subfamilies downranked to tribes. Another group proposed to be a close relative is the Xyloryctinae, usually included in the Oecophoridae wherever the Symmocidae are. More recently, with additional data and molecular phylogenetic analyses becoming available, the Symmocidae are reinstated as a family in their own right, pending further study of gelechioid interrelationships.

Regardless of their systematic position and taxonomic rank, the group was usually divided into two groups, one centered on Oegoconia and the other encompassing those genera closer to Symmoca. The former is called Oegoconiinae or Oegoconiini and the latter Symmocinae or Symmocini, depending on whether the overall group is treated as family or subfamily. While the overall circumscription and the relationships of the Symmocidae are essentially unresolved, the Oegoconiinae-Symmocinae subdivision seems to be quite well warranted.

== Taxonomy and systematics ==
Genera of Symmocinae are:

Symmocini

- Ambloma Walsingham, [1908]
- Amselina Gozmány, 1957
- Apiletria Lederer, 1855
- Aprominta Gozmány, 1957
- Catasphalma Gozmány, 1957
- Chersogenes Walsingham, 1908
- Donaspastus Gozmány, 1952
- Dysspastus Gozmány, 1964
- Epanastasis Walsingham, 1908
- Metaxitagma Gozmány, 1985
- Nukusa Gozmány, 1963
- Orpecacantha Gozmány, 2008
- Orpecovalva Gozmány, 1964
- Pantacordis Gozmány, 1954
- Stibaromacha Meyrick, 1928
- Symmoca Hübner, 1825
- Symmocoides Amsel, 1939
- Telephirca Gozmány, 1957

Unknown placement

- Acrosyntaxis Gozmány, 1957
- Afrosymmoca Gozmány, 1966
- Aspronympha Gozmány, 2008
- Chionellidea Amsel, 1940
- Concordaxis Gozmány, 2008
- Cornusymmoca Gozmány, 1965
- Dyscordaxis Gozmány, 1975
- Eremica Walsingham, 1904
- Eremicamura Gozmány, 1962
- Gerdana Busck, 1908
- Hecestoptera Gozmány, 1961
- Hieronala Gozmány, 1963
- Indiospastus Gozmány, 1967
- Kertomesis Gozmány, 1962
- Kullashara Gozmány, 1963
- Leilaptera Gozmány, 1963
- Morotripta Meyrick, 1917
- Mylothra Meyrick, 1907
- Nastoceras Chrétien in Oberthür, 1922
- Nestorellus Gerasimov, 1930
- †Oegoconiites Kusnetsov, 1941
- Pecteneremus Gozmány, 1963
- Sagarancona Gozmány, 1964
- Sceptea Walsingham, 1911
- Serendipitia Gozmány, 2008
- Spinitibia Lee & Brown, 2010
- Symmacantha Gozmány, 1963
- †Symmocites Kusnetsov, 1941
- Synchordaxis Gozmány, 2008
- Syssymmoca Gozmány, 1963
- Taygete Chambers, 1873
- Tenieta Amsel, 1942
- Xenoplaxa Gozmány, 1963

Ambloma is sometimes placed in the Symmocinae, but others consider it a member of the Gelechiidae.
