= Amselina parapsesta =

Scientific classification
- Kingdom: Animalia
- Phylum: Arthropoda
- Clade: Pancrustacea
- Class: Insecta
- Order: Lepidoptera
- Family: Autostichidae
- Genus: Amselina
- Species: A. parapsesta

Binomial name
- Amselina parapsesta Gozmany, 1986

Species of moth

Amselina parapsesta is a moth of the family Autostichidae. It is found in Asia Minor.

The wingspan is 14–17 mm. It is very similar to Amselina emir, but the greyish irroration (speckling) is denser and the indistinct spot is larger.
