= Symmocoides gozmanyi =

Scientific classification
- Kingdom: Animalia
- Phylum: Arthropoda
- Class: Insecta
- Order: Lepidoptera
- Family: Autostichidae
- Genus: Symmocoides
- Species: S. gozmanyi

Binomial name
- Symmocoides gozmanyi (Amsel, 1959)

Synonyms
- Amselina gozmanyi Amsel, 1959

Species of moth

Symmocoides gozmanyi is a moth of the family Autostichidae. It is found in Portugal.
