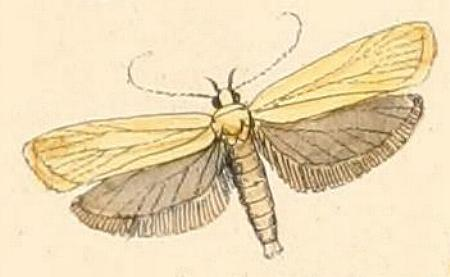

Scientific classification
- Domain: Eukaryota
- Kingdom: Animalia
- Phylum: Arthropoda
- Class: Insecta
- Order: Lepidoptera
- Family: Autostichidae
- Genus: Apiletria
- Species: A. marcida

Binomial name
- Apiletria marcida C. Felder, R. Felder & Rogenhofer, 1875

= Apiletria marcida =

Species of moth

Apiletria marcida is a moth in the family Autostichidae. It was described by Cajetan Felder, Rudolf Felder and Alois Friedrich Rogenhofer in 1875. It is found in Australia.

The wingspan is about 20 mm. The forewings are pale yellow and the hindwings are grey.
