= Acrosyntaxis =

Scientific classification
- Kingdom: Animalia
- Phylum: Arthropoda
- Clade: Pancrustacea
- Class: Insecta
- Order: Lepidoptera
- Family: Autostichidae
- Subfamily: Symmocinae
- Genus: Acrosyntaxis; Gozmány, 1957

Genus of moths

Acrosyntaxis is a moth genus in the family Autostichidae.

== Species ==
- Acrosyntaxis accretans Gozmány, 2008
- Acrosyntaxis anagramma Gozmány, 2008
- Acrosyntaxis anasyra Gozmány, 2008
- Acrosyntaxis angustipennis (Rebel, 1927)
- Acrosyntaxis aorista Gozmány, 2008
- Acrosyntaxis astergys Gozmány, 2008
- Acrosyntaxis brandti Gozmány, 2008
- Acrosyntaxis cyclacantha Gozmány, 2008
- Acrosyntaxis eccelestis Gozmány, 2008
- Acrosyntaxis mahunkai Gozmány, 2008
- Acrosyntaxis micracantha Gozmány, 2008
- Acrosyntaxis rhyparastis Gozmány, 2008
- Acrosyntaxis vartiani Gozmány, 2008
