= Synchordaxis =

Scientific classification
- Kingdom: Animalia
- Phylum: Arthropoda
- Clade: Pancrustacea
- Class: Insecta
- Order: Lepidoptera
- Family: Autostichidae
- Subfamily: Symmocinae
- Genus: Synchordaxis; Gozmány, 2008
- Species: S. synnepha

Binomial name
- Synchordaxis synnepha Gozmány, 2008

Genus of moths

Synchordaxis is a monotypic moth genus in the family Autostichidae first described by László Anthony Gozmány in 2008. Its single species, Synchordaxis synnepha, described by the same author in the same year, is found in Afghanistan.
