= Apiletria nervosa =

Scientific classification
- Kingdom: Animalia
- Phylum: Arthropoda
- Clade: Pancrustacea
- Class: Insecta
- Order: Lepidoptera
- Family: Autostichidae
- Genus: Apiletria
- Species: A. nervosa

Binomial name
- Apiletria nervosa (Stainton, 1867)

Species of moth

Apiletria nervosa is a moth in the family Autostichidae. It was described by Henry Tibbats Stainton in 1867. It is found in Palestine and Libya.
