= Amselina cedestiella =

Scientific classification
- Kingdom: Animalia
- Phylum: Arthropoda
- Clade: Pancrustacea
- Class: Insecta
- Order: Lepidoptera
- Family: Autostichidae
- Genus: Amselina
- Species: A. cedestiella

Binomial name
- Amselina cedestiella (Zeller, 1868)

Synonyms
- Symmoca cedestiella Zeller, 1868; Symmoca dissoluta Staudinger, 1870; Nomialyra goulandriorum Gozmány, 1982; Symmoca paracedestiella Caradja, 1930

Species of moth

Amselina cedestiella is a moth of the family Autostichidae. It is found in Bulgaria, North Macedonia, Greece, Ukraine and Russia. It is also found in Asia Minor.
