= Chionellidea =

Scientific classification
- Kingdom: Animalia
- Phylum: Arthropoda
- Class: Insecta
- Order: Lepidoptera
- Family: Autostichidae
- Subfamily: Symmocinae
- Genus: Chionellidea; Amsel, 1940
- Species: C. leucella

Binomial name
- Chionellidea leucella (Amsel, 1935)

Synonyms
- Chionella Amsel, 1935; Chionella leucella Amsel, 1935

Genus of moths

Chionellidea is a moth genus in the family Autostichidae. It contains the species Chionellidea leucella, which is found in Palestine.
