= Eremica saharae =

Scientific classification
- Kingdom: Animalia
- Phylum: Arthropoda
- Clade: Pancrustacea
- Class: Insecta
- Order: Lepidoptera
- Family: Autostichidae
- Genus: Eremica
- Species: E. saharae

Binomial name
- Eremica saharae Walsingham, 1904

Species of moth

Eremica saharae is a moth in the family Autostichidae. It was described by Thomas de Grey, 6th Baron Walsingham, in 1904. It is found in Algeria.

The wingspan is 10–11 mm. The forewings are dull yellowish white, minutely dusted (almost suffused) with pale brownish. A pair of partly connected spots at one-third, placed obliquely on the disc and fold respectively, are followed by a parallel pair at the end of the cell, all these are darker than the brown dusting around them, and are mixed with a few black scales, these occurring also about the base of the dirty whitish cilia. The hindwings are dark brownish grey.
