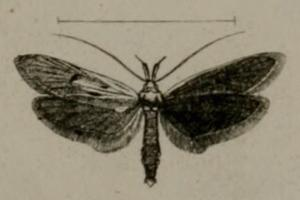

Scientific classification
- Kingdom: Animalia
- Phylum: Arthropoda
- Class: Insecta
- Order: Lepidoptera
- Family: Autostichidae
- Genus: Apiletria
- Species: A. luella

Binomial name
- Apiletria luella Lederer, 1855

= Apiletria luella =

Species of moth

Apiletria luella is a moth of the family Autostichidae. It is found on Cyprus and in Turkey, Syria and Palestine.
