= Amselina eremita =

Scientific classification
- Kingdom: Animalia
- Phylum: Arthropoda
- Clade: Pancrustacea
- Class: Insecta
- Order: Lepidoptera
- Family: Autostichidae
- Genus: Amselina
- Species: A. eremita

Binomial name
- Amselina eremita (Gozmány, 1963)

Synonyms
- Eremica eremita Gozmány, 1963

Species of moth

Amselina eremita is a moth in the family Autostichidae. It was described by László Anthony Gozmány in 1963. It is found in Iran.
