= Amselina aspergata =

Scientific classification
- Kingdom: Animalia
- Phylum: Arthropoda
- Clade: Pancrustacea
- Class: Insecta
- Order: Lepidoptera
- Family: Autostichidae
- Genus: Amselina
- Species: A. aspergata

Binomial name
- Amselina aspergata Gozmány, 2008

Species of moth

Amselina aspergata is a moth in the family Autostichidae. It was described by László Anthony Gozmány in 2008. It is found in Afghanistan.
