= Dyscordaxis =

Scientific classification
- Kingdom: Animalia
- Phylum: Arthropoda
- Clade: Pancrustacea
- Class: Insecta
- Order: Lepidoptera
- Family: Autostichidae
- Subfamily: Symmocinae
- Genus: Dyscordaxis; Gozmány, 1975
- Species: D. pygmeus

Binomial name
- Dyscordaxis pygmeus Gozmány, 1975

Genus of moths

Dyscordaxis is a moth genus in the family Autostichidae. It contains the species Dyscordaxis pygmeus, which is found in the Democratic Republic of Congo (Katanga).
