= Amselina adornata =

Scientific classification
- Kingdom: Animalia
- Phylum: Arthropoda
- Clade: Pancrustacea
- Class: Insecta
- Order: Lepidoptera
- Family: Autostichidae
- Genus: Amselina
- Species: A. adornata

Binomial name
- Amselina adornata Gozmány, 2008

Species of moth

Amselina adornata is a moth in the family Autostichidae. It was described by László Anthony Gozmány in 2008. It is found in Iran.
