= Acrosyntaxis angustipennis =

Scientific classification
- Kingdom: Animalia
- Phylum: Arthropoda
- Class: Insecta
- Order: Lepidoptera
- Family: Autostichidae
- Genus: Acrosyntaxis
- Species: A. angustipennis

Binomial name
- Acrosyntaxis angustipennis (Rebel, 1927)

Synonyms
- Symmoca angustipennis Rebel, 1927

Species of moth

Acrosyntaxis angustipennis is a moth in the family Autostichidae. It was described by Hans Rebel in 1927. It is found in Egypt.
