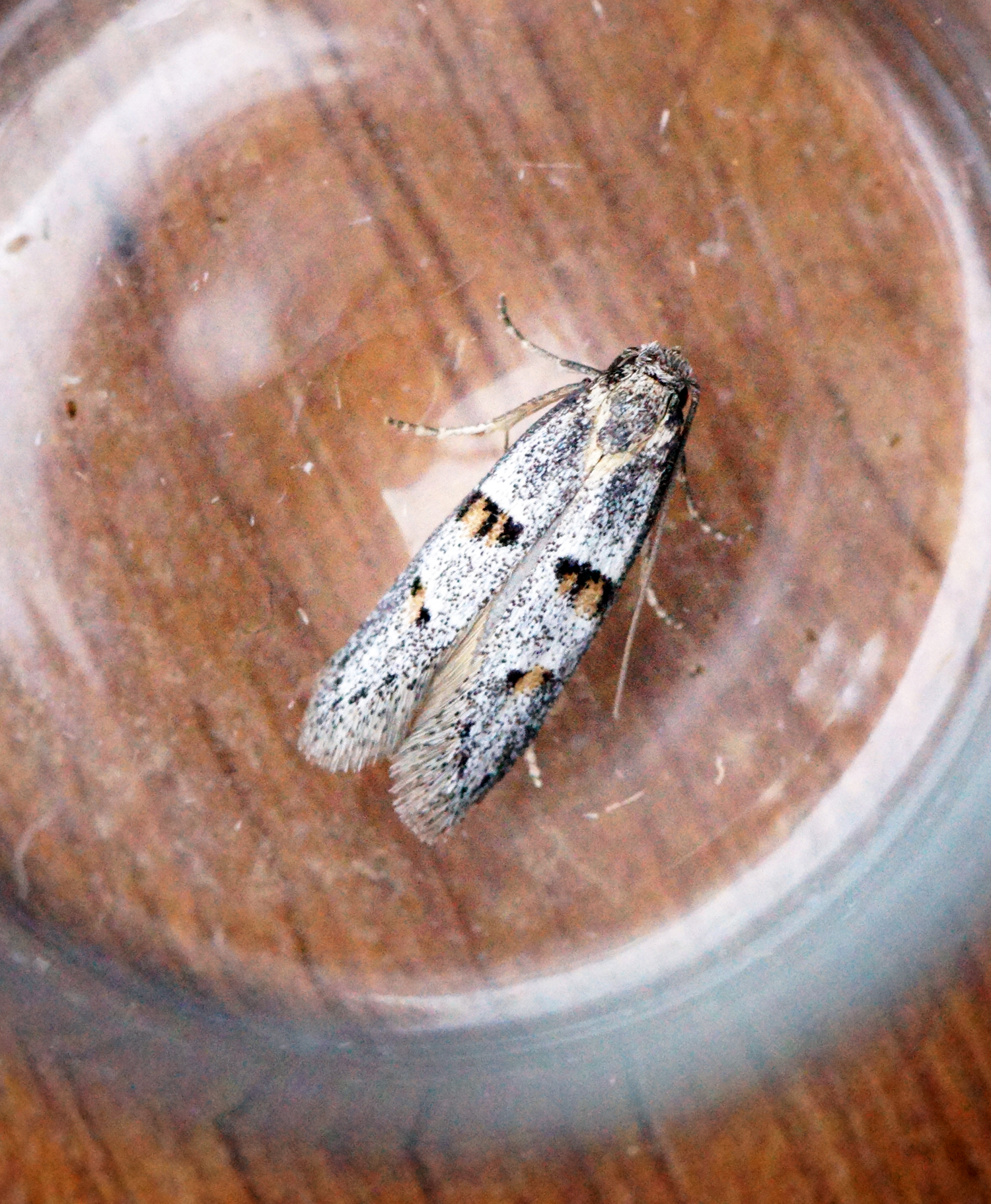

Scientific classification
- Kingdom: Animalia
- Phylum: Arthropoda
- Class: Insecta
- Order: Lepidoptera
- Family: Autostichidae
- Genus: Symmocoides
- Species: S. oxybiella

Binomial name
- Symmocoides oxybiella (Millière, 1872)

Synonyms
- Symmoca oxybiella Millière, 1872; Symmocoides astuta Gozmány, 1961

= Symmocoides oxybiella =

Species of moth

Symmocoides oxybiella is a moth of the family Autostichidae. It is found in France, Italy, Spain and Portugal.
