= Apiletria tripleura =

Scientific classification
- Domain: Eukaryota
- Kingdom: Animalia
- Phylum: Arthropoda
- Class: Insecta
- Order: Lepidoptera
- Family: Autostichidae
- Genus: Apiletria
- Species: A. tripleura

Binomial name
- Apiletria tripleura (Meyrick, 1914)

Synonyms
- Xystoceros tripleura Meyrick, 1914

Species of moth

Apiletria tripleura is a moth in the family Autostichidae. It was described by Edward Meyrick in 1914. It is found in the western Himalayas.

The wingspan is about 18 mm. The forewings are grey suffusedly mixed with light ochreous yellowish, and towards the apex mixed with white. There is a narrow white costal streak from the base to near the apex and a white streak in the disc from one-fourth to the termen, attenuated to a point anteriorly, becoming bifurcate posteriorly. There is also a white streak along the submedian fold from the base to the torus. The hindwings are grey.
