= Amselina olympi =

Scientific classification
- Kingdom: Animalia
- Phylum: Arthropoda
- Clade: Pancrustacea
- Class: Insecta
- Order: Lepidoptera
- Family: Autostichidae
- Genus: Amselina
- Species: A. olympi

Binomial name
- Amselina olympi Gozmány, 1957

Species of moth

Amselina olympi is a moth of the family Autostichidae. It is found in Asia Minor (the Anatolian mountains).
