= Symmocoides ferreirae =

Scientific classification
- Kingdom: Animalia
- Phylum: Arthropoda
- Clade: Pancrustacea
- Class: Insecta
- Order: Lepidoptera
- Family: Autostichidae
- Genus: Symmocoides
- Species: S. ferreirae

Binomial name
- Symmocoides ferreirae Gozmány, 2000

Species of moth

Symmocoides ferreirae is a moth of the family Autostichidae. It is found in Spain. Its type locality is Piedrabuena, Ciudad Real.
