= Hecestoptera =

Scientific classification
- Kingdom: Animalia
- Phylum: Arthropoda
- Clade: Pancrustacea
- Class: Insecta
- Order: Lepidoptera
- Family: Autostichidae
- Subfamily: Symmocinae
- Genus: Hecestoptera; Gozmány, 1961
- Species: H. kyra

Binomial name
- Hecestoptera kyra Gozmány, 1961

Genus of moths

Hecestoptera is a moth genus in the family Autostichidae. It contains the species Hecestoptera kyra, which is found in Kurdistan.
