= Nastoceras =

Scientific classification
- Kingdom: Animalia
- Phylum: Arthropoda
- Class: Insecta
- Order: Lepidoptera
- Family: Autostichidae
- Subfamily: Symmocinae
- Genus: Nastoceras; Chrétien in Oberthür, 1922

Synonyms
- Nastocerella T. B. Fletcher, 1940

Genus of moths

Nastoceras is a genus of moths in the family Autostichidae described by Pierre Chrétien in 1922.

== Species ==
- Nastoceras colluellum Chrétien, 1922
- Nastoceras candidella (Chrétien, 1922)
