= Nestorellus =

Scientific classification
- Kingdom: Animalia
- Phylum: Arthropoda
- Class: Insecta
- Order: Lepidoptera
- Family: Autostichidae
- Subfamily: Symmocinae
- Genus: Nestorellus; Gerasimov, 1930
- Species: N. meyricki

Binomial name
- Nestorellus meyricki Gerasimov, 1930

Genus of moths

Nestorellus is a moth genus in the family Autostichidae. It contains the species Nestorellus meyricki, which is found in Uzbekistan.
