= Morotripta fatigata =

Scientific classification
- Kingdom: Animalia
- Phylum: Arthropoda
- Clade: Pancrustacea
- Class: Insecta
- Order: Lepidoptera
- Family: Autostichidae
- Genus: Morotripta
- Species: M. fatigata

Binomial name
- Morotripta fatigata Meyrick, 1917

Species of moth

Morotripta fatigata is a moth in the family Autostichidae. It was described by Edward Meyrick in 1917. It is found in Zimbabwe.

The wingspan is about 12 mm. The forewings are fuscous, suffusedly irrorated (sprinkled) with white. The stigmata are large, cloudy and darker fuscous, the plical obliquely beyond the first discal. The hindwings are light grey.
