= Orpecovalva glaseri =

Scientific classification
- Kingdom: Animalia
- Phylum: Arthropoda
- Clade: Pancrustacea
- Class: Insecta
- Order: Lepidoptera
- Family: Autostichidae
- Genus: Orpecovalva
- Species: O. glaseri

Binomial name
- Orpecovalva glaseri Gozmány, 1977

Species of moth

Orpecovalva glaseri is a moth of the family Autostichidae. It is found in Spain.
