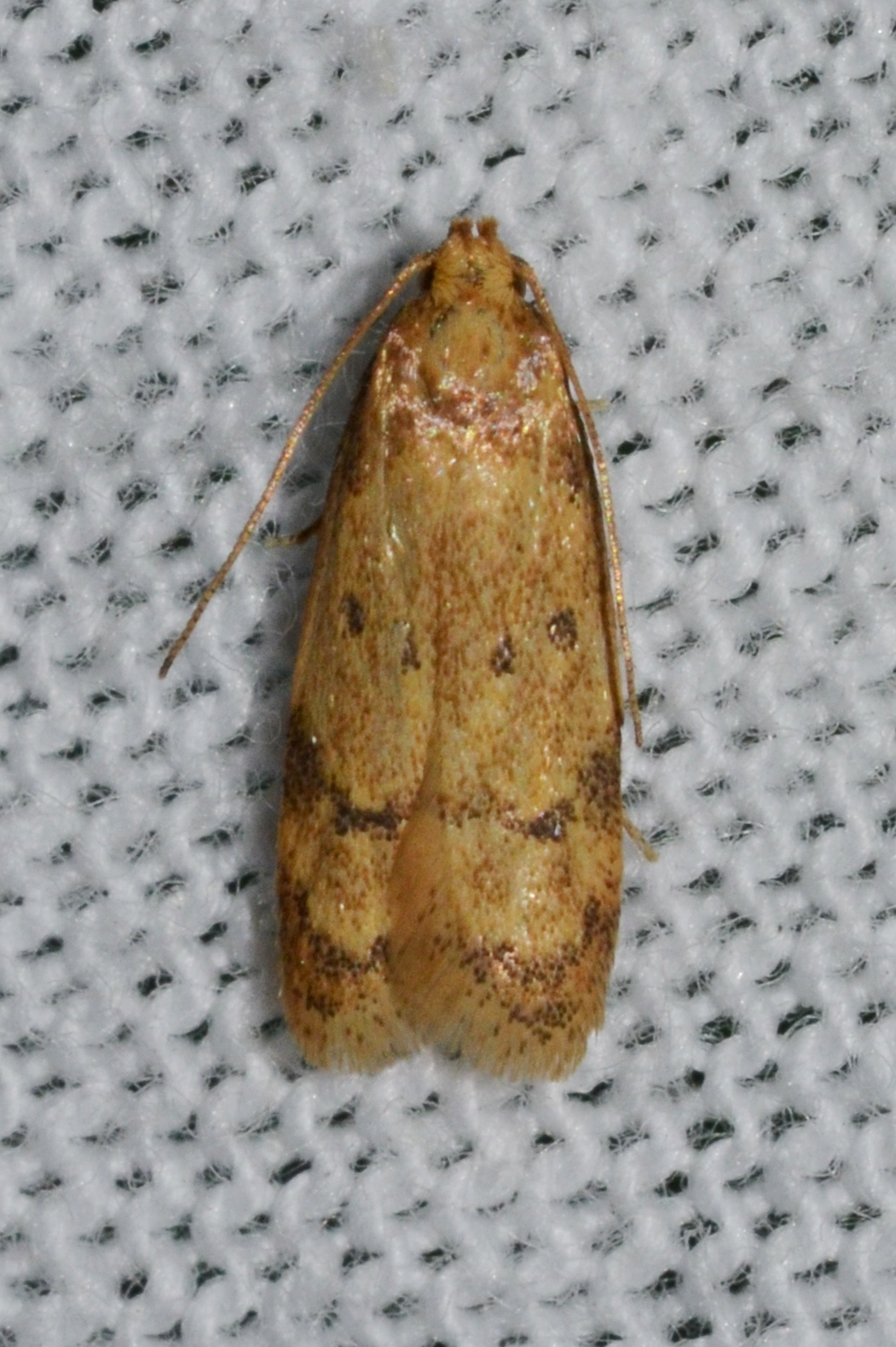

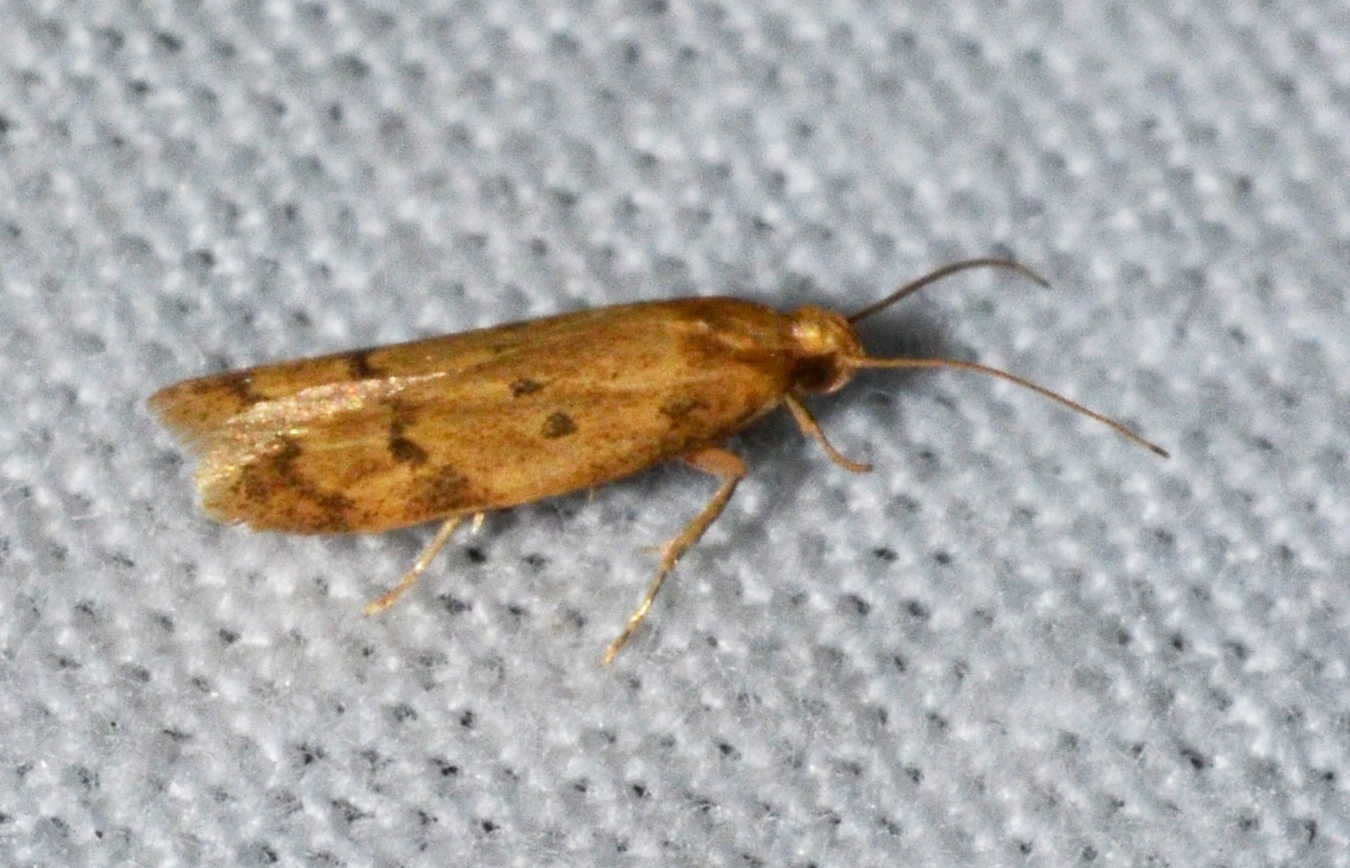

Scientific classification
- Kingdom: Animalia
- Phylum: Arthropoda
- Class: Insecta
- Order: Lepidoptera
- Family: Autostichidae
- Subfamily: Symmocinae
- Genus: Gerdana; Busck, 1908
- Species: G. caritella

Binomial name
- Gerdana caritella Busck, 1908

Synonyms
- Mnesistega telemacha Meyrick, 1927

= Gerdana =

Genus of moths

Gerdana is a genus of moths in the family Autostichidae. It contains only one species, Gerdana caritella, which is found in North America, where it has been recorded from southeastern Canada and the eastern United States.

The wingspan is 13–17 mm. The forewings are light yellow, suffused with darker saffron-yellow. The basal half of the costal edge is darkened with black dusting. The hindwings are whitish fuscous. Adults are mainly on wing from June to August.

The larvae have been recorded feeding on Phoradendron, Picea mariana and Picea pungens.
