= Orpecovalva kasyi =

Scientific classification
- Kingdom: Animalia
- Phylum: Arthropoda
- Clade: Pancrustacea
- Class: Insecta
- Order: Lepidoptera
- Family: Autostichidae
- Genus: Orpecovalva
- Species: O. kasyi

Binomial name
- Orpecovalva kasyi Gozmány, 1988

Species of moth

Orpecovalva kasyi is a moth in the family Autostichidae. It was described by László Anthony Gozmány in 1988. It is found in Morocco.
