= Apiletria apaurta =

Scientific classification
- Kingdom: Animalia
- Phylum: Arthropoda
- Clade: Pancrustacea
- Class: Insecta
- Order: Lepidoptera
- Family: Autostichidae
- Genus: Apiletria
- Species: A. apaurta

Binomial name
- Apiletria apaurta Gozmány, 1965

Species of moth

Apiletria apaurta is a moth in the family Autostichidae. It was described by László Anthony Gozmány in 1965. It is found in Iraq.
