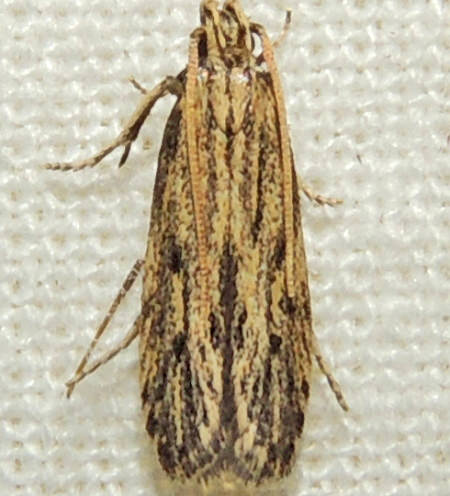

Scientific classification
- Domain: Eukaryota
- Kingdom: Animalia
- Phylum: Arthropoda
- Class: Insecta
- Order: Lepidoptera
- Family: Autostichidae
- Subfamily: Symmocinae
- Genus: Spinitibia; Lee & Brown, 2010
- Species: S. hodgesi

Binomial name
- Spinitibia hodgesi Lee & Brown, 2010

= Spinitibia =

Genus of moths

Spinitibia is a genus of moths in the family Autostichidae. The genus contains one species, Spinitibia hodgesi, which is found in North America and has been recorded in Alabama, Arkansas, Florida, Georgia, Indiana, Kansas, Louisiana, Mississippi, Oklahoma, South Carolina, Tennessee, and Virginia.

The length of the forewings is 5–8 mm, and adults have been recorded on wing from April to October.

== Etymology ==
The genus name refers to the spiniform setae present on the hind tibia.
