= Sagarancona =

Scientific classification
- Kingdom: Animalia
- Phylum: Arthropoda
- Clade: Pancrustacea
- Class: Insecta
- Order: Lepidoptera
- Family: Autostichidae
- Subfamily: Symmocinae
- Genus: Sagarancona; Gozmány, 1964
- Species: S. sericiella

Binomial name
- Sagarancona sericiella (Walsingham, 1904)

Synonyms
- Symmoca sericiella Walsingham, 1904

Genus of moths

Sagarancona is a moth genus in the family Autostichidae. It contains the species Sagarancona sericiella, which is found in Algeria.

The wingspan is 12–14 mm. The forewings are shining, silky, yellowish white, with a faint indication of a group of ochreous scales at the end of the cell, a smaller group in the middle of the fold and one or two on the disc slightly preceding the latter. In some specimens, these spots are absent, while in others not only the spots, but a tolerably plentiful dusting of single scales of the same colour is found, evenly distributed, especially over the outer half of the wing and along the costa, the whole insect thus assuming a more distinctly ochreous tinge. The hindwings are pale, shining, rosy grey.
