= Acrosyntaxis eccelestis =

Scientific classification
- Kingdom: Animalia
- Phylum: Arthropoda
- Clade: Pancrustacea
- Class: Insecta
- Order: Lepidoptera
- Family: Autostichidae
- Genus: Acrosyntaxis
- Species: A. eccelestis

Binomial name
- Acrosyntaxis eccelestis Gozmány, 2008

Species of moth

Acrosyntaxis eccelestis is a moth of the family Autostichidae. It was first described by László Anthony Gozmány in 2008. It is found in Afghanistan.
