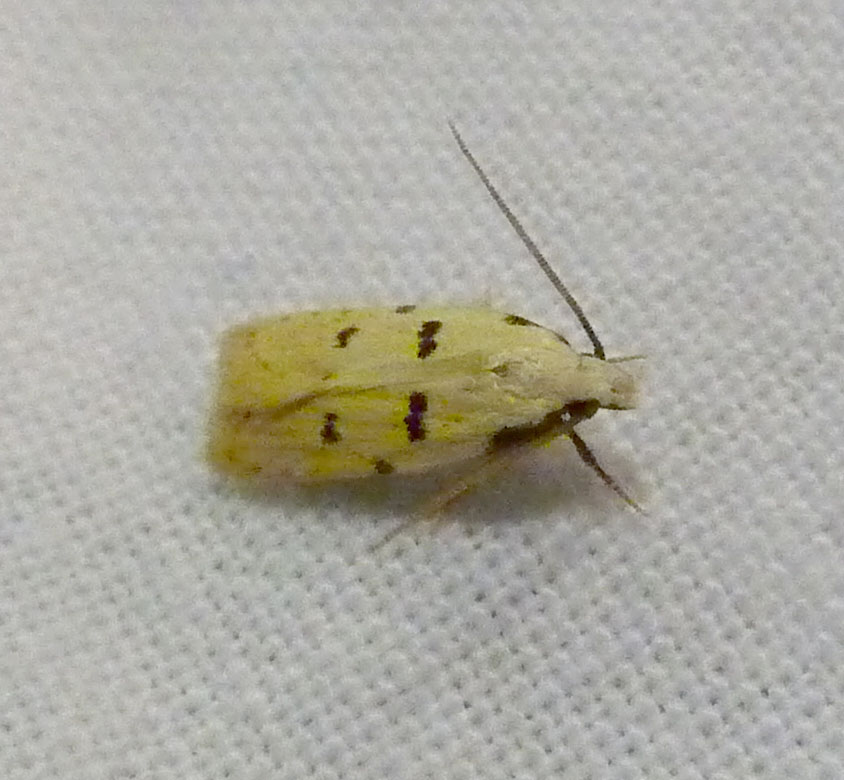

Scientific classification
- Kingdom: Animalia
- Phylum: Arthropoda
- Class: Insecta
- Order: Lepidoptera
- Family: Autostichidae
- Genus: Stibaromacha
- Species: S. ratella

Binomial name
- Stibaromacha ratella (Herrich-Schaffer, 1854)

Synonyms
- Gelechia ratella Herrich-Schaffer, 1854; Stibaromacha sericeella Rebel, 1917; Euteles ratella var. sebdorella Chrétien, 1922; Symmoca viettei Agenjo, 1952

= Stibaromacha ratella =

Species of moth

Stibaromacha ratella is a moth of the family Autostichidae. It is found in France, Spain and Portugal. Outside of Europe, it has been recorded from Morocco, Algeria and Asia Minor.
