= Xenoplaxa =

Scientific classification
- Kingdom: Animalia
- Phylum: Arthropoda
- Clade: Pancrustacea
- Class: Insecta
- Order: Lepidoptera
- Family: Autostichidae
- Subfamily: Symmocinae
- Genus: Xenoplaxa; Gozmány, 1963
- Species: X. seraf

Binomial name
- Xenoplaxa seraf Gozmány, 1963

Genus of moths

Xenoplaxa is a moth genus in the family Autostichidae. It contains the species Xenoplaxa seraf, which is found in Syria.
