= Acrosyntaxis accretans =

Scientific classification
- Kingdom: Animalia
- Phylum: Arthropoda
- Clade: Pancrustacea
- Class: Insecta
- Order: Lepidoptera
- Family: Autostichidae
- Genus: Acrosyntaxis
- Species: A. accretans

Binomial name
- Acrosyntaxis accretans Gozmány, 2008

Species of moth

Acrosyntaxis accretans is a moth of the family Autostichidae. It was first described by László Anthony Gozmány in 2008. It is found in Afghanistan.
