= Symmocoides marthae =

Scientific classification
- Kingdom: Animalia
- Phylum: Arthropoda
- Clade: Pancrustacea
- Class: Insecta
- Order: Lepidoptera
- Family: Autostichidae
- Genus: Symmocoides
- Species: S. marthae

Binomial name
- Symmocoides marthae (Gozmány, 1957)

Synonyms
- Hamartema marthae Gozmány, 1957

Species of moth

Symmocoides marthae is a moth of the family Autostichidae. It is found in Spain.
