= Telephirca =

Scientific classification
- Kingdom: Animalia
- Phylum: Arthropoda
- Clade: Pancrustacea
- Class: Insecta
- Order: Lepidoptera
- Family: Autostichidae
- Subfamily: Symmocinae
- Genus: Telephirca; Gozmány, 1957
- Species: T. quadrifariella

Binomial name
- Telephirca quadrifariella (Mann, 1855)

Synonyms
- Oecophora quadrifariella Mann, 1855; Symmoca ochreopicta Walsingham, 1901

Species of moth

Telephirca quadrifariella is a moth of the family Autostichidae and the only species in the genus Telephirca. It is found on Corsica and Sardinia.

The forewings are black with whitish scales. The hindwings are grey.
