= Stibaromacha ratellina =

Scientific classification
- Kingdom: Animalia
- Phylum: Arthropoda
- Clade: Pancrustacea
- Class: Insecta
- Order: Lepidoptera
- Family: Autostichidae
- Genus: Stibaromacha
- Species: S. ratellina

Binomial name
- Stibaromacha ratellina (Turati, 1919)

Synonyms
- Euteles ratellina Turati, 1919

Species of moth

Stibaromacha ratellina is a moth in the family Autostichidae. It was described by Turati in 1919. It is found in Lebanon.
