= Pecteneremus walsinghami =

Scientific classification
- Kingdom: Animalia
- Phylum: Arthropoda
- Clade: Pancrustacea
- Class: Insecta
- Order: Lepidoptera
- Family: Autostichidae
- Genus: Pecteneremus
- Species: P. walsinghami

Binomial name
- Pecteneremus walsinghami Gozmány, 1967

Species of moth

Pecteneremus walsinghami is a moth in the family Autostichidae. It was described by László Anthony Gozmány in 1967. It is found in Algeria.
