= Nastoceras candidella =

Scientific classification
- Kingdom: Animalia
- Phylum: Arthropoda
- Class: Insecta
- Order: Lepidoptera
- Family: Autostichidae
- Genus: Nastoceras
- Species: N. candidella

Binomial name
- Nastoceras candidella (Chrétien, 1922)

Synonyms
- Symmoca candidella Chrétien, 1922; Symmoca nigricornella Chrétien, 1922; Symmoca gypsomorpha Meyrick, 1928

Species of moth

Nastoceras candidella is a moth in the family Autostichidae. It was described by Pierre Chrétien in 1922. It is found in Morocco.
