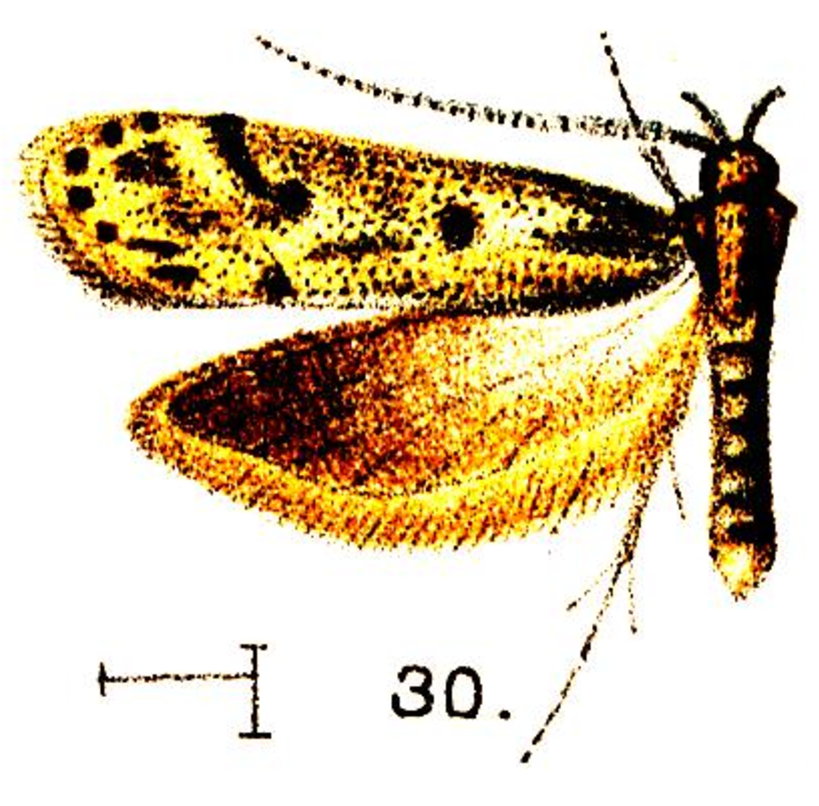
- S. decedens ♂.

Scientific classification
- Domain: Eukaryota
- Kingdom: Animalia
- Phylum: Arthropoda
- Class: Insecta
- Order: Lepidoptera
- Family: Autostichidae
- Subfamily: Symmocinae
- Genus: Sceptea; Walsingham, 1911

Type species
- Sceptea decedens Walsingham, 1911

= Sceptea =

Genus of moths

Sceptea is a moth genus in the family Autostichidae. Its name comes from the Greek σκεπτέα meaning "to be considered".

== Species ==
- Sceptea aequepulvella (Chambers, 1872)
- Sceptea decedens Walsingham, 1911
