= Syssymmoca =

Scientific classification
- Kingdom: Animalia
- Phylum: Arthropoda
- Clade: Pancrustacea
- Class: Insecta
- Order: Lepidoptera
- Family: Autostichidae
- Subfamily: Symmocinae
- Genus: Syssymmoca; Gozmány, 1963
- Species: S. sahib

Binomial name
- Syssymmoca sahib Gozmány, 1963

Genus of moths

Syssymmoca is a moth genus in the family Autostichidae. It contains the species Syssymmoca sahib, which is found in Iran.
