= Amselina virgo =

Scientific classification
- Kingdom: Animalia
- Phylum: Arthropoda
- Clade: Pancrustacea
- Class: Insecta
- Order: Lepidoptera
- Family: Autostichidae
- Genus: Amselina
- Species: A. virgo

Binomial name
- Amselina virgo (Gozmány, 1959)

Synonyms
- Illahasis virgo Gozmány, 1959

Species of moth

Amselina virgo is a moth of the family Autostichidae which is endemic to Crete.
