= Morotripta argillacea =

Scientific classification
- Kingdom: Animalia
- Phylum: Arthropoda
- Clade: Pancrustacea
- Class: Insecta
- Order: Lepidoptera
- Family: Autostichidae
- Genus: Morotripta
- Species: M. argillacea

Binomial name
- Morotripta argillacea Mey, 2011

Species of moth

Morotripta argillacea is a moth in the family Autostichidae. It was described by Wolfram Mey in 2011. It is found in South Africa's Western Cape province.
