= Pecteneremus pharaoh =

Scientific classification
- Kingdom: Animalia
- Phylum: Arthropoda
- Clade: Pancrustacea
- Class: Insecta
- Order: Lepidoptera
- Family: Autostichidae
- Genus: Pecteneremus
- Species: P. pharaoh

Binomial name
- Pecteneremus pharaoh Gozmány, 1963

Species of moth

Pecteneremus pharaoh is a moth in the family Autostichidae. It was described by László Anthony Gozmány in 1963. It is found in Algeria.
