= Amselina =

Scientific classification
- Kingdom: Animalia
- Phylum: Arthropoda
- Clade: Pancrustacea
- Class: Insecta
- Order: Lepidoptera
- Family: Autostichidae
- Tribe: Symmocini
- Genus: Amselina; Gozmány, 1957

Synonyms
- Eremicamina Gozmány, 1964; Illahasis Gozmány, 1959; Nomialyra Gozmány, 1982

Genus of moths

Amselina is a genus of small moths in the family Autostichidae (subfamily Symmocinae).

== Species ==
- Amselina adornata Gozmány, 2008
- Amselina africana Gozmány, 2008
- Amselina amaura Gozmány, 2008
- Amselina aspergata Gozmány, 2008
- Amselina cedestiella (Zeller, 1868)
- Amselina effendi (Gozmány, 1963)
- Amselina emir (Gozmány, 1961)
- Amselina eremita (Gozmány, 1963)
- Amselina kasyi (Gozmány, 1961)
- Amselina manisadjiani Gozmány, 2008
- Amselina minorita Gozmany, 1968
- Amselina monorita (Gozmány, 1969)
- Amselina odynera Gozmány, 2008
- Amselina olympi Gozmány, 1957
- Amselina parapsesta Gozmány, 1986
- Amselina stagonophora Gozmány, 2008
- Amselina virgo (Gozmány, 1959)
- Amselina wiltshirei (Gozmány, 1963)
