= Hieronala =

Scientific classification
- Kingdom: Animalia
- Phylum: Arthropoda
- Clade: Pancrustacea
- Class: Insecta
- Order: Lepidoptera
- Family: Autostichidae
- Subfamily: Symmocinae
- Genus: Hieronala; Gozmány, 1963
- Species: H. huri

Binomial name
- Hieronala huri Gozmány, 1963

Genus of moths

Hieronala is a moth genus in the family Autostichidae. It contains the species Hieronala huri, which is found in Afghanistan.
