= Eremicamura =

Scientific classification
- Kingdom: Animalia
- Phylum: Arthropoda
- Clade: Pancrustacea
- Class: Insecta
- Order: Lepidoptera
- Family: Autostichidae
- Subfamily: Symmocinae
- Genus: Eremicamura; Gozmány, 1962
- Species: E. mercuriata

Binomial name
- Eremicamura mercuriata Gozmány, 1962

Genus of moths

Eremicamura is a moth genus in the family Autostichidae. It contains the species Eremicamura mercuriata, which is found in the Russian Far East (Amur).
