= Indiospastus =

Scientific classification
- Kingdom: Animalia
- Phylum: Arthropoda
- Clade: Pancrustacea
- Class: Insecta
- Order: Lepidoptera
- Family: Autostichidae
- Subfamily: Symmocinae
- Genus: Indiospastus; Gozmány, 1967
- Species: I. epenthetica

Binomial name
- Indiospastus epenthetica (Meyrick, 1931)

Synonyms
- Symmoca epenthetica Meyrick, 1931

Genus of moths

Indiospastus is a moth genus in the family Autostichidae. It contains the species Indiospastus epenthetica, which is found in India (Sikkim).
