= Sceptea aequepulvella =

Scientific classification
- Kingdom: Animalia
- Phylum: Arthropoda
- Clade: Pancrustacea
- Class: Insecta
- Order: Lepidoptera
- Family: Autostichidae
- Genus: Sceptea
- Species: S. aequepulvella

Binomial name
- Sceptea aequepulvella (Chambers, 1872)

Synonyms
- Gelechia aequepulvella Chambers, 1872; Glyphidocera aberratella Busck, 1907

Species of moth

Sceptea aequepulvella is a moth in the family Autostichidae. It was described by Vactor Tousey Chambers in 1872. It is found in North America, where it has been recorded from California, the District of Columbia, Florida, Illinois, Indiana, Kentucky, Maine, Maryland, Mississippi, New Jersey, North Carolina, Ohio, Pennsylvania, South Carolina, Virginia and West Virginia.

The wingspan is about 14 mm. The forewings are ocherous brown, heavily overlaid with black scales especially along the edges and towards the apex. At the end of the cell is a poorly defined blackish dot and on the middle of the fold is a similar dot. The hindwings are bluish fuscous.
