= Orpecovalva mallorcae =

Scientific classification
- Kingdom: Animalia
- Phylum: Arthropoda
- Clade: Pancrustacea
- Class: Insecta
- Order: Lepidoptera
- Family: Autostichidae
- Genus: Orpecovalva
- Species: O. mallorcae

Binomial name
- Orpecovalva mallorcae Gozmány, 1975

Species of moth

Orpecovalva mallorcae is a moth of the family Autostichidae. It is found on the Balearic Islands in the Mediterranean Sea.
