= Concordaxis =

Scientific classification
- Kingdom: Animalia
- Phylum: Arthropoda
- Clade: Pancrustacea
- Class: Insecta
- Order: Lepidoptera
- Family: Autostichidae
- Subfamily: Symmocinae
- Genus: Concordaxis; Gozmány, 2008
- Species: C. convergens

Binomial name
- Concordaxis convergens Gozmány, 2008

Genus of moths

Concordaxis is a monotypic moth genus in the family Autostichidae first described by László Anthony Gozmány in 2008. Its single species, Concordaxis convergens, described by the same author in the same year, is found in Iran.
