= Tenieta evae =

Scientific classification
- Kingdom: Animalia
- Phylum: Arthropoda
- Clade: Pancrustacea
- Class: Insecta
- Order: Lepidoptera
- Family: Autostichidae
- Genus: Tenieta
- Species: T. evae

Binomial name
- Tenieta evae Gozmány, 1967

Species of moth

Tenieta evae is a moth in the family Autostichidae. It was described by László Anthony Gozmány in 1967. It is found in Mauritania and Algeria.
