= Apiletria asirica =

Scientific classification
- Kingdom: Animalia
- Phylum: Arthropoda
- Clade: Pancrustacea
- Class: Insecta
- Order: Lepidoptera
- Family: Autostichidae
- Genus: Apiletria
- Species: A. asirica

Binomial name
- Apiletria asirica Gozmány, 1982

Species of moth

Apiletria asirica is a moth in the family Autostichidae. It was described by László Anthony Gozmány in 1982. It is found in Saudi Arabia.
