= Leilaptera =

Scientific classification
- Kingdom: Animalia
- Phylum: Arthropoda
- Clade: Pancrustacea
- Class: Insecta
- Order: Lepidoptera
- Family: Autostichidae
- Subfamily: Symmocinae
- Genus: Leilaptera; Gozmány, 1963
- Species: L. lithochroma

Binomial name
- Leilaptera lithochroma (Walsingham, 1904)

Synonyms
- Eremica lithochroma Walsingham, 1904

Genus of moths

Leilaptera is a moth genus in the family Autostichidae. It contains the species Leilaptera lithochroma, which is found in Algeria.

The wingspan is 10–11 mm. The forewings are uniform pale stone-ochreous, a few scattered brown scales towards the apex and a minute spot of darker brown at the lower angle of the cell. The hindwings are pale grey.
