= Stibaromacha =

Scientific classification
- Kingdom: Animalia
- Phylum: Arthropoda
- Class: Insecta
- Order: Lepidoptera
- Family: Autostichidae
- Subfamily: Symmocinae
- Genus: Stibaromacha; Meyrick, 1928

Genus of moths

Stibaromacha is a moth genus in the family Autostichidae.

== Species ==
- Stibaromacha ratella (Herrich-Schäffer, 1854)
- Stibaromacha ratellina (Turati, 1919)
