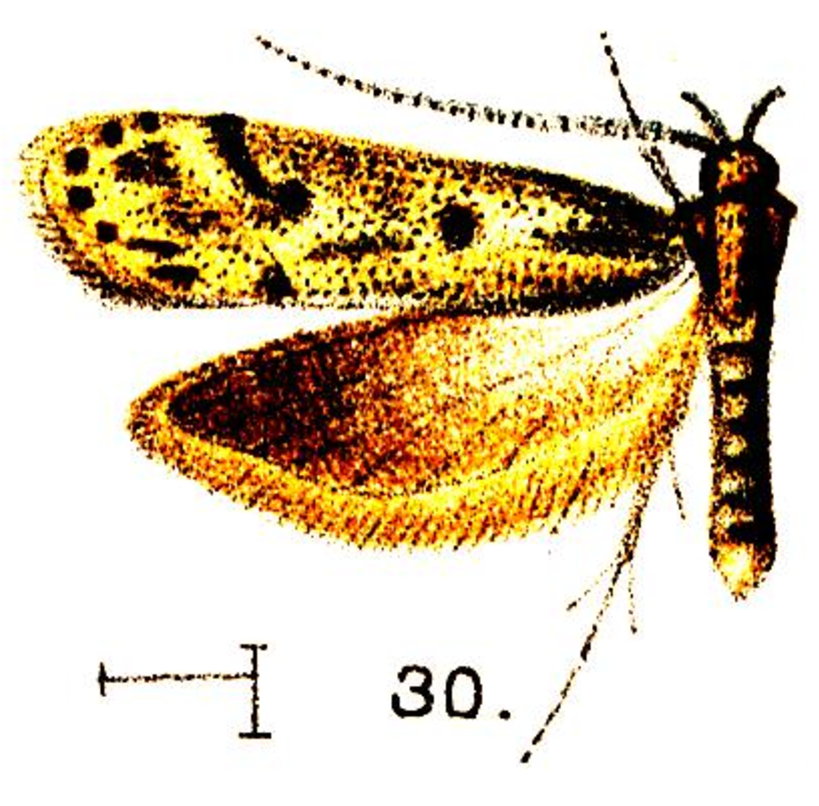

Scientific classification
- Domain: Eukaryota
- Kingdom: Animalia
- Phylum: Arthropoda
- Class: Insecta
- Order: Lepidoptera
- Family: Autostichidae
- Genus: Sceptea
- Species: S. decedens

Binomial name
- Sceptea decedens Walsingham, 1911

= Sceptea decedens =

Species of moth

Sceptea decedens is a moth in the family Autostichidae. It was described by Thomas de Grey, 6th Baron Walsingham, in 1911. It is found in Mexico (Tabasco).

The wingspan is about 9 mm. The forewings are pale ochreous, suffused and sprinkled with olivaceous fuscous, tending to become concentrated in an ill-defined streak along the fold, a spot on the middle of the cell, another at the end of the cell becoming absorbed in an indistinct oblique transverse fascia from costal to dorsal the cilia, a subterminal shade, and a few dark spots around the apex and termen. The hindwings are brownish grey.
