= Pecteneremus =

Scientific classification
- Kingdom: Animalia
- Phylum: Arthropoda
- Clade: Pancrustacea
- Class: Insecta
- Order: Lepidoptera
- Family: Autostichidae
- Subfamily: Symmocinae
- Genus: Pecteneremus; Gozmány, 1963

Genus of moths

Pecteneremus is a moth genus in the family Autostichidae.

== Species ==
- Pecteneremus albella (Amsel, 1959)
- Pecteneremus decipiens Gozmány, 1967
- Pecteneremus padishah Gozmány, 1963
- Pecteneremus pharaoh Gozmány, 1963
- Pecteneremus pilatus Gozmány, 1963
- Pecteneremus walsinghami Gozmány, 1967
