= Pecteneremus albella =

Scientific classification
- Domain: Eukaryota
- Kingdom: Animalia
- Phylum: Arthropoda
- Class: Insecta
- Order: Lepidoptera
- Family: Autostichidae
- Genus: Pecteneremus
- Species: P. albella

Binomial name
- Pecteneremus albella (Amsel, 1959)

Synonyms
- Eremica albella Amsel, 1959; Eremica griseella Amsel, 1959

Species of moth

Pecteneremus albella is a moth in the family Autostichidae. It was described by Hans Georg Amsel in 1959 and is found in Iran.
