= Orpecovalva acantha =

Scientific classification
- Kingdom: Animalia
- Phylum: Arthropoda
- Clade: Pancrustacea
- Class: Insecta
- Order: Lepidoptera
- Family: Autostichidae
- Genus: Orpecovalva
- Species: O. acantha

Binomial name
- Orpecovalva acantha (Gozmány, 1963)

Synonyms
- Amselina acantha Gozmány, 1963

Species of moth

Orpecovalva acantha is a moth of the family Autostichidae. It is found on Sardinia.
