= Catasphalma =

Scientific classification
- Kingdom: Animalia
- Phylum: Arthropoda
- Clade: Pancrustacea
- Class: Insecta
- Order: Lepidoptera
- Family: Autostichidae
- Subfamily: Symmocinae
- Genus: Catasphalma; Gozmány, 1957
- Species: C. kautziella

Binomial name
- Catasphalma kautziella (Rebel, 1935)

Synonyms
- Symmoca kautziella Rebel, 1935

Species of moth

Catasphalma kautziella is a moth of the Autostichidae and the only species in the genus Catasphalma. It is found in Portugal and Spain.
