= Symmocoides =

Scientific classification
- Kingdom: Animalia
- Phylum: Arthropoda
- Class: Insecta
- Order: Lepidoptera
- Family: Autostichidae
- Subfamily: Symmocinae
- Tribe: Symmocini
- Genus: Symmocoides; Amsel in Hartig & Amsel, 1939

Synonyms
- Hamartema Gozmány, 1957

Genus of moths

Symmocoides is a genus of moths in the family Autostichidae.

== Species ==
- Symmocoides don (Gozmány, 1963)
- Symmocoides ferreirae Gozmány, 2000
- Symmocoides gozmanyi (Amsel, 1959)
- Symmocoides marthae (Gozmány, 1957)
- Symmocoides margaritis Gozmány, 2008
- Symmocoides oxybiella (Millière, 1872)
