= Symmocoides margaritis =

Scientific classification
- Kingdom: Animalia
- Phylum: Arthropoda
- Clade: Pancrustacea
- Class: Insecta
- Order: Lepidoptera
- Family: Autostichidae
- Genus: Symmocoides
- Species: S. margaritis

Binomial name
- Symmocoides margaritis Gozmány, 2008

Species of moth

Symmocoides margaritis is a moth in the family Autostichidae. It was described by László Anthony Gozmány in 2008. It is found in Morocco.
