= Symmocoides don =

Scientific classification
- Kingdom: Animalia
- Phylum: Arthropoda
- Clade: Pancrustacea
- Class: Insecta
- Order: Lepidoptera
- Family: Autostichidae
- Genus: Symmocoides
- Species: S. don

Binomial name
- Symmocoides don (Gozmány, 1963)

Synonyms
- Donaspastus don Gozmány, 1963

Species of moth

Symmocoides don is a moth of the family Autostichidae. It is found in Spain and Portugal.
