= Amselina monorita =

Scientific classification
- Kingdom: Animalia
- Phylum: Arthropoda
- Clade: Pancrustacea
- Class: Insecta
- Order: Lepidoptera
- Family: Autostichidae
- Genus: Amselina
- Species: A. monorita

Binomial name
- Amselina monorita (Gozmány, 1969)

Synonyms
- Eremicamima monorita Gozmány, 1969

Species of moth

Amselina monorita is a moth in the family Autostichidae. It was described by László Anthony Gozmány in 1969. It is found in Turkey.
