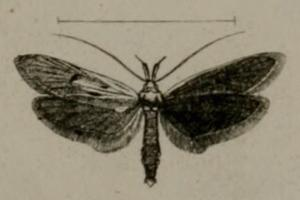
- Apiletria luella

Scientific classification
- Domain: Eukaryota
- Kingdom: Animalia
- Phylum: Arthropoda
- Class: Insecta
- Order: Lepidoptera
- Family: Autostichidae
- Subfamily: Symmocinae
- Genus: Apiletria; Lederer, 1855

Synonyms
- Aretascetis Meyrick, 1936; Xystoceros Meyrick, 1914

= Apiletria =

Genus of moths

Apiletria is a moth genus in the family Autostichidae.

== Species ==
- Apiletria apaurta Gozmány, 1965
- Apiletria asirica Gozmány, 1982
- Apiletria artaxerxes Gozmány, 1965
- Apiletria luella Lederer, 1855
- Apiletria marcida (Felder)
- Apiletria nervosa (Stainton, 1867)
- Apiletria purulentella (Stainton, 1867)
- Apiletria tripleura (Meyrick, 1914)
