= Cornusymmoca =

Scientific classification
- Kingdom: Animalia
- Phylum: Arthropoda
- Clade: Pancrustacea
- Class: Insecta
- Order: Lepidoptera
- Family: Autostichidae
- Subfamily: Symmocinae
- Genus: Cornusymmoca; Gozmány, 1965
- Species: C. mongolica

Binomial name
- Cornusymmoca mongolica Gozmány, 1965

Genus of moths

Cornusymmoca is a moth genus in the family Autostichidae. It contains the species Cornusymmoca mongolica, which is found in Mongolia.
