= Tenieta albidella =

Scientific classification
- Domain: Eukaryota
- Kingdom: Animalia
- Phylum: Arthropoda
- Class: Insecta
- Order: Lepidoptera
- Family: Autostichidae
- Genus: Tenieta
- Species: T. albidella

Binomial name
- Tenieta albidella (Rebel, 1901)

Synonyms
- Epidola albidella Rebel, 1901; Epidola kebillilla Lucas, 1945

Species of moth

Tenieta albidella is a moth in the family Autostichidae. It was described by Hans Rebel in 1901. It is found in Algeria. The original taxonomy classified it as genus Epidola, but it was changed to its current genus Tenieta while keeping the specific name albidella. It is one of two moths currently classified under the genus Tenieta (as of May 2019, according to the Global Lepidoptera Names Index.
