= Orpecovalva =

Scientific classification
- Kingdom: Animalia
- Phylum: Arthropoda
- Clade: Pancrustacea
- Class: Insecta
- Order: Lepidoptera
- Family: Autostichidae
- Subfamily: Symmocinae
- Genus: Orpecovalva; Gozmány, 1964

Genus of moths

Orpecovalva is a Palearctic of moths in the family Autostichidae.

== Species ==
- Orpecovalva acantha (Gozmány, 1963)
- Orpecovalva diadema Gozmány, 1977
- Orpecovalva glaseri Gozmány, 1977
- Orpecovalva kasyi Gozmány, 1988
- Orpecovalva mallorcae Gozmány, 1975
- Orpecovalva obliterata (Walsingham, 1905)
