= Symmacantha =

Scientific classification
- Kingdom: Animalia
- Phylum: Arthropoda
- Clade: Pancrustacea
- Class: Insecta
- Order: Lepidoptera
- Family: Autostichidae
- Subfamily: Symmocinae
- Genus: Symmacantha; Gozmány, 1963
- Species: S. sparsella

Binomial name
- Symmacantha sparsella (de Joannis, 1891)

Synonyms
- Symmoca sparsella de Joannis, 1891

Genus of moths

Symmacantha is a monotypic moth genus in the family Autostichidae described by László Anthony Gozmány in 1963. It contains the species Symmacantha sparsella, described by Joseph de Joannis in 1891, which is found in Palestine, Lebanon and Turkey.
