= Nukusa =

Scientific classification
- Kingdom: Animalia
- Phylum: Arthropoda
- Clade: Pancrustacea
- Class: Insecta
- Order: Lepidoptera
- Family: Autostichidae
- Tribe: Symmocini
- Genus: Nukusa; Gozmány, 1963

Genus of moths

Nukusa is a Palearctic moth genus in the family Autostichidae.

== Species ==
- Nukusa cinerella (Rebel, 1941)
- Nukusa praeditella (Rebel, 1891)
