= Kullashara =

Scientific classification
- Kingdom: Animalia
- Phylum: Arthropoda
- Clade: Pancrustacea
- Class: Insecta
- Order: Lepidoptera
- Family: Autostichidae
- Subfamily: Symmocinae
- Genus: Kullashara; Gozmány, 1963
- Species: K. kalifella

Binomial name
- Kullashara kalifella (Amsel, 1949)

Synonyms
- Symmoca kalifella Amsel, 1949

Genus of moths

Kullashara is a moth genus in the family Autostichidae. It contains the species Kullashara kalifella, which is found in Iran.
