= Orpecovalva obliterata =

Scientific classification
- Kingdom: Animalia
- Phylum: Arthropoda
- Class: Insecta
- Order: Lepidoptera
- Family: Autostichidae
- Genus: Orpecovalva
- Species: O. obliterata

Binomial name
- Orpecovalva obliterata (Walsingham, 1905)

Synonyms
- Symmoca obliterata Walsingham, 1905

Species of moth

Orpecovalva obliterata is a moth in the family Autostichidae. It was described by Walsingham in 1905. It is found in Algeria and Libya.

The wingspan is 11–13 mm. The forewings are hoary greyish white, profusely speckled with greyish fuscous throughout, this is for the most part evenly distributed, but a line along the centre of the wing appears to be somewhat less obscured by the dark speckling, while a reduplicated transverse spot at the end of the cell is slightly indicated, a plical and another discal spot scarcely to be detected, their possible position being shown only by a slight increase of the dark dusting in each place. The hindwings are bronzy grey.
