= Nastoceras colluellum =

Scientific classification
- Kingdom: Animalia
- Phylum: Arthropoda
- Class: Insecta
- Order: Lepidoptera
- Family: Autostichidae
- Genus: Nastoceras
- Species: N. colluellum

Binomial name
- Nastoceras colluellum Chrétien, 1922

Species of moth

Nastoceras colluellum is a moth in the family Autostichidae. It was described by Pierre Chrétien in 1922. It is found in North Africa.
