= Morotripta =

Scientific classification
- Kingdom: Animalia
- Phylum: Arthropoda
- Class: Insecta
- Order: Lepidoptera
- Family: Autostichidae
- Subfamily: Symmocinae
- Genus: Morotripta; Meyrick, 1917

Species
- See text

Genus of moths

Morotripta is a genus of moths of the family Autostichidae. It was formerly placed in the Yponomeutidae.

== Species ==
- Morotripta argillacea Mey, 2011
- Morotripta fatigata Meyrick, 1917
