= Amselina kasyi =

Scientific classification
- Kingdom: Animalia
- Phylum: Arthropoda
- Clade: Pancrustacea
- Class: Insecta
- Order: Lepidoptera
- Family: Autostichidae
- Genus: Amselina
- Species: A. kasyi

Binomial name
- Amselina kasyi (Gozmány, 1961)

Synonyms
- Eremica kasyi Gozmány, 1961

Species of moth

Amselina kasyi is a moth of the family Autostichidae. It is found in North Macedonia and Greece.
