= Pecteneremus decipiens =

Scientific classification
- Kingdom: Animalia
- Phylum: Arthropoda
- Clade: Pancrustacea
- Class: Insecta
- Order: Lepidoptera
- Family: Autostichidae
- Genus: Pecteneremus
- Species: P. decipiens

Binomial name
- Pecteneremus decipiens Gozmány, 1967

Species of moth

Pecteneremus decipiens is a moth in the family Autostichidae. It was described by László Anthony Gozmány in 1967. It is found in Algeria.
