= Amselina minorita =

Scientific classification
- Kingdom: Animalia
- Phylum: Arthropoda
- Clade: Pancrustacea
- Class: Insecta
- Order: Lepidoptera
- Family: Autostichidae
- Genus: Amselina
- Species: A. minorita

Binomial name
- Amselina minorita Gozmány, 1968

Synonyms
- Eremicamima minorita Gozmány, 1969

Species of moth

Amselina minorita is a moth in the family Autostichidae. It was described by László Anthony Gozmány in 1968. It is found in Turkey.
