= Eremica molitor =

Scientific classification
- Domain: Eukaryota
- Kingdom: Animalia
- Phylum: Arthropoda
- Class: Insecta
- Order: Lepidoptera
- Family: Autostichidae
- Genus: Eremica
- Species: E. molitor

Binomial name
- Eremica molitor (Walsingham, 1905)

Synonyms
- Symmoca molitor Walsingham, 1905

Species of moth

Eremica molitor is a moth in the family Autostichidae. It was described by Thomas de Grey, 6th Baron Walsingham, in 1905. It is found in Algeria.

The wingspan is about 15 mm. The forewings are hoary white, profusely sprinkled with black atoms which have a tendency to run in lines, especially along the upper edge of the cell, and from the cell outward to the apex and termen. The hindwings are shining, brownish grey.
