= Serendipitia =

Scientific classification
- Kingdom: Animalia
- Phylum: Arthropoda
- Clade: Pancrustacea
- Class: Insecta
- Order: Lepidoptera
- Family: Autostichidae
- Subfamily: Symmocinae
- Genus: Serendipitia; Gozmány, 2008
- Species: S. sakuntala

Binomial name
- Serendipitia sakuntala Gozmány, 2008

Synonyms
- Serendipitia sacuntala

Genus of moths

Serendipitia is a monotypic moth genus in the family Autostichidae first described by László Anthony Gozmány in 2008. Its single species, Serendipitia sakuntala, described by the same author in the same year, is found in Afghanistan.
