= Aspronympha =

Scientific classification
- Kingdom: Animalia
- Phylum: Arthropoda
- Clade: Pancrustacea
- Class: Insecta
- Order: Lepidoptera
- Family: Autostichidae
- Subfamily: Symmocinae
- Genus: Aspronympha; Gozmány, 2008
- Species: A. agapita

Binomial name
- Aspronympha agapita Gozmány, 2008

Genus of moths

Aspronympha is a monotypic moth genus in the family Autostichidae first described by László Anthony Gozmány in 2008. Its single species, Aspronympha agapita, described by the same author in the same year, is found in Afghanistan.
