= Nukusa praeditella =

Scientific classification
- Domain: Eukaryota
- Kingdom: Animalia
- Phylum: Arthropoda
- Class: Insecta
- Order: Lepidoptera
- Family: Autostichidae
- Genus: Nukusa
- Species: N. praeditella

Binomial name
- Nukusa praeditella (Rebel, 1891)

Synonyms
- Lampros praeditella Rebel, 1891

Species of moth

Nukusa praeditella is a moth of the family Autostichidae. It is found in Albania, Bosnia and Herzegovina, Croatia, Italy and former Serbia and Montenegro.

The wingspan is 10–15 mm. The forewings are shining yellowish grey. The hindwings are shining yellowish ash-grey.
