= Nukusa cinerella =

Scientific classification
- Domain: Eukaryota
- Kingdom: Animalia
- Phylum: Arthropoda
- Class: Insecta
- Order: Lepidoptera
- Family: Autostichidae
- Genus: Nukusa
- Species: N. cinerella

Binomial name
- Nukusa cinerella (Rebel, 1941)

Synonyms
- Borkhausenia cinerella Rebel, 1941

Species of moth

Nukusa cinerella is a moth of the family Autostichidae. It is found in Albania, Croatia, North Macedonia and Greece.
