= Amselina emir =

Scientific classification
- Kingdom: Animalia
- Phylum: Arthropoda
- Clade: Pancrustacea
- Class: Insecta
- Order: Lepidoptera
- Family: Autostichidae
- Genus: Amselina
- Species: A. emir

Binomial name
- Amselina emir (Gozmány, 1961)

Synonyms
- Eremica emir Gozmány, 1961

Species of moth

Amselina emir is a moth of the family Autostichidae which can be found in Greece and Asia Minor.
