= Eremica =

Scientific classification
- Kingdom: Animalia
- Phylum: Arthropoda
- Class: Insecta
- Order: Lepidoptera
- Family: Autostichidae
- Genus: Eremica; Walsingham, 1904

Genus of moths

Eremica is a genus of moth genus belonging to the family Autostichidae. This genus includes species such as Eremica saharae, described by Thomas de Grey, 6th Baron Walsingham, in 1904, and Eremica molitor, described by Walsingham in 1905.

== Species ==
- Eremica saharae Walsingham, 1904
- Eremica molitor (Walsingham, 1905)
