= Tenieta =

Scientific classification
- Kingdom: Animalia
- Phylum: Arthropoda
- Clade: Pancrustacea
- Class: Insecta
- Order: Lepidoptera
- Family: Autostichidae
- Genus: Tenieta; Amsel, 1942

Species
- Tenieta albidella Rebel, 1901; Tenieta evae Gozmany, 1967; Tenieta kebillilla Lucas, 1945

Genus of moths

Tenieta is a moth genus in the family Autostichidae.
