= List of moths of Japan (Gelechioidea) =

Partial list of Japanese moths

This is a list of the Japanese species of the superfamily Gelechioidea. It also acts as an index to the species articles and forms part of the full List of moths of Japan.

== Ethmiidae ==
- チシャノキオオスヒロキバガ — Ethmia assamensis (Butler, 1879)
- アトツマグロオオスヒロキバガ — Ethmia dentata Diakonoff & Sattler, 1966
- キバラハイスヒロキバガ — Ethmia epitrocha (Meyrick, 1914)
- イツボシスヒロキバガ — Ethmia japonica Sattler, 1967
- トホシスヒロキバガ — Ethmia lapidella (Walsingham, 1880)
- クロモンスヒロキバガ — Ethmia maculifera (Matsumura, 1931)
- クロスヒロキバガ — Ethmia nigripedella (Erschoff, 1877)
- ハラボシオオスヒロキバガ — Ethmia nigroapicella (Saalmüller, 1880)
- ナナホシスヒロキバガ — Ethmia septempunctata (Christoph, 1882)

== Depressariidae ==
- ユミモンマルハキバガ — Semioscopis japonicella Saito, 1989
- ナガユミモンマルハキバガ — Semioscopis similis Saito, 1989
- 和名未定 — Agonopterix abjectella Christoph, 1882
- 和名未定 — Agonopterix acuta (Stringer, 1930)
- キガシラヒラタマルハキバガ — Agonopterix angelicella ochrosephara Saito, 1980
- フタテンヒラタマルハキバガ — Agonopterix bipunctifera (Matsumura, 1931)
- サンショウヒラタマルハキバガ — Agonopterix chaetosoma Clarke, 1962
- 和名未定 — Agonopterix conterminella (Zeller, 1839)
- モンシロヒラタマルハキバガ — Agonopterix costaemaculella (Christoph, 1882)
- 和名未定 — Agonopterix deltopa (Meyrick, 1935)
- ヤマウコギヒラタマルハキバガ — Agonopterix encentra (Meyrick, 1914)
- ナガバマルハキバガ — Agonopterix erythrella (Snellen, 1884)
- シャクノマルハキバガ — Agonopterix heracliana (Linnaeus, 1758)
- 和名未定 — Agonopterix hypericella (Hübner, 1776)
- ウラベニヒラタマルハキバガ — Agonopterix intersecta (Filipjev, 1929)
- コクサギヒラタマルハキバガ — Agonopterix issikii Clarke, 1962
- ウスマダラヒラタマルハキバガ — Agonopterix japonica Saito, 1980
- ネジロマルハキバガ — Agonopterix jezonica (Matsumura, 1931)
- チビエルモンマルハキバガ — Agonopterix kaekeritziana (Linnaeus, 1767)
- クロクモマルハキバガ — Agonopterix kisojiana Fujisawa, 1985
- アケボノマルハキバガ — Agonopterix laterella ([Denis & Schiffermüller], 1775)
- クロカギヒラタマルハキバガ — Agonopterix l-nigrum (Matsumura, 1931)
- シロホシマルハキバガ — Agonopterix multiplicella (Erschoff, 1877)
- ヤマボクチマルハキバガ — Agonopterix mutuurai Saito, 1980
- チャボヒラタマルハキバガ — Agonopterix nanatella (Stainton, 1849)
- イハラマルハキバガ — Agonopterix ocellana (Fabricius, 1775)
- ハギノマルハキバガ — Agonopterix omelkoi Lvovsky, 1985
- イヌエンジュヒラタマルハキバガ — Agonopterix pallidior (Stringer, 1930)
- シナノシロホシマルハキバガ — Agonopterix pallorella (Zeller, 1839)
- ムジチャヒラタマルハキバガ — Agonopterix phaeocausta (Meyrick, 1934)
- シノノメマルハキバガ — Agonopterix propinquella (Treitschke, 1835)
- コチャマダラマルハキバガ — Agonopterix rhododrosa (Meyrick, 1934)
- 和名未定 — Agonopterix rimulella Caradja, 1920
- ハナウドヒラタマルハキバガ — Agonopterix sapporensis (Matsumura, 1931)
- アズサアサギマルハキバガ — Agonopterix selini (Heinemann, 1870)
- ヒメネジロマルハキバガ — Agonopterix senecionis (Nickerl, 1864)
- 和名未定 — Agonopterix septicella Snellen, 1884
- スミゾメマルハキバガ — Agonopterix sumizome Fujisawa, 1985
- タカムクマルハキバガ — Agonopterix takamukui (Matsumura, 1931)
- ヤマトマルハキバガ — Agonopterix yamatoensis Fujisawa, 1985
- ヨモギヒラタマルハキバガ — Agonopterix yomogiella Saito, 1980
- ミカンヒラタマルハキバガ — Psorosticha melanocrepida Clarke, 1962
- オオクロミャクマルハキバガ — Depressaria colossella Caradja, 1920
- クロミャクマルハキバガ — Depressaria daucella ([Denis & Schiffermüller], 1775)
- キタグニマルハキバガ — Depressaria filipjevi Lvovsky, 1981
- デコボコマルハキバガ — Depressaria irregularis Matsumura, 1931
- ヨモギセジロマルハキバガ — Depressaria leucocephala Snellen, 1884
- オシラベツマルハキバガ — Depressaria libanotidella Schläger, 1849
- 和名未定 — Depressaria nomia Butler, 1879
- ハナツヅリマルハキバガ — Depressaria pastinacella (Duponchel, 1838)
- モトグロヒラタマルハキバガ — Depressaria petronoma Meyrick, 1934
- チャグロマダラヒラタマルハキバガ — Depressaria spectrocentra Meyrick, 1935
- マエジロマルハキバガ — Depressaria taciturna Meyrick, 1910
- キマダラヒラタマルハキバガ — Eutorna insidiosa Meyrick, 1910
- 和名未定 — Eutorna leonidi Lvovsky, 1979
- シロズヒラタマルハキバガ — Eutorna polismatica Meyrick, 1931

== Elachistidae ==
- ヒョウタンボクモグリガ — Perittia andoi Kuroko, 1982
- スイカズラモグリガ — Perittia lonicerae (Zimmerman & Bradley, 1950)
- チャイロヒラタモグリガモドキ — Perittia ochrella (Sinev, 1992)
- シロオビヒロバクサモグリガ — Perittia unifasciella Sinev, 1992
- 和名未定 — Elachista adscitella Stainton, 1851
- シロクサモグリガ — Elachista albidella (Nylander, 1848)
- アマミノクサモグリガ — Elachista amamii Parenti, 1983
- フタテンシロクサモグリガ — Elachista bipunctella (Sinev & Sruoga, 1995)
- アブラススキノクサモグリガ — Elachista caliginosa Parenti, 1983
- 和名未定 — Elachista canis Parenti, 1983
- 和名未定 — Elachista cingillella (Herrich-Schäffer, 1855)
- マダラクサモグリガ — Elachista coloratella Sinev & Sruoga, 1995
- 和名未定 — Elachista ermolenkoi Sinev & Sruoga, 1995
- 和名未定 — Elachista exactella (Herrich-Schäffer, 1855)
- フタオビススキクサモグリガ — Elachista fasciocaliginosa Sugisima, 2005
- 和名未定 — Elachista fasciola Parenti, 1983
- 和名未定 — Elachista freyerella (Hübner, [1825])
- スゲノクサモグリガ — Elachista fulgens Parenti, 1983
- 和名未定 — Elachista hiranoi Sugisima, 2005
- 和名未定 — Elachista japonica (Parenti, 1983)
- 和名未定 — Elachista jupiter Sugisima, 2005
- コウボウムギクサモグリガ — Elachista kobomugi Sugisima, 1999
- チヂミザサクサモグリガ — Elachista kurokoi Parenti, 1983
- 和名未定 — Elachista latebrella Sinev & Sruoga, 1995
- 和名未定 — Elachista microdigitata Parenti, 1983
- ススキクサモグリガ — Elachista miscanthi Parenti, 1983
- 和名未定 — Elachista multidentella Sinev & Sruoga, 1995
- 和名未定 — Elachista nigriciliae Sugisima, 2005
- ニッポンクサモグリガ — Elachista nipponicella Sugisima, 2006
- 和名未定 — Elachista nitensella Sinev & Sruoga, 1995
- 和名未定 — Elachista nozawana Sugisima, 2005
- 和名未定 — Elachista paragangabella Sugisima, 2005
- クサヨシクサモグリガ — Elachista phalaridis Parenti, 1983
- ヒラズササノクサモグリガ — Elachista planicara Kaila, 1998
- シンセンクサモグリガ — Elachista pusillella (Sinev & Sruoga, 1995)
- ハイイロマダラクサモグリガ — Elachista ribentella Kaila & Varalda, 2004
- ササノクサモグリガ — Elachista sasae Sinev & Sruoga, 1995
- ギンモンクサモグリガ — Elachista similis Sugisima, 2005
- 和名未定 — Elachista simplimorphella Sinev & Sruoga, 1995
- 和名未定 — Elachista subalbidella Schläger, 1847
- ヌカボシソウモグリガ — Elachista tengstromi Kaila, Bengtsson, Sulcs & Junnilainen, 2001
- ヤチチャマダラクサモグリガ — Elachista utonella Frey, 1856

== Parametriotidae ==
- ヒガシノホソエダモグリガ — Haplochrois orientella (Sinev, 1979)
- チャイロエダモグリガ — Blastodacna ochrella Sugisima, 2004

== Deuterogoniidae ==
- アズミマルハキバガ — Deuterogonia azuminensis Fujisawa, 1991
- カタキマルハキバガ — Deuterogonia chionoxantha (Meyrick, 1931)
- カモンジマルハキバガ — Deuterogonia kamonjii Fujisawa, 1991
- アヤメマルハキバガ — Deuterogonia pudorina (Wocke, 1857)

== Xyloryctidae ==
- ツガヒロバキバガ — Metathrinca tsugensis (Kearfott, 1910)
- トガリヒロバキバガ — Pantelamprus staudingeri Christoph, 1882

== Scythrididae ==
- クロキヌバコガ — Scythris palustris (Zeller, 1855)
- キガシラキヌガ — Scythris senescens (Stainton, 1859)
- ヨツモンキヌバコガ — Scythris sinensis (Felder & Rogenhofer, 1875)

== Chimabachidae ==
- メスコバネマルハキバガ — Diurnea cupreifera (Butler, 1879)
- イッシキメスコバネマルハキバガ — Diurnea issikii Saito, 1979
- ミヤマメスコバネマルハキバガ — Cheimophila fumida (Butler, 1879)

== Schistonoeidae ==
- ミツモンホソキバガ — Oecia oecophila (Staudinger, 1876)

== Oecophoridae ==
- クロモンベニマルハキバガ — Schiffermuelleria imogena (Butler, 1879)
- カノコマルハキバガ — Schiffermuelleria zelleri (Christoph, 1882)
- ホソオビキマルハキバガ — Cryptolechia malacobyrsa Meyrick, 1921
- カレハヒメマルハキバガ — Pseudodoxia achlyphanes (Meyrick, 1934)
- スジモンキマルハキバガ — Periacma delegata Meyrick, 1914
- ウスムジヒゲナガマルハキバガ — Carcina homomorpha (Meyrick, 1931)
- ニセコクマルハキバガ — Martyringa ussuriella Lvovsky, 1979
- コクマルハキバガ — Martyringa xeraula (Meyrick, 1910)
- ホソバキホリマルハキバガ — Casmara agronoma Meyrick, 1931
- チャノキホリマルハキバガ — Casmara patrona Meyrick, 1925
- アカガネマルハキバガ — Promalactis akaganea Fujisawa, 2002
- ヒメシロスジカバマルハキバガ — Promalactis autoclina Meyrick, 1935
- シロスジベニマルハキバガ — Promalactis enopisema (Butler, 1879)
- フジサワベニマルハキバガ — Promalactis ermolenkoi Lvovsky, 1986
- ギンモンカバマルハキバガ — Promalactis jezonica (Matsumura, 1931)
- ホングウギンモンマルハキバガ — Promalactis kumanoensis Fujisawa, 2002
- マノベニマルハキバガ — Promalactis manoi Fujisawa, 2002
- ヨスジカバマルハキバガ — Promalactis matsuurae Fujisawa, 2002
- サカイマルハキバガ — Promalactis sakaiella (Matsumura, 1931)
- シロスジカバマルハキバガ — Promalactis suzukiella (Matsumura, 1931)
- ツマジロベニマルハキバガ — Promalactis venustella (Christoph, 1882)
- ヤエヤマカバマルハキバガ — Promalactis yaeyamaensis Fujisawa, 2002
- カレハチビマルハキバガ — Tyrolimnas anthraconesa Meyrick, 1934
- キガシラマルハキバガ — Pedioxestis isomorpha Meyrick, 1932
- ナニワズハリキバガ — Anchinia cristalis (Scopoli, 1763)
- クロマイコモドキ — Lamprystica igneola Stringer, 1930
- アイカップマルハキバガ — Pseudatemelia josephinae (Toll, 1956)
- 和名未定 — Telechrysis tripuncta (Haworth, 1828)

== Stathmopodidae ==
- キイロマイコガ — Stathmopoda auriferella (Walker, 1864)
- フタオビクロマイコガ — Stathmopoda brachymochla Meyrick, 1937
- ハンノマイコガ — Stathmopoda flavescens Kuznetzov, 1984
- カタアカマイコガ — Stathmopoda haematosema Meyrick, 1933
- カキノヘタムシガ — Stathmopoda masinissa Meyrick, 1906
- モトキマイコガ — Stathmopoda moriutiella Kasy, 1973
- オビマイコガ — Stathmopoda opticaspis Meyrick, 1931
- キイロオビマイコガ — Stathmopoda pedella (Linnaeus, 1761)
- オオマイコガ — Stathmopoda stimulata Meyrick, 1913
- シロテンクロマイコガ — Atrijuglans hetaohei Yang, 1977
- クロコマイコガ — Hieromantis kurokoi Yasuda, 1988
- 和名未定 — Hieromantis makiosana Yasuda, 1988
- セグロベニトゲアシガ — Atkinsonia ignipicta (Butler, 1881)
- アカヒゲベニトゲアシガ — Atkinsonia leechi (Walsingham, 1889)
- 和名未定 — Snellenia iginispergens Diakonoff, 1948
- 和名未定 — Minomona bimaculata Matsumura, 1931

== Lecithoceridae ==
- フタクロボシキバガ — Scythropiodes issikii (Takahashi, 1930)
- ゴマフシロキバガ — Scythropiodes leucostola (Meyrick, 1921)
- ムモンヒロバキバガ — Scythropiodes lividula (Meyrick, 1932)
- フタテンヒロバキバガ — Scythropiodes malivora (Meyrick, 1930)
- 和名未定 — Scythropiodes notocapna (Meyrick, 1925)
- シロヒロバキバガ — Scythropiodes venusta (Moriuti, 1977)
- マエチャオオヒロバキバガ — Rhizosthenes falciformis Meyrick, 1935
- 和名未定 — Homaloxestis hesperis Gozmány, 1978
- キベリハイヒゲナガキバガ — Homaloxestis myeloxesta Meyrick, 1932
- カクバネヒゲナガキバガ — Lecitholaxa thiodora (Meyrick, 1914)
- 和名未定 — Lecithocera chersitis Meyrick, 1918
- 和名未定 — Lecithocera daebuensis Park, 1999
- ムモンクロヒゲナガキバガ — Catacreagra notolychna (Meyrick, 1936)
- イッシキヒゲナガキバガ — Issikiopteryx japonica Moriuti, 1973
- オビカクバネヒゲナガキバガ — Deltoplastis apostatis (Meyrick, 1932)
- クロカクバネヒゲナガキバガ — Athymoris martialis Meyrick, 1935
- コゲチャヒゲナガキバガ — Halolaguna sublaxata Gozmány, 1978

== Batrachedridae ==
- コウスチャホソキバガ — Batrachedra albicapitella Sinev, 1986
- ヤシノホソキバガ — Batrachedra arenosella (Walker, 1864)
- ウスチャホソキバガ — Batrachedra koreana Sinev & Park, 1994
- ウスジロホソキバガ — Batrachedra pinicolella (Zeller, 1839)
- ヤブミョウガスゴモリキバガ — Idioglossa polliacola Sugisima, 2000
- 和名未定 — Epimarptis hiranoi Sugisima, 2004

== Coleophoridae ==
- ヨモギケブカツツミノガ — Coleophora albicans Zeller, 1849
- ヤナギピストルミノガ — Coleophora albidella ([Denis & Schiffermüller], 1775)
- キンバネツツミノガ — Coleophora alcyonipennella (Kollar, 1832)
- ヨモギハナツツミノガ — Coleophora artemisicolella Bruand, 1854
- リンゴピストルミノガ — Coleophora bernoulliella (Goeze, 1783)
- アザミオオツツミノガ — Coleophora brevipalpella Wocke, 1874
- 和名未定 — Coleophora burhinella Baldizzone & Oku, 1990
- カツラツツミノガ — Coleophora cercidiphyllella Oku, 1965
- アカザハナツツミノガ — Coleophora chenopodii Oku, 1965
- ヨモギムモンツツミノガ — Coleophora cinclella Baldizzone & Oku, 1990
- ヒメツツミノガ — Coleophora citrarga Meyrick, 1934
- アカミャクツツミノガ — Coleophora cristata Baldizzone, 1989
- 和名未定 — Coleophora currucipennella Zeller, 1839
- ヤチツツミノガ — Coleophora elodella Baldizzone & Oku, 1988
- ヨモギホソツツミノガ — Coleophora enkomiella Baldizzone & Oku, 1988
- フタイロツツミノガ — Coleophora eteropennella Baldizzone & Oku, 1988
- 和名未定 — Coleophora falkovitshella Vives Moreno, 1984
- キミャクツツミノガ — Coleophora flavovena Matsumura, 1931
- ハンノキツツミノガ — Coleophora hancola Oku, 1965
- ヨモギオオツツミノガ — Coleophora honshuella Baldizzone & Oku, 1988
- ノコンギクハナツツミノガ — Coleophora hsiaolingensis Toll, 1942
- ウスシロミャクツツミノガ — Coleophora issikii Baldizzone & Oku, 1988
- ニレナガツツミノガ — Coleophora japonicella Oku, 1965
- コウガイゼキショウツツミノガ — Coleophora juncivora Baldizzone & Oku, 1990
- ユウガギクハナツツミノガ — Coleophora kamtschatica (Anikin, 1998)
- ゴマフツツミノガ — Coleophora kudrosella Baldizzone & Oku, 1988
- キクツツミノガ — Coleophora kurokoi Oku, 1974
- 和名未定 — Coleophora laniella Baldizzone & Oku, 1990
- 和名未定 — Coleophora laricella (Hübner, [1817])
- イソツツジツツミノガ — Coleophora ledi Stainton, 1860
- ナラツツミノガ — Coleophora levantis Baldizzone & Oku, 1988
- シラヤマギクツツミノガ — Coleophora linosyridella Fuchs, 1880
- ヒメキンバネツツミノガ — Coleophora mayrella (Hübner, [1813])
- カシワピストルミノガ — Coleophora melanographa Meyrick, 1935
- カンバマエジロツツミノガ — Coleophora milvipennis Zeller, 1839
- ノギククロツツミノガ — Coleophora molothrella Baldizzone & Oku, 1988
- コケモモツツミノガ — Coleophora murinella Tengström, 1847
- サクラツツミノガ — Coleophora neviusiella Busck, 1904
- カラマツツツミノガ — Coleophora obducta (Meyrick, 1931)
- 和名未定 — Coleophora okuella Baldizzone & Savenkov, 2002
- シラカバピストルミノガ — Coleophora platyphyllae Oku, 1965
- ノギクギンオビツツミノガ — Coleophora pseudoditella Baldizzone & Patzak, 1983
- ミヤマピストルミノガ — Coleophora quercicola Baldizzone & Oku, 1990
- アカザフシガ — Coleophora serinipennella Christoph, 1872
- シラカバツツミノガ — Coleophora serratella (Linnaeus, 1761)
- リンゴツツミノガ — Coleophora spinella (Schrank, 1802)
- アカザウスグロツツミノガ — Coleophora sternipennella (Zetterstedt, 1839)
- シロミャクツツミノガ — Coleophora therinella Tengström, 1848
- 和名未定 — Coleophora trifolii (Curtis, 1832)
- ニレコツツミノガ — Coleophora ulmivorella Oku, 1965
- アズキナシツツミノガ — Coleophora uniformis Oku, 1965
- アオビユツツミノガ — Coleophora versurella Zeller, 1849
- シモフリツツミノガ — Coleophora vestianella (Linnaeus, 1758)
- アキノキリンソウツツミノガ — Coleophora virgaureae Stainton, 1857
- ヨモギツツミノガ — Coleophora yomogiella Oku, 1974

== Momphidae ==
- ハイイロアカバナキバガ — Mompha glaucella Sinev, 1986
- エゾフジアカバナキバガ — Cyphophora minorella Sinev, 1993
- アカガネアカバナキバガ — Psacaphora locupletella ([Denis & Schiffermüller], 1775)
- クロガネアカバナキバガ — Psacaphora ludwigiae (Bradley, 1973)

== Blastobasidae ==
- シロジネマルハキバガ — Hypatopa montivaga Moriuti, 1982
- イノウエネマルハキバガ — Blastobasis inouei Moriuti, 1987
- コネマルハキバガ — Blastobasis sprotundalis Park, 1984
- オオネマルハキバガ — Neoblastobasis biceratala (Park, 1984)
- 和名未定 — Neoblastobasis brevicornis Moriuti, 1987
- ウスオビネマルハキバガ — Neoblastobasis decolor (Meyrick, 1907)
- ウスイロネマルハキバガ — Neoblastobasis spiniharpella Kuznetzov & Sinev, 1985
- 和名未定 — Holcocera sakura Ohshima, 2003

== Autostichidae ==
- 和名未定 — Autosticha imitativa Ueda, 1997
- ヒマラヤスギキバガ — Autosticha kyotensis (Matsumura, 1931)
- ミツボシキバガ — Autosticha modicella (Christoph, 1882)
- クロボシキバガ — Autosticha pachysticta (Meyrick, 1936)
- ヨツモンキバガ — Autosticha tetragonopa (Meyrick, 1935)
- 和名未定 — Autosticha truncicola Ueda, 1997

== Peleopodidae ==
- ネズミエグリヒラタマルハキバガ — Acria ceramitis Meyrick, 1908
- オオエグリヒラタマルハキバガ — Acria emarginella (Donovan, 1806)

== Cosmopterigidae ==
- ヒメクロボシトガリホソガ — Syntomaula cana Moriuti, 1977
- オオクロボシトガリホソガ — Syntomaula simulatella (Walker, 1864)
- アシブサトガリホソガ — Ashibusa jezoensis Matsumura, 1931
- ホソカザリバ — Cosmopterix attenuatella (Walker, 1864)
- カザリバ — Cosmopterix fulminella Stringer, 1930
- 和名未定 — Cosmopterix gracilis Sinev, 1985
- ナガカザリバ — Cosmopterix infundibulella Sinev
- 和名未定 — Cosmopterix kurilensis Sinev, 1985
- オオウスオビカザリバ — Cosmopterix laetificoides Sinev, 1993
- ヨシウスオビカザリバ — Cosmopterix lienigiella Lienig & Zeller, 1846
- ドルリーカザリバ — Cosmopterix orichalcea Stainton, 1861
- マダケカザリバ — Cosmopterix phyllostachysea Kuroko, 1975
- コカザリバ — Cosmopterix rhyncognathosella Sinev, 1985
- サッポロカザリバ — Cosmopterix sapporensis (Matsumura, 1931)
- マメカザリバ — Cosmopterix schmidiella Frey, 1856
- ヨシカザリバ — Cosmopterix scribaiella japonica Kuroko, 1960
- ヒメカザリバ — Cosmopterix setariella Sinev, 1985
- ススキキオビカザリバ — Cosmopterix sublaetifica Kuroko, 1982
- ウスイロカザリバ — Cosmopterix victor Stringer, 1930
- カラムシカザリバ — Cosmopterix zieglerella (Hübner, [1810])
- フサヒゲトガリホソガ — Labdia antennella Sinev & Park, 1994
- オオツマキトガリホソガ — Labdia bicolorella (Snellen, 1884)
- ツマキトガリホソガ — Labdia citracma (Meyrick, 1915)
- セジロトガリホソガ — Labdia issikii Kuroko, 1982
- ギンスジトガリホソガ — Labdia niphosticta (Meyrick, 1936)
- ベニモントガリホソガ — Labdia semicoccinea (Stainton, 1859)
- 和名未定 — Labdia stagmatophorella Sinev, 1993
- クロギンスジトガリホソガ — Ressia quercidentella Sinev, 1991
- タテスジトガリホソガ — Pyroderces sarcogypsa (Meyrick, 1932)
- 和名未定 — Anatrachyntis incertulella (Walker, 1864)
- マダラトガリホソガ — Anatrachyntis japonica Kuroko, 1982
- トウモロコシトガリホソガ — Anatrachyntis rileyi (Walsingham, 1882)
- ガマトガリホソガ — Limnaecia phragmitella Stainton, 1851
- タコノキトガリホソガ — Trissodoris honorariella (Walsingham, 1907)
- キオビキバガ — Macrobathra quercea Moriuti, 1973
- ベニモンマイコモドキ — Pancalia hexachrysa (Meyrick, 1935)
- ギンモンマイコモドキ — Pancalia isshikii Matsumura, 1931

== Gelechiidae ==
- グミハモグリキバガ — Apatetris elaeagnella Sakamaki, 2000
- ハマニンニクキバガ — Apatetris elymicola Sakamaki, 2000
- ソバカスキバガ — Gelechia acanthopis Meyrick, 1932
- ナラクロテンキバガ — Gelechia anomorcta Meyrick, 1926
- ゴマダラハイキバガ — Gelechia cuneatella Douglas, 1852
- 和名未定 — Gelechia fuscooculata Omelko
- ヤナギウスグロキバガ — Gelechia inconspicua Omelko, 1986
- 和名未定 — Gelechia tragicella (Heyden, 1865)
- ミツコブキバガ — Psoricoptera gibbosella (Zeller, 1839)
- 和名未定 — Psoricoptera kawabei Park & Karsholt, 1999
- クルミミツコブキバガ — Psoricoptera latignathosa Park & Karsholt, 1999
- 和名未定 — Psoricoptera speciosella Teich, 1983
- 和名未定 — Psoricoptera triorthias (Meyrick, 1935)
- ミヤマシモフリキバガ — Chionodes continuella (Zeller, 1839)
- ミヤマシロオビキバガ — Chionodes viduella (Fabricius, 1794)
- ミヤマオオクロキバガ — Neofaculta taigana Ponomarenko, 1988
- シロクロキバガ — Recurvaria comprobata (Meyrick, 1935)
- ナラクロオビキバガ — Nuntia incognitella (Caradja, 1920)
- イブキチビキバガ — Stenolechia bathrodyas Meyrick, 1935
- アカマツチビキバガ — Stenolechia kodamai Okada, 1962
- ゴマダラシロチビキバガ — Stenolechia notomochla Meyrick, 1935
- シロホソハネキバガ — Stenolechia rectivalva Kanazawa, 1984
- ツシマチビキバガ — Stenolechia robusta Kanazawa, 1984
- ウロコホソハネキバガ — Stenolechia squamifera Kanazawa, 1984
- マツノクロボシキバガ — Exoteleia dodecella (Linnaeus, 1758)
- 和名未定 — Parastenolechia gracilis Kanazawa, 1991
- イッシキチビキバガ — Parastenolechia issikiella (Okada, 1961)
- 和名未定 — Angustialata gemmellaformis Omelko, 1988
- 和名未定 — Piskunovia reductionis Omelko, 1986
- 和名未定 — Protoparachronistis concolor Omelko, 1999
- 和名未定 — Protoparachronistis discedens Omelko, 1986
- 和名未定 — Protoparachronistis policapitis Omelko, 1986
- 和名未定 — Parachronistis fumea Omelko
- 和名未定 — Parachronistis incerta Omelko
- カクモンハイイロヒメキバガ — Parachronistis jiriensis Park, 1985
- ゴマダラヒメキバガ — Parachronistis maritima Omelko, 1986
- ハイイロゴマダラヒメキバガ — Chorivalva bisaccula Omelko, 1988
- ウスグロゴマダラヒメキバガ — Chorivalva usisaccula Omelko, 1988
- キンバネチビキバガ — Sinevia temulenta Omelko, 1998
- ジャガイモキバガ — Phthorimaea operculella (Zeller, 1873)
- クロマダラコキバガ — Caryocolum junctellum (Douglas, 1851)
- ユウヤミキバガ — Caryocolum pullatellum (Tengström, 1848)
- ウスグロコキバガ — Euscrobipalpa artemisiella (Treitschke, 1833)
- ハマアカザキバガ — Euscrobipalpa atriplicella (Fischer von Röslerstamm, 1841)
- 和名未定 — Euscrobipalpa caryocoloides (Povolný, 1977)
- マダラコキバガ — Euscrobipalpa japonica (Povolný, 1977)
- 和名未定 — Euscrobipalpa kurokoi (Povolný, 1977)
- 和名未定 — Euscrobipalpa synurella (Povolný, 1977)
- ヒヨドリジョウゴキバガ — Ergasiola ergasima (Meyrick, 1916)
- ゴマシオコキバガ — Scrobipalpula japonica Povolný, 2000
- ゴマダラウスチャキバガ — Teleiodes bradleyi Park, 1992
- ワタナベクロオビキバガ — Teleiodes linearivalvata (Moriuti, 1977)
- キボシキバガ — Teleiodes orientalis Park, 1992
- ヤチヤナギキバガ — Teleiodes paripunctella (Thunberg, 1794)
- ニセナラクロオビキバガ — Teleiodes pekunensis Park, 1993
- 和名未定 — Teleiodes vulgella ([Denis & Schiffermüller], 1775)
- ネジロナカグロキバガ — Carpatolechia daehania (Park, 1993)
- ウスクロオビキバガ — Carpatolechia digitilobella (Park, 1992)
- ニセキボシクロキバガ — Carpatolechia flavipunctatella (Park, 1992)
- クロホシハイキバガ — Carpatolechia proximella (Hübner, 1796)
- ナラウスオビキバガ — Carpatolechia quercicola (Park, 1992)
- キボシクロキバガ — Carpatolechia yangyangensis (Park, 1992)
- ゴマフキイロキバガ — Pseudotelphusa acrobrunella Park, 1992
- ウスクロテンシロキバガ — Pseudotelphusa alburnella (Zeller, 1839)
- ズマダラハイキバガ — Pseudotelphusa fugitivella (Zeller, 1839)
- クロオビハイキバガ — Telphusa nephomicta Meyrick, 1932
- イシガケモンハイイロキバガ — Altenia inscriptella (Christoph, 1882)
- ダイセツキバガ — Altenia perspersella (Wocke, 1862)
- オオトガリキバガ — Metzneria inflammatella (Christoph, 1882)
- ゴボウトガリキバガ — Metzneria lappella (Linnaeus, 1758)
- ギンボシアカガネキバガ — Argolamprotes micella ([Denis & Schiffermüller], 1775)
- ウスキマダラキバガ — Monochroa cleodora (Meyrick, 1935)
- ヒメキマダラキバガ — Monochroa cleodoroides Sakamaki, 1994
- サクラソウキバガ — Monochroa conspersella (Herrich-Schäffer, 1854)
- アヤメキバガ — Monochroa divisella (Douglas, 1850)
- ホーニッヒチャマダラキバガ — Monochroa hornigi (Staudinger, 1883)
- ミゾソバキバガ — Monochroa japonica Sakamaki, 1996
- クマタシラホシキバガ — Monochroa kumatai Sakamaki, 1996
- ウスイロフサベリキバガ — Monochroa leptocrossa (Meyrick, 1926)
- キモンキバガ — Monochroa lucidella (Stephens, 1834)
- マエチャキバガ — Monochroa pallida Sakamaki, 1996
- イツボシマダラキバガ — Monochroa pentameris (Meyrick, 1931)
- ニセイグサキバガ — Monochroa subcostipunctella Sakamaki, 1996
- イグサキバガ — Monochroa suffusella (Douglas, 1850)
- エゾキバガ — Apodia bifractella (Duponchel, [1843])
- 和名未定 — Daltopora sinanensis Sakamaki, 1995
- ヘルマンアカザキバガ — Chrysoesthia drurella (Fabricius, 1775)
- イノコズチキバガ — Chrysoesthia heringi (Kuroko, 1961)
- ムツモンアカザキバガ — Chrysoesthia sexguttella (Thunberg, 1794)
- キモンアカガネキバガ — Eulamprotes atrella ([Denis & Schiffermüller], 1775)
- 和名未定 — Eulamprotes wilkella (Linnaeus, 1758)
- バクガ — Sitotroga cerealella (Olivier, 1789)
- サクラキバガ — Anacampsis anisogramma (Meyrick, 1927)
- ツツジキバガ — Anacampsis lignaria (Meyrick, 1926)
- ミズナラキバガ — Anacampsis mongolicae Park, 1988
- コナラキバガ — Anacampsis okui Park, 1988
- ポプラキバガ — Anacampsis populella (Clerck, 1759)
- シロオビクロキバガ — Anacampsis solemnella (Christoph, 1882)
- カンバシモフリキバガ — Anacampsis triangulella Park, 1988
- クロチビキバガ — Aproaerema anthyllidella (Hübner, [1813])
- マエジロキバガ — Sophronia chilonella (Treitschke, 1833)
- チャマダラキバガ — Bryotropha mundella (Douglas, 1850)
- ニセチャマダラキバガ — Bryotropha similis (Stainton, 1854)
- ハイマダラキバガ — Bryotropha svenssoni Park, 1984
- シロテンクロキバガ — Aroga gozmanyi Park, 1991
- シロモンクロキバガ — Aroga mesostrepta (Meyrick, 1932)
- ツマキキバガ — Aulidiotis bicolor Moriuti, 1977
- ミドリチビキバガ — Aristotelia citrocosma Meyrick, 1906
- 和名未定 — Aristotelia incitata Meyrick, 1918
- 和名未定 — Stegasta abdita Park & Omelko, 1994
- チェジュキバガ — Stegasta jejuensis Park & Omelko, 1994
- ハギノシロオビキバガ — Evippe albidorsella (Snellen, 1884)
- セジロチビキバガ — Evippe syrictis (Meyrick, 1936)
- カドホシキバガ — Photodotis adornata Omelko
- クロカドホシキバガ — Photodotis palens Omelko
- ツマスジキバガ — Thiotricha attenuata Omelko, 1993
- カギツマウススジキバガ — Thiotricha celata Omelko, 1993
- カギツマフトオビキバガ — Thiotricha corylella Omelko, 1993
- カギツマクロキバガ — Thiotricha fusca Omelko, 1993
- カギツマウスチャキバガ — Thiotricha indistincta Omelko, 1993
- カギツマシマキバガ — Thiotricha obliquata (Matsumura, 1931)
- ヤマモモキバガ — Thiotricha pancratiastis Meyrick, 1921
- スジウスキキバガ — Thiotricha pontifera Meyrick, 1932
- クロバイキバガ — Thiotricha prunifolivora Ueda & Fujiwara, 2005
- ウステンキバガ — Thiotricha subocellea (Stephens, 1834)
- カギツマスジキバガ — Thiotricha synodonta Meyrick, 1936
- クルミシントメキバガ — Thiotricha trapezoidella (Caradja, 1920)
- 和名未定 — Thiotricha tylephora Meyrick, 1935
- モンギンホソキバガ — Thyrsostoma pylartis (Meyrick, 1908)
- ギンチビキバガ — Cnaphostola angustella Omelko, 1984
- フタイロギンチビキバガ — Cnaphostola biformis Omelko, 1984
- ツマモンギンチビキバガ — Cnaphostola venustalis Omelko, 1984
- ウスツヤキバガ — Xystophora psammitella (Snellen, 1884)
- ヘリグロウスキキバガ — Brachmia dimidiella ([Denis & Schiffermüller], 1775)
- ウスヅマスジキバガ — Cymotricha japonicella (Zeller, 1877)
- タテジマキバガ — Helcystogramma arotraeum (Meyrick, 1894)
- 和名未定 — Helcystogramma claripunctellum Ponomarenko, 1998
- ヘリグロタテジマキバガ — Helcystogramma fuscomarginatum Ueda, 1995
- 和名未定 — Helcystogramma perelegans (Omelko & Omelko, 1999)
- イモキバガ — Helcystogramma triannulellum (Herrich-Schäffer, 1854)
- コフサキバガ — Dichomeris acuminata (Staudinger, 1876)
- ウスイロフサキバガ — Dichomeris anisacuminata Li & Zheng, 1996
- オオフサキバガ — Dichomeris atomogypsa (Meyrick, 1932)
- コクロフサキバガ — Dichomeris beljaevi (Ponomarenko, 1998)
- コゲチャオオフサキバガ — Dichomeris chinganella (Christoph, 1882)
- クルミオオフサキバガ — Dichomeris christophi Ponomarenko & Mey, 2002
- コカバフサキバガ — Dichomeris consertella (Christoph, 1882)
- ヒメフサキバガ — Dichomeris ferruginosa Meyrick, 1913
- モンフサキバガ — Dichomeris harmonias Meyrick, 1922
- カバイロキバガ — Dichomeris heriguronis (Matsumura, 1931)
- オドリキバガ — Dichomeris hoplocrates (Meyrick, 1932)
- セグロフサキバガ — Dichomeris horoglypta Meyrick, 1932
- イッシキオオフサキバガ — Dichomeris issikii (Okada, 1961)
- 和名未定 — Dichomeris junisonis Matsumura, 1931
- ハギフサキバガ — Dichomeris lespedezae Park, 1994
- ミニフサキバガ — Dichomeris minutia Park, 1994
- 和名未定 — Dichomeris mitteri Park, 1994
- フジフサキバガ — Dichomeris oceanis Meyrick, 1920
- ビワフサキバガ — Dichomeris ochthophora Meyrick, 1936
- キイロオオフサキバガ — Dichomeris okadai (Moriuti, 1982)
- ウスボシフサキバガ — Dichomeris praevacua Meyrick, 1922
- ウスグロキバガ — Dichomeris rasilella (Herrich-Schäffer, 1854)
- ウスアミメフサキバガ — Dichomeris sparsella (Christoph, 1882)
- 和名未定 — Dichomeris syndyas Meyrick, 1926
- ムモンフサキバガ — Dichomeris tostella Stringer, 1930
- カバオオフサキバガ — Dichomeris ustalella (Fabricius, 1794)
- クロヘリキバガ — Mesophleps albilinella (Park, 1990)
- Mesophleps bifidella H.H. Li & Sattler, 2012
- ヘリクロモンキイロキバガ — Athrips nigricostella (Duponchel, 1842)
- ホシウンモンキバガ — Athrips polymaculella Park, 1991
- シロノコメキバガ — Hypatima excellentella Ponomarenko, 1991
- マエモンノコメキバガ — Hypatima rhomboidella (Linnaeus, 1758)
- ウスアトベリキバガ — Hypatima spathota (Meyrick, 1913)
- マエウスノコメキバガ — Hypatima venefica Ponomarenko, 1991
- チャモンシロキバガ — Ethmiopsis catarina (Ponomarenko, 1994)
- ニセクロクモシロキバガ — Ethmiopsis subtegulifera (Ponomarenko, 1994)
- クロクモシロキバガ — Ethmiopsis tegulifera (Meyrick, 1932)
- カラコギカエデキバガ — Faristenia acerella Ponomarenko, 1993
- ウスチャバネノコメキバガ — Faristenia atrimaculata Park, 1993
- ハイイロマダラノコメキバガ — Faristenia furtumella Ponomarenko, 1991
- クロモンノコメキバガ — Faristenia geminisignella Ponomarenko, 1991
- カワリノコメキバガ — Faristenia jumbongae Park, 1993
- ニセクロモンノコメキバガ — Faristenia kanazawai Ueda & Ponomarenko, 2000
- ムクロジハオリノコメキバガ — Faristenia mukurossivora Ueda & Ponomarenko, 2000
- オメルコクロノコメキバガ — Faristenia omelkoi Ponomarenko, 1991
- ゴマダラノコメキバガ — Faristenia quercivora Ponomarenko, 1991
- ウスリーノコメキバガ — Faristenia ussuriella Ponomarenko, 1991
- ホシウスジロキバガ — Dendrophilia albidella (Snellen, 1884)
- マメキバガ — Dendrophilia leguminella Ponomarenko, 1993
- ナカオビキバガ — Dendrophilia mediofasciana (Park, 1991)
- ツチイロキバガ — Dendrophilia neotaphronoma Ponomarenko, 1993
- ハイイロチビキバガ — Dendrophilia petrinopis (Meyrick, 1935)
- 和名未定 — Dendrophilia saxigera (Meyrick, 1931)
- ハイジロオオキバガ — Tornodoxa tholochorda Meyrick, 1921
- フタモンキバガ — Anarsia bimaculata Ponomarenko, 1989
- フタクロモンキバガ — Anarsia bipinnata (Meyrick, 1932)
- コマエモンハイキバガ — Anarsia incerta Ueda, 1997
- ヒメマエモンハイキバガ — Anarsia isogona Meyrick, 1913
- マエモンハイキバガ — Anarsia protensa Park, 1995
- モンハイジロキバガ — Anarsia silvosa Ueda, 1997
- チャイロスジキバガ — Anarsia tortuosa (Meyrick, 1913)
- ワモンキバガ — Bagdadia claviformis (Park, 1993)
- 和名未定 — Bagdadia gnomia (Ponomarenko, 1995)
- ムクロジキバガ — Bagdadia sapindivora (Clarke, 1958)
- ワタアカミムシガ — Pectinophora gossypiella (Saunders, 1844)
- オキナワセンダンキバガ — Paralida okinawensis Ueda, 2005
- センダンキバガ — Paralida triannulata Clarke, 1958
- ズグロキバガ — Holcophoroides nigriceps Matsumura, 1931
