= Sasae =

Sasae may refer to:

== People ==
- Kenichirō Sasae (佐々江 賢一郎; born 1951), Japanese politician

== Others ==
- Sasae tsurikomi ashi, a judo throw commonly referred to simply as "sasae"
- Elachista sasae, is a moth in the family Elachistidae
- Streptomyces sasae, is a Gram-positive bacterium species
