= Eupithecia stigmaticata =

Scientific classification
- Kingdom: Animalia
- Phylum: Arthropoda
- Clade: Pancrustacea
- Class: Insecta
- Order: Lepidoptera
- Family: Geometridae
- Genus: Eupithecia
- Species: E. stigmaticata

Binomial name
- Eupithecia stigmaticata Christoph, 1885

Synonyms
- Eupithecia stigmatica

Species of moth

Eupithecia stigmaticata is a moth in the family Geometridae. It is found in Turkmenistan.
