= Elachista ribentella =

Scientific classification
- Kingdom: Animalia
- Phylum: Arthropoda
- Clade: Pancrustacea
- Class: Insecta
- Order: Lepidoptera
- Family: Elachistidae
- Genus: Elachista
- Species: E. ribentella

Binomial name
- Elachista ribentella Kaila & Varalda, 2004

Species of moth

Elachista ribentella is a moth of the family Elachistidae. It is found in Japan and the Russian Far East.

The length of the forewings is 2.7–3.5 mm (0.11–0.14 in) for males and 3.5–3.7 mm (0.14–0.15 in) for females. The larvae feed on Carex blepharicarpa. They mine the leaves of their host plant.
