= Agonopterix abjectella =

Scientific classification
- Kingdom: Animalia
- Phylum: Arthropoda
- Clade: Pancrustacea
- Class: Insecta
- Order: Lepidoptera
- Family: Depressariidae
- Genus: Agonopterix
- Species: A. abjectella

Binomial name
- Agonopterix abjectella (Christoph, 1882)

Synonyms
- Depressaria abjectella Christoph, 1882

Species of moth

Agonopterix abjectella is a moth in the family Depressariidae. It was described by Hugo Theodor Christoph in 1882. It is found in south-eastern Siberia and on the Kuriles.
