= Ethmia assamensis =

Scientific classification
- Domain: Eukaryota
- Kingdom: Animalia
- Phylum: Arthropoda
- Class: Insecta
- Order: Lepidoptera
- Family: Depressariidae
- Genus: Ethmia
- Species: E. assamensis

Binomial name
- Ethmia assamensis (Butler, 1879)

Synonyms
- Hyponomeuta assamensis Butler, 1879; Psecadia hockingella Walsingham, 1880

Species of moth

Ethmia assamensis is a moth in the family Depressariidae. It is found in India, China, Pakistan, Sri Lanka, Bhutan and Nepal. Records for Taiwan are based on misidentifications of Ethmia okinawana.

The wingspan is 20–23 mm (0.79–0.91 in). The forewings are grey with black lines. The hindwings are grey with yellow hair at the base.

The larvae feed on Ehretia ovalifolia, Ehretia serrata and Meliosma myriantha.
