= Agonopterix costaemaculella =

Scientific classification
- Kingdom: Animalia
- Phylum: Arthropoda
- Clade: Pancrustacea
- Class: Insecta
- Order: Lepidoptera
- Family: Depressariidae
- Genus: Agonopterix
- Species: A. costaemaculella

Binomial name
- Agonopterix costaemaculella (Christoph, 1882)

Synonyms
- Depressaria costaemaculella Christoph, 1882; Cryptolechia costimaculella Meyrick, 1922

Species of moth

Agonopterix costaemaculella is a moth in the family Depressariidae. It was described by Hugo Theodor Christoph in 1882. It is found in the Russian Far East (Amur and Primorye regions and the Kuriles), Japan and the Himalayas.
