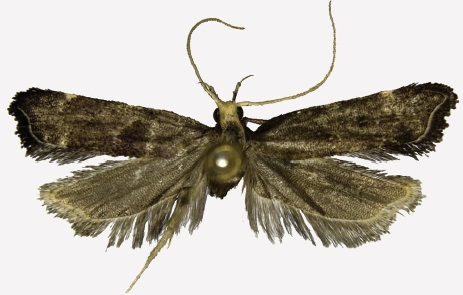

Scientific classification
- Domain: Eukaryota
- Kingdom: Animalia
- Phylum: Arthropoda
- Class: Insecta
- Order: Lepidoptera
- Family: Lecithoceridae
- Genus: Halolaguna
- Species: H. oncopteryx

Binomial name
- Halolaguna oncopteryx (Wu, 1994)

Synonyms
- Cynicostola oncopteryx Wu, 1994

= Halolaguna oncopteryx =

Species of moth

Halolaguna oncopteryx is a moth in the family Lecithoceridae. It is found in the provinces of Chongqing, Fujian, Guangxi, Sichuan, Yunnan and Zhejiang in China. and Taiwan.

The wingspan is 15–16 mm.
