= Halolaguna sanmaru =

Scientific classification
- Domain: Eukaryota
- Kingdom: Animalia
- Phylum: Arthropoda
- Class: Insecta
- Order: Lepidoptera
- Family: Lecithoceridae
- Genus: Halolaguna
- Species: H. sanmaru

Binomial name
- Halolaguna sanmaru Park, 2011

Species of moth

Halolaguna sanmaru is a moth in the family Lecithoceridae. It is found in Thailand.
