= Halolaguna biferrinella =

Scientific classification
- Kingdom: Animalia
- Phylum: Arthropoda
- Class: Insecta
- Order: Lepidoptera
- Family: Lecithoceridae
- Genus: Halolaguna
- Species: H. biferrinella

Binomial name
- Halolaguna biferrinella (Walker, 1864)

Synonyms
- Lecithocera biferrinella Walker, 1864

Species of moth

Halolaguna biferrinella is a moth in the family Lecithoceridae. It is found in Malaysia and Indonesia.

Adults are chalybeous, the wings moderately broad. The forewings are rounded at the tips, with a ferruginous transverse interior line and a broad ferruginous band, which is narrower hindward and extends nearly to the border, and includes a longitudinal subcostal chalybeous streak. These two hues are divided from each other by black lines. The hindwings are aeneous.
