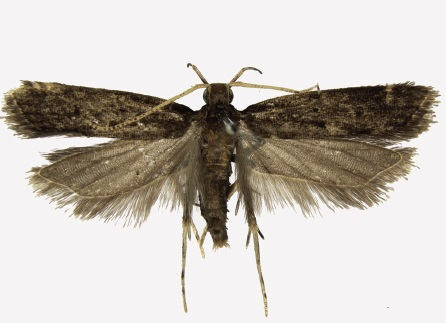

Scientific classification
- Domain: Eukaryota
- Kingdom: Animalia
- Phylum: Arthropoda
- Class: Insecta
- Order: Lepidoptera
- Family: Lecithoceridae
- Genus: Halolaguna
- Species: H. guizhouensis

Binomial name
- Halolaguna guizhouensis Wu, 2012

= Halolaguna guizhouensis =

Species of moth

Halolaguna guizhouensis is a moth in the family Lecithoceridae. It is found in China (Chongqing, Guangdong, Guangxi, Guizhou).

The wingspan is 14–15 mm.
