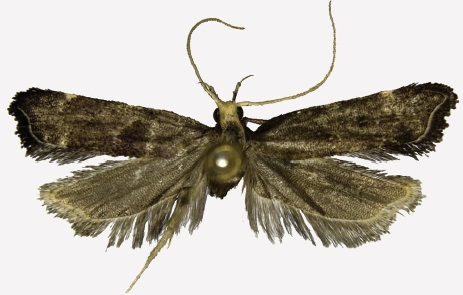
- Halolaguna oncopteryx

Scientific classification
- Kingdom: Animalia
- Phylum: Arthropoda
- Clade: Pancrustacea
- Class: Insecta
- Order: Lepidoptera
- Family: Lecithoceridae
- Subfamily: Torodorinae
- Genus: Halolaguna; Gozmány, 1978

= Halolaguna =

Genus of moths

Halolaguna is a genus of moth in the family Lecithoceridae.

== Species ==
- Halolaguna biferrinella (Walker, 1864)
- Halolaguna discoidea Teng, Liu & Wang, 2014
- Halolaguna flabellata Teng, Liu & Wang, 2014
- Halolaguna guizhouensis Wu, 2012
- Halolaguna oncopteryx (Wu, 1994)
- Halolaguna orthogonia Wu, 2000
- Halolaguna palinensis Park, 2000
- Halolaguna sanmaru Park, 2011
- Halolaguna sublaxata Gozmány, 1978
