= Elachista jupiter =

Scientific classification
- Domain: Eukaryota
- Kingdom: Animalia
- Phylum: Arthropoda
- Class: Insecta
- Order: Lepidoptera
- Family: Elachistidae
- Genus: Elachista
- Species: E. jupiter

Binomial name
- Elachista jupiter Sugisima, 2005

Species of moth

Elachista jupiter is a moth in the family Elachistidae. It was described by Sugisima in 2005. It is found in Japan (Hokkaidô).

The length of the forewings is 3.3–3.9 mm for males and 3.3–3.5 mm for females. Adults are very similar to Elachista hiranoi, but can be distinguished by differences in coloration of the forewings. Adults have been recorded on wing from late May to early June, probably in one generation per year.
