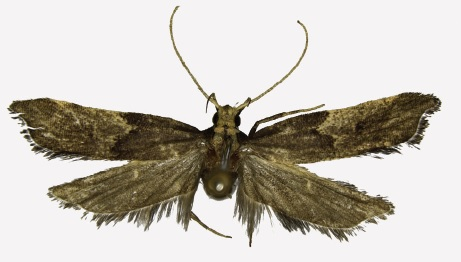

Scientific classification
- Domain: Eukaryota
- Kingdom: Animalia
- Phylum: Arthropoda
- Class: Insecta
- Order: Lepidoptera
- Family: Lecithoceridae
- Genus: Halolaguna
- Species: H. discoidea

Binomial name
- Halolaguna discoidea Teng, Liu & Wang, 2014

= Halolaguna discoidea =

Species of moth

Halolaguna discoidea is a moth in the family Lecithoceridae. It is found in China (Chongqing, Guangxi, Sichuan).

The wingspan is 16.5–18 mm. The ground colour of the forewings is deep greyish brown with a yellowish white subapical spot. The discal and discocellular spots are blackish brown and there is a yellowish white line extending from the costal 2/5 to above the fold, edged with blackish brown scales along the inner margin. The hindwings are greyish brown, but yellowish white basally.

== Etymology ==
The species name refers to the discal process of the aedeagus at the apex and is derived from Latin discoideus (meaning discal).
