= Protoparachronistis initialis =

Scientific classification
- Kingdom: Animalia
- Phylum: Arthropoda
- Clade: Pancrustacea
- Class: Insecta
- Order: Lepidoptera
- Family: Gelechiidae
- Genus: Protoparachronistis
- Species: P. initialis

Binomial name
- Protoparachronistis initialis Omelko, 1986

Species of moth

Protoparachronistis initialis is a moth in the family Gelechiidae. It was described by Omelko in 1986. It is found in Russia.
