= Dichomeris sparsellus =

Scientific classification
- Domain: Eukaryota
- Kingdom: Animalia
- Phylum: Arthropoda
- Class: Insecta
- Order: Lepidoptera
- Family: Gelechiidae
- Genus: Dichomeris
- Species: D. sparsellus

Binomial name
- Dichomeris sparsellus (Christoph, 1882)

Synonyms
- Ypsolophus sparsellus Christoph, 1882; Dichomeris sparsella

Species of moth

Dichomeris sparsellus is a moth in the family Gelechiidae. It was described by Hugo Theodor Christoph in 1882. It is found in south-eastern Siberia, China (Heilongjiang), Korea and Japan.

The length of the forewings is 10–11 mm.

The larvae feed on Pterocarya rhoifolia, Juglans ailanthifolia, Juglans mandschurica and Juglans regia.
