= Pantelamprus =

Scientific classification
- Kingdom: Animalia
- Phylum: Arthropoda
- Class: Insecta
- Order: Lepidoptera
- Family: Xyloryctidae
- Genus: Pantelamprus; Christoph, 1882

Moth genus in family Xyloryctidae

Pantelamprus is a genus of moths of the family Xyloryctidae.

== Species ==
- Pantelamprus fimbripedana (Walker, 1863)
- Pantelamprus staudingeri Christoph, 1882
