= Dichomeris hoplocrates =

Scientific classification
- Kingdom: Animalia
- Phylum: Arthropoda
- Class: Insecta
- Order: Lepidoptera
- Family: Gelechiidae
- Genus: Dichomeris
- Species: D. hoplocrates

Binomial name
- Dichomeris hoplocrates (Meyrick, 1932)

Synonyms
- Tricyanaula hoplocrates Meyrick, 1932

Species of moth

Dichomeris hoplocrates is a moth in the family Gelechiidae. It was described by Edward Meyrick in 1932. It is found on the Japanese islands of Hokkaido, Honshu, Shikoku and Kyushu.

The length of the forewings is 6.2–7.5 mm (0.24–0.30 in).

The larvae feed on Duchesnea chrysantha, Rubus sieboldii and Rubus buergeri.
