= Pantelamprus fimbripedana =

Scientific classification
- Kingdom: Animalia
- Phylum: Arthropoda
- Class: Insecta
- Order: Lepidoptera
- Family: Xyloryctidae
- Genus: Pantelamprus
- Species: P. fimbripedana

Binomial name
- Pantelamprus fimbripedana (Walker, 1863)

Synonyms
- Tortrix fimbripedana Walker, 1863

Species of moth

Pantelamprus fimbripedana is a moth in the family Xyloryctidae. It was described by Francis Walker in 1863. It is found on Borneo.

Adults are a pale fawn colour, squamous (scaly), silky. The forewings are rounded at the tips, with a broad white streak which extends along more than half of the middle length of the costa and is convex towards the disc. There are a few black and brown speckles and a broad brown streak which extends from near the tip of the white mark to the interior angle. The costa is convex towards the base and the exterior border is slightly convex and oblique.
