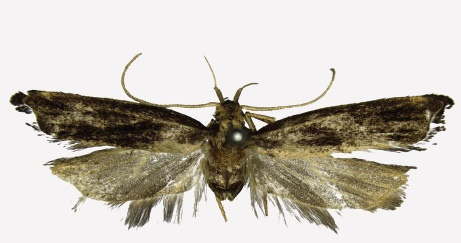

Scientific classification
- Domain: Eukaryota
- Kingdom: Animalia
- Phylum: Arthropoda
- Class: Insecta
- Order: Lepidoptera
- Family: Lecithoceridae
- Genus: Halolaguna
- Species: H. flabellata

Binomial name
- Halolaguna flabellata Teng, Liu & Wang, 2014

= Halolaguna flabellata =

Species of moth

Halolaguna flabellata is a moth in the family Lecithoceridae. It is found in Guangxi, China.

The wingspan is 16–16.5 mm. The ground colour of the forewings is dark brown with a pale yellow subapical spot. The discal and discocellular spots are blackish brown. The hindwings are grey, but yellowish white basally.

== Etymology ==
The species name refers to the basally fan-shaped uncus and is derived from Latin flabellatus (meaning fan shaped).
