= Anacampsis solemnella =

Scientific classification
- Kingdom: Animalia
- Phylum: Arthropoda
- Clade: Pancrustacea
- Class: Insecta
- Order: Lepidoptera
- Family: Gelechiidae
- Genus: Anacampsis
- Species: A. solemnella

Binomial name
- Anacampsis solemnella (Christoph, 1882)

Synonyms
- Tachyptilia solemnella Christoph, 1882; Compsolechia metagramma Meyrick, 1918

Species of moth

Anacampsis solemnella is a moth of the family Gelechiidae. It was described by Hugo Theodor Christoph in 1882. It is found in Japan and the Russian Far East.

The wingspan is about 15 mm. The forewings are dark fuscous, speckled grey whitish. The stigmata are obscurely blackish, the plical rather obliquely before the first discal. There is a slightly incurved white line from four-fifths of the costa to the dorsum before the tornus, thickened towards the costa, preceded by a band of blackish suffusion. The hindwings are dark grey.

The larvae feed on Prunus salicina.
