= Protoparachronistis =

Scientific classification
- Kingdom: Animalia
- Phylum: Arthropoda
- Class: Insecta
- Order: Lepidoptera
- Family: Gelechiidae
- Subfamily: Gelechiinae
- Genus: Protoparachronistis; Omelko, 1986

Synonyms
- Furcatisacculus Omelko, 1986

Genus of moths

Protoparachronistis is a genus of moth in the family Gelechiidae.

== Species ==
- Protoparachronistis concolor Omelko, 1986
- Protoparachronistis discedens Omelko, 1986
- Protoparachronistis initialis Omelko, 1986
- Protoparachronistis policapitis Omelko, 1993
