= Daltopora =

Scientific classification
- Kingdom: Animalia
- Phylum: Arthropoda
- Clade: Pancrustacea
- Class: Insecta
- Order: Lepidoptera
- Family: Gelechiidae
- Genus: Daltopora; Povolný, 1979

Genus of moths

Daltopora is a genus of moths in the family Gelechiidae.

== Species ==
- Daltopora felixi Povolný, 1979
- Daltopora sinanensis Sakamaki, 1995
