= Halolaguna palinensis =

Scientific classification
- Kingdom: Animalia
- Phylum: Arthropoda
- Class: Insecta
- Order: Lepidoptera
- Family: Lecithoceridae
- Genus: Halolaguna
- Species: H. palinensis

Binomial name
- Halolaguna palinensis Park, 2000

Species of moth

Halolaguna palinensis is a moth in the family Lecithoceridae. It is endemic to Taiwan.

The wingspan is about 15 mm.

== Etymology ==
The species name refers to the collecting locality.
