= Ethmia septempunctata =

Scientific classification
- Domain: Eukaryota
- Kingdom: Animalia
- Phylum: Arthropoda
- Class: Insecta
- Order: Lepidoptera
- Family: Depressariidae
- Genus: Ethmia
- Species: E. septempunctata

Binomial name
- Ethmia septempunctata (Christoph, 1882)

Synonyms
- Psecadia septempunctata Christoph, 1882

Species of moth

Ethmia septempunctata is a moth in the family Depressariidae. It is found in Japan, Korea, the Russian Far East and China.

The wingspan is 15–18 mm (0.59–0.71 in). Adults have been recorded from May to mid-July.
