= Autosticha modicella =

Scientific classification
- Kingdom: Animalia
- Phylum: Arthropoda
- Clade: Pancrustacea
- Class: Insecta
- Order: Lepidoptera
- Family: Autostichidae
- Genus: Autosticha
- Species: A. modicella

Binomial name
- Autosticha modicella (Christoph, 1882)

Synonyms
- Ceratophora modicella Christoph, 1882; Brachmia modicella

Species of moth

Autosticha modicella is a moth in the family Autostichidae. It was described by Hugo Theodor Christoph in 1882. It is found in the Russian Far East (Ussuri), Korea, Japan (Hokkaido, Honshu, Shikoku, Kyushu), Taiwan and China (Heilongjiang, Jilin, Henan, Zhejiang, Jiangxi, Hunan, Sichuan).
