= Dichomeris chinganella =

Scientific classification
- Domain: Eukaryota
- Kingdom: Animalia
- Phylum: Arthropoda
- Class: Insecta
- Order: Lepidoptera
- Family: Gelechiidae
- Genus: Dichomeris
- Species: D. chinganella

Binomial name
- Dichomeris chinganella (Christoph, 1882)

Synonyms
- Nothris chinganella Christoph, 1882

Species of moth

Dichomeris chinganella is a moth in the family Gelechiidae. It was described by Hugo Theodor Christoph in 1882. It is found in south-eastern Siberia, Japan and Turkey.

The length of the forewings is 9–10 mm. The forewings are reddish grey with whitish, yellowish or dark brownish strigulation and four blackish-brown spots. The hindwings are light brownish grey.
