= Halolaguna orthogonia =

Scientific classification
- Domain: Eukaryota
- Kingdom: Animalia
- Phylum: Arthropoda
- Class: Insecta
- Order: Lepidoptera
- Family: Lecithoceridae
- Genus: Halolaguna
- Species: H. orthogonia

Binomial name
- Halolaguna orthogonia Wu, 2000

Species of moth

Halolaguna discoidea is a moth in the family Lecithoceridae. It is found on Borneo.
