= Daltopora felixi =

Scientific classification
- Kingdom: Animalia
- Phylum: Arthropoda
- Clade: Pancrustacea
- Class: Insecta
- Order: Lepidoptera
- Family: Gelechiidae
- Genus: Daltopora
- Species: D. felixi

Binomial name
- Daltopora felixi Povolný, 1979

Species of moth

Daltopora felixi is a moth of the family Gelechiidae. It was described by Povolný in 1979. It is found in Mongolia.

The length of the forewings is 5.3-6.2 mm for males and about 4 mm for females.
