= Pantelamprus staudingeri =

Scientific classification
- Kingdom: Animalia
- Phylum: Arthropoda
- Class: Insecta
- Order: Lepidoptera
- Family: Xyloryctidae
- Genus: Pantelamprus
- Species: P. staudingeri

Binomial name
- Pantelamprus staudingeri Christoph, 1882

Species of moth

Pantelamprus staudingeri is a moth in the family Xyloryctidae. It was described by Hugo Theodor Christoph in 1882. It is found in south-eastern Siberia and Japan.
