= Dichomeris ochthophora =

Scientific classification
- Kingdom: Animalia
- Phylum: Arthropoda
- Class: Insecta
- Order: Lepidoptera
- Family: Gelechiidae
- Genus: Dichomeris
- Species: D. ochthophora

Binomial name
- Dichomeris ochthophora Meyrick, 1936

Species of moth

Dichomeris ochthophora is a moth in the family Gelechiidae. It was described by Edward Meyrick in 1936. It is found in China (Hong Kong, Gansu, Jiangxi, Yunnan), Taiwan and Japan.

The wingspan is 13.5-14.5 mm.

The larvae feed on Eriobotrya japonica, Rhaphiolepis umbellata and Photinia lucida.
