= Ethmia maculifera =

Scientific classification
- Kingdom: Animalia
- Phylum: Arthropoda
- Clade: Pancrustacea
- Class: Insecta
- Order: Lepidoptera
- Family: Depressariidae
- Genus: Ethmia
- Species: E. maculifera

Binomial name
- Ethmia maculifera (Matsumura, 1931)

Synonyms
- Symmoca maculifera Matsumura, 1931; Ethmia mesozyga Meyrick, 1935

Species of moth

Ethmia maculifera is a moth in the family Depressariidae. It is found in Japan and Taiwan.

The wingspan is 20–22 mm (0.79–0.87 in). The forewings are overlaid with black markings on a whitish grey background. The hindwings are grey without costal brushes.

The larvae feed on Ehretia dicksonii.
