= Coleophora uniformis =

Scientific classification
- Kingdom: Animalia
- Phylum: Arthropoda
- Class: Insecta
- Order: Lepidoptera
- Family: Coleophoridae
- Genus: Coleophora
- Species: C. uniformis

Binomial name
- Coleophora uniformis Oku, 1965

Species of moth

Coleophora uniformis is a moth of the family Coleophoridae. It is found in Japan.

The wingspan is 9–10 mm.
