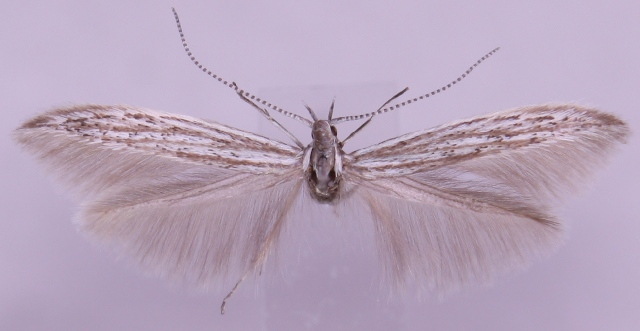

Scientific classification
- Kingdom: Animalia
- Phylum: Arthropoda
- Class: Insecta
- Order: Lepidoptera
- Family: Coleophoridae
- Genus: Coleophora
- Species: C. albicans

Binomial name
- Coleophora albicans Zeller, 1849

Synonyms
- Coleophora artemisiella Scott, 1861; Coleophora simillimella Fuchs, 1881

= Coleophora albicans =

Species of moth

Coleophora albicans is a moth of the family Coleophoridae. It is found from Fennoscandia to the Iberian Peninsula, Italy and Bulgaria and from Great Britain to southern Russia and further east to Japan. It is also known from China.

The wingspan is 11–14 mm.

The larvae feed on Artemisia absinthium, Artemisia campestris and Artemisia maritima.
