= Elachista nitensella =

Scientific classification
- Kingdom: Animalia
- Phylum: Arthropoda
- Clade: Pancrustacea
- Class: Insecta
- Order: Lepidoptera
- Family: Elachistidae
- Genus: Elachista
- Species: E. nitensella

Binomial name
- Elachista nitensella Sinev & Sruoga, 1995

Species of moth

Elachista nitensella is a moth in the family Elachistidae. It was described by Sinev and Sruoga in 1995. It is found in Japan (Hokkaido, Honshu, Kyushu) and the Russian Far East (Primorsky Krai).

== Description ==
The length of the forewings is 2.9–3.7 mm for males and 3.6–3.7 mm for females.

== Nutrition ==
The larvae feed on Carex species, possibly including Carex microtricha. They probably feed on the roots of their host plant.
