= Coleophora quercicola =

Scientific classification
- Kingdom: Animalia
- Phylum: Arthropoda
- Clade: Pancrustacea
- Class: Insecta
- Order: Lepidoptera
- Family: Coleophoridae
- Genus: Coleophora
- Species: C. quercicola

Binomial name
- Coleophora quercicola Baldizzone & Oku, 1990

Synonyms
- Coleophora querciola

Species of moth

Coleophora quercicola is a moth of the family Coleophoridae. It is found in Japan (Honshu), South Korea, and southeastern Siberia.

The wingspan is 11–16.5 mm (0.43–0.65 in).

The larvae feed on the leaves of Quercus mongolica.
