= Dichomeris syndyas =

Scientific classification
- Kingdom: Animalia
- Phylum: Arthropoda
- Class: Insecta
- Order: Lepidoptera
- Family: Gelechiidae
- Genus: Dichomeris
- Species: D. syndyas

Binomial name
- Dichomeris syndyas Meyrick, 1926

Synonyms
- Dichomeris aomoriensis Park & Hodges, 1995

Species of moth

Dichomeris syndyas is a moth in the family Gelechiidae. It was described by Edward Meyrick in 1926. It is found in Asia, from Asia Minor to Russian Far East and Taiwan.

The wingspan is 20–21 mm. The forewings are light grey partially or wholly suffused with white and slightly sprinkled with dark fuscous. The costa is more or less strongly and suffusedly mottled with dark fuscous, and there is sometimes grey strigulation towards the dorsum and termen. There is an irregular dark fuscous spot on the fold about one-fourth and a dark grey transverse blotch in disc at one-third. The first discal stigma is represented by two approximated obliquely placed dark fuscous dots, the second by a transverse mark. There is also a marginal series of small dark fuscous dots around the apex and termen. The hindwings are light grey.
