= Coleophora honshuella =

Scientific classification
- Kingdom: Animalia
- Phylum: Arthropoda
- Clade: Pancrustacea
- Class: Insecta
- Order: Lepidoptera
- Family: Coleophoridae
- Genus: Coleophora
- Species: C. honshuella

Binomial name
- Coleophora honshuella Baldizzone & Oku, 1988

Species of moth

Coleophora honshuella is a moth of the family Coleophoridae. It is found on Honshu island in Japan, Korea, and southeastern Siberia.

The wingspan is 15–19 mm (0.59–0.75 in). Adults are on wing from late July to early August. The larvae feed on the leaves of Artemisia princeps.
