= Coleophora okuella =

Scientific classification
- Kingdom: Animalia
- Phylum: Arthropoda
- Clade: Pancrustacea
- Class: Insecta
- Order: Lepidoptera
- Family: Coleophoridae
- Genus: Coleophora
- Species: C. okuella

Binomial name
- Coleophora okuella Baldizzone & Savenkov, 2002

Species of moth

Coleophora okuella is a moth of the family Coleophoridae. It is found in Russian Far East and in Japan.

The wingspan is about 9–10 mm (0.35–0.39 in).
