= Coleophora elodella =

Scientific classification
- Kingdom: Animalia
- Phylum: Arthropoda
- Clade: Pancrustacea
- Class: Insecta
- Order: Lepidoptera
- Family: Coleophoridae
- Genus: Coleophora
- Species: C. elodella

Binomial name
- Coleophora elodella Baldizzone & Oku, 1988

Species of moth

Coleophora elodella is a moth of the family Coleophoridae. It is found in the islands of Hokkaido and Honshu in Japan.

The wingspan is 9.5–10.5 mm (0.37–0.41 in). Adults are on wing from June to September.

The larvae possibly feed on Juncus.
