= Coleophora kudrosella =

Scientific classification
- Kingdom: Animalia
- Phylum: Arthropoda
- Clade: Pancrustacea
- Class: Insecta
- Order: Lepidoptera
- Family: Coleophoridae
- Genus: Coleophora
- Species: C. kudrosella

Binomial name
- Coleophora kudrosella Baldizzone & Oku, 1988

Species of moth

Coleophora kudrosella is a moth of the family Coleophoridae. It is found on Honshu island of Japan.

The moth's wingspan is 9.5–10 mm (0.37–0.39 in).
