= Dichomeris mitteri =

Scientific classification
- Kingdom: Animalia
- Phylum: Arthropoda
- Clade: Pancrustacea
- Class: Insecta
- Order: Lepidoptera
- Family: Gelechiidae
- Genus: Dichomeris
- Species: D. mitteri

Binomial name
- Dichomeris mitteri Park, 1994

Species of moth

Dichomeris mitteri is a moth in the family Gelechiidae. It was described by Kyu-Tek Park in 1994. It is found in China (Shaanxi), Korea and Japan (Honshu, Kyushu).

The length of the forewings is 6.5-6.7 mm.
