= Coleophora platyphyllae =

Scientific classification
- Kingdom: Animalia
- Phylum: Arthropoda
- Class: Insecta
- Order: Lepidoptera
- Family: Coleophoridae
- Genus: Coleophora
- Species: C. platyphyllae

Binomial name
- Coleophora platyphyllae Oku, 1965

Species of moth

Coleophora platyphyllae is a moth of the family Coleophoridae. It is found in Japan.

The wingspan is about 13 mm.
