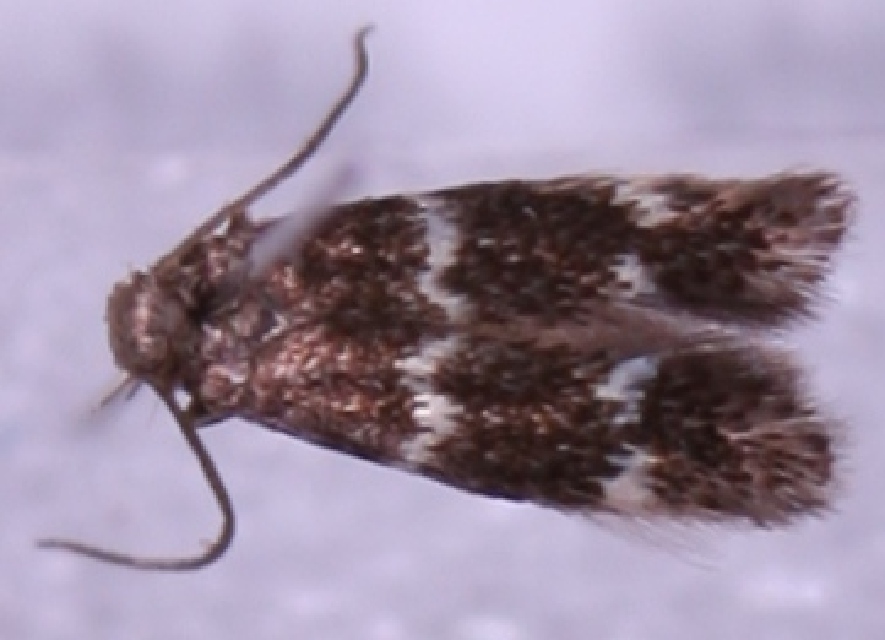

Scientific classification
- Kingdom: Animalia
- Phylum: Arthropoda
- Clade: Pancrustacea
- Class: Insecta
- Order: Lepidoptera
- Family: Elachistidae
- Genus: Elachista
- Species: E. pusillella

Binomial name
- Elachista pusillella (Sinev & Sruoga, 1995)

Synonyms
- Biselachista pusillella Sinev & Sruoga, 1995

= Elachista pusillella =

Species of moth

Elachista pusillella is a moth in the family Elachistidae. It was described by Sinev and Sruoga in 1995. It is found in south-eastern Siberia and Japan.

The larvae feed on Carex pauciflora. They mine the leaves of their host plant. The mine has the form of a linear full-depth mine.
