= Cosmopterix sapporensis =

Scientific classification
- Kingdom: Animalia
- Phylum: Arthropoda
- Clade: Pancrustacea
- Class: Insecta
- Order: Lepidoptera
- Family: Cosmopterigidae
- Genus: Cosmopterix
- Species: C. sapporensis

Binomial name
- Cosmopterix sapporensis Matsumura, 1931

Species of moth

Cosmopterix sapporensis is a moth in the family Cosmopterigidae. It is found in Japan and Russia.

The wingspan is 12–14 mm.
