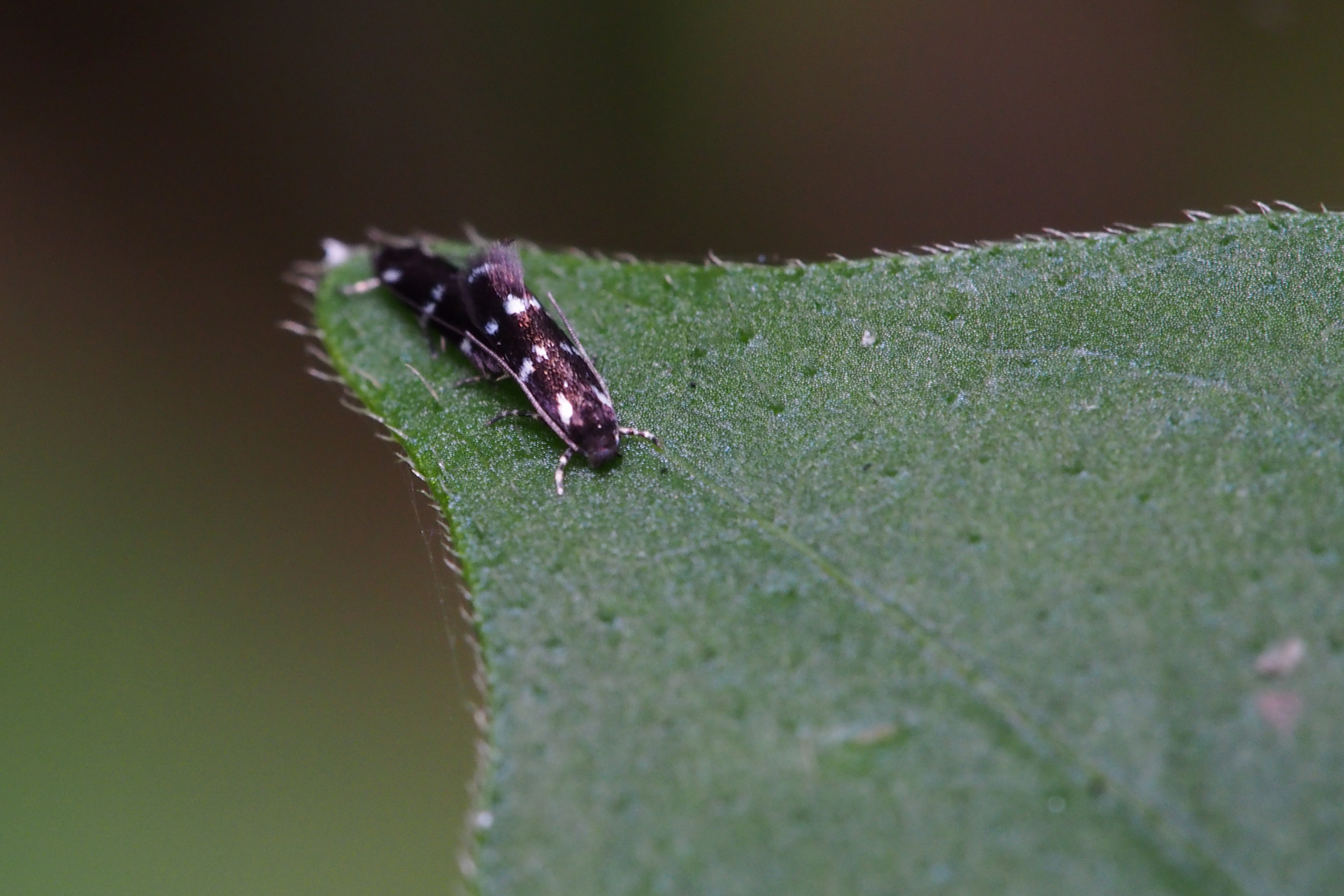

Scientific classification
- Domain: Eukaryota
- Kingdom: Animalia
- Phylum: Arthropoda
- Class: Insecta
- Order: Lepidoptera
- Family: Elachistidae
- Genus: Elachista
- Species: E. kurokoi

Binomial name
- Elachista kurokoi Parenti, 1983

= Elachista kurokoi =

Species of moth

Elachista kurokoi is a moth in the family Elachistidae. It was described by Parenti in 1983. It is found in Japan (Honsyû, Sikoku, Kyûsyû, Tusima, Ryûkyû).
