= Elachista caliginosa =

Scientific classification
- Domain: Eukaryota
- Kingdom: Animalia
- Phylum: Arthropoda
- Class: Insecta
- Order: Lepidoptera
- Family: Elachistidae
- Genus: Elachista
- Species: E. caliginosa

Binomial name
- Elachista caliginosa Parenti, 1983

Species of moth

Elachista caliginosa is a moth in the family Elachistidae. It was described by Parenti in 1983. It is found in Japan (Honshu) and the Russian Far East (Primorsky Kray).

The length of the forewings is 2.5–3 mm for males and 2.7-3.2 mm for females

The larvae feed on Eccoilopus cotulifer and possibly Spodiopogon sibiricus. They mine the leaves of their host plant.
