= Elachista amamii =

Scientific classification
- Domain: Eukaryota
- Kingdom: Animalia
- Phylum: Arthropoda
- Class: Insecta
- Order: Lepidoptera
- Family: Elachistidae
- Genus: Elachista
- Species: E. amamii

Binomial name
- Elachista amamii Parenti, 1983

Synonyms
- Elachista amamaii

Species of moth

Elachista amamii is a moth of the family Elachistidae. It is found in the Ryukyu Islands of Japan and in Taiwan.

The length of the forewings is 2.4–3 mm for males and 2.5–3 mm for females.

The larvae feed on Thuerea involuta, Digitaria timorensis and Digitaria adscendens. They mine the leaves of their host plant.
