= Coleophora cinclella =

Scientific classification
- Kingdom: Animalia
- Phylum: Arthropoda
- Clade: Pancrustacea
- Class: Insecta
- Order: Lepidoptera
- Family: Coleophoridae
- Genus: Coleophora
- Species: C. cinclella

Binomial name
- Coleophora cinclella Baldizzone & Oku, 1990

Species of moth

Coleophora cinclella is a moth of the family Coleophoridae. It is found on Honshu island of Japan.

The wingspan is about 13 mm.
