= Coleophora issikii =

Scientific classification
- Kingdom: Animalia
- Phylum: Arthropoda
- Clade: Pancrustacea
- Class: Insecta
- Order: Lepidoptera
- Family: Coleophoridae
- Genus: Coleophora
- Species: C. issikii

Binomial name
- Coleophora issikii Baldizzone & Oku, 1988

Species of moth

Coleophora issikii is a moth of the family Coleophoridae. It is found in Honshu island of Japan.

The wingspan is 13–16 mm (0.51–0.63 in). Adults are on wing from August to mid-September.
