= Coleophora melanograpta =

Scientific classification
- Kingdom: Animalia
- Phylum: Arthropoda
- Class: Insecta
- Order: Lepidoptera
- Family: Coleophoridae
- Genus: Coleophora
- Species: C. melanograpta

Binomial name
- Coleophora melanograpta Meyrick, 1935

Species of moth

Coleophora melanograpta is a moth of the family Coleophoridae. It is found in Japan (the islands of Hokkaido and Honshu), China, Korea, and southeastern Siberia.

The wingspan is 11–13 mm (0.43–0.51 in). Adults are on wing in July.

The larvae feed on the leaves of Quercus mongolica, Quercus serrata, Quercus dentata, and Quercus acutissima.
