= Cosmopterix victor =

Scientific classification
- Kingdom: Animalia
- Phylum: Arthropoda
- Class: Insecta
- Order: Lepidoptera
- Family: Cosmopterigidae
- Genus: Cosmopterix
- Species: C. victor

Binomial name
- Cosmopterix victor Stringer, 1930

Species of moth

Cosmopterix victor is a moth in the family Cosmopterigidae. It is found in Japan.
