= Elachista colouratella =

Scientific classification
- Kingdom: Animalia
- Phylum: Arthropoda
- Clade: Pancrustacea
- Class: Insecta
- Order: Lepidoptera
- Family: Elachistidae
- Genus: Elachista
- Species: E. colouratella

Binomial name
- Elachista colouratella Sinev & Sruoga, 1995

Synonyms
- Elachista coloratella

Species of moth

Elachista colouratella is a moth in the family Elachistidae. It was described by Sinev and Sruoga in 1995. It is found in Japan and the Russian Far East.

The larvae feed on Carex insaniae. They mine the leaves of their host plant. The mine has the form of a full-depth linear blotch.
