= Lecithocera daebuensis =

Scientific classification
- Kingdom: Animalia
- Phylum: Arthropoda
- Clade: Pancrustacea
- Class: Insecta
- Order: Lepidoptera
- Family: Lecithoceridae
- Genus: Lecithocera
- Species: L. daebuensis

Binomial name
- Lecithocera daebuensis Park, 1999

Species of moth in genus Lecithocera

Lecithocera daebuensis is a moth in the family Lecithoceridae. It was described by Kyu-Tek Park in 1999. It is found in Korea.

The wingspan is 13.5–15 mm.
