= Coleophora kurokoi =

Scientific classification
- Kingdom: Animalia
- Phylum: Arthropoda
- Clade: Pancrustacea
- Class: Insecta
- Order: Lepidoptera
- Family: Coleophoridae
- Genus: Coleophora
- Species: C. kurokoi

Binomial name
- Coleophora kurokoi Oku, 1974

Species of moth

Coleophora kurokoi is a moth of the family Coleophoridae. It is found in Japan and China (Yunnan, Zhejiang). It is named for Hiroshi Kuroko.

The wingspan is 9–11 mm (0.35–0.43 in). The larvae feed on the leaves of Artemisia princeps and Chrysanthemum morifolium sinense.
