= Coleophora hancola =

Scientific classification
- Kingdom: Animalia
- Phylum: Arthropoda
- Class: Insecta
- Order: Lepidoptera
- Family: Coleophoridae
- Genus: Coleophora
- Species: C. hancola

Binomial name
- Coleophora hancola Oku, 1965

Species of moth

Coleophora hancola is a moth of the family Coleophoridae. It is found in Japan.

The wingspan is about 12 mm.

The larvae feed on Alnus japonica.
