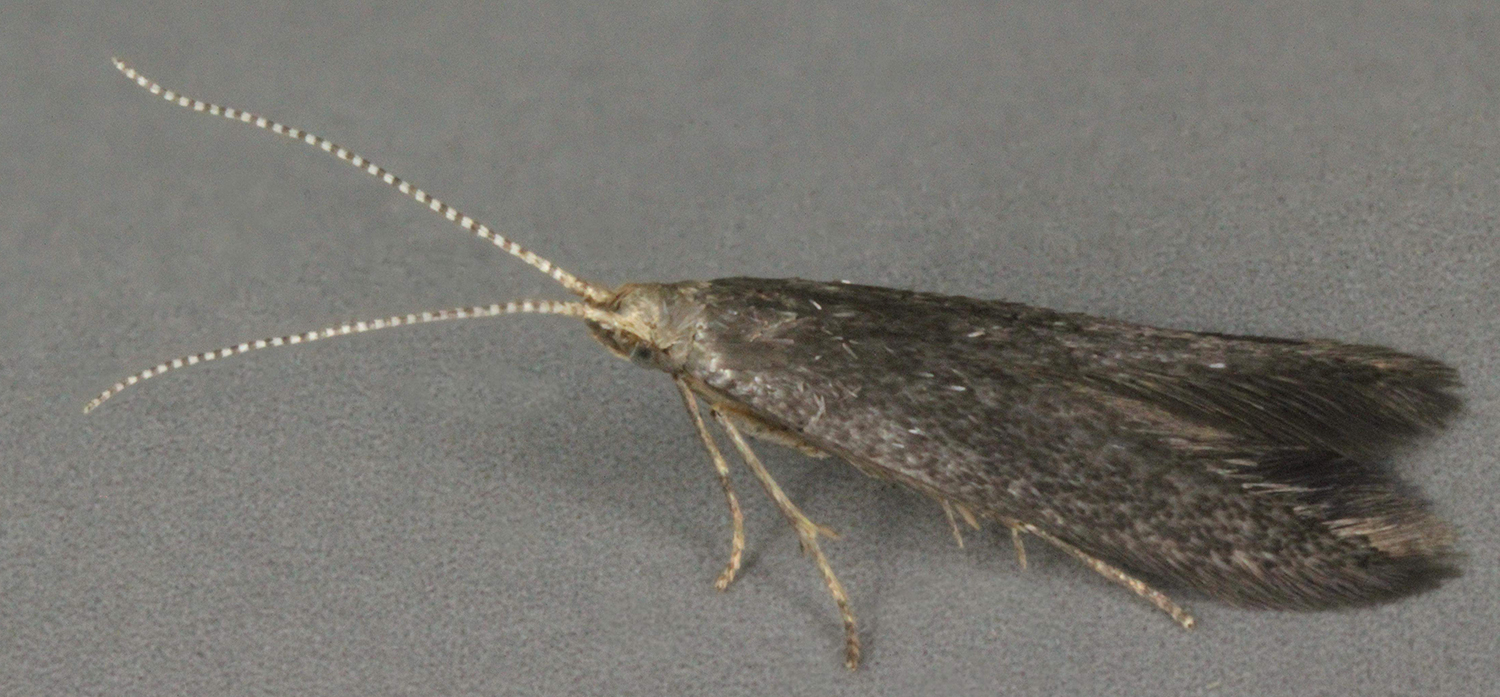
- Coleophora spinella, Deeside, North Wales

Scientific classification
- Kingdom: Animalia
- Phylum: Arthropoda
- Class: Insecta
- Order: Lepidoptera
- Family: Coleophoridae
- Genus: Coleophora
- Species: C. spinella

Binomial name
- Coleophora spinella (Schrank, 1802)

Synonyms
- Tinea spinella Schrank, 1802; Coleophora cerasivorella Packard, 1870

= Coleophora spinella =

Species of moth

Coleophora spinella, the apple-and-plum casebearer, is a moth of the family Coleophoridae. It is found in Europe, the Near East and North America.

The wingspan is 10–12 mm. Coleophora species have narrow blunt to pointed forewings and a weakly defined tornus. The hindwings are narrow-elongate and very long-fringed. The upper surfaces have neither a discal spot nor transverse lines. Each abdomen segment of the abdomen has paired patches of tiny spines which show through the scales. The resting position is horizontal with the front end raised and the cilia give the hind tip a frayed and upturned look if the wings are rolled around the body. C. spinella characteristics include forewing fuscous, ochreous brown or greyish without longitudinal streaks or white markings. The antenna are white with fuscous rings.

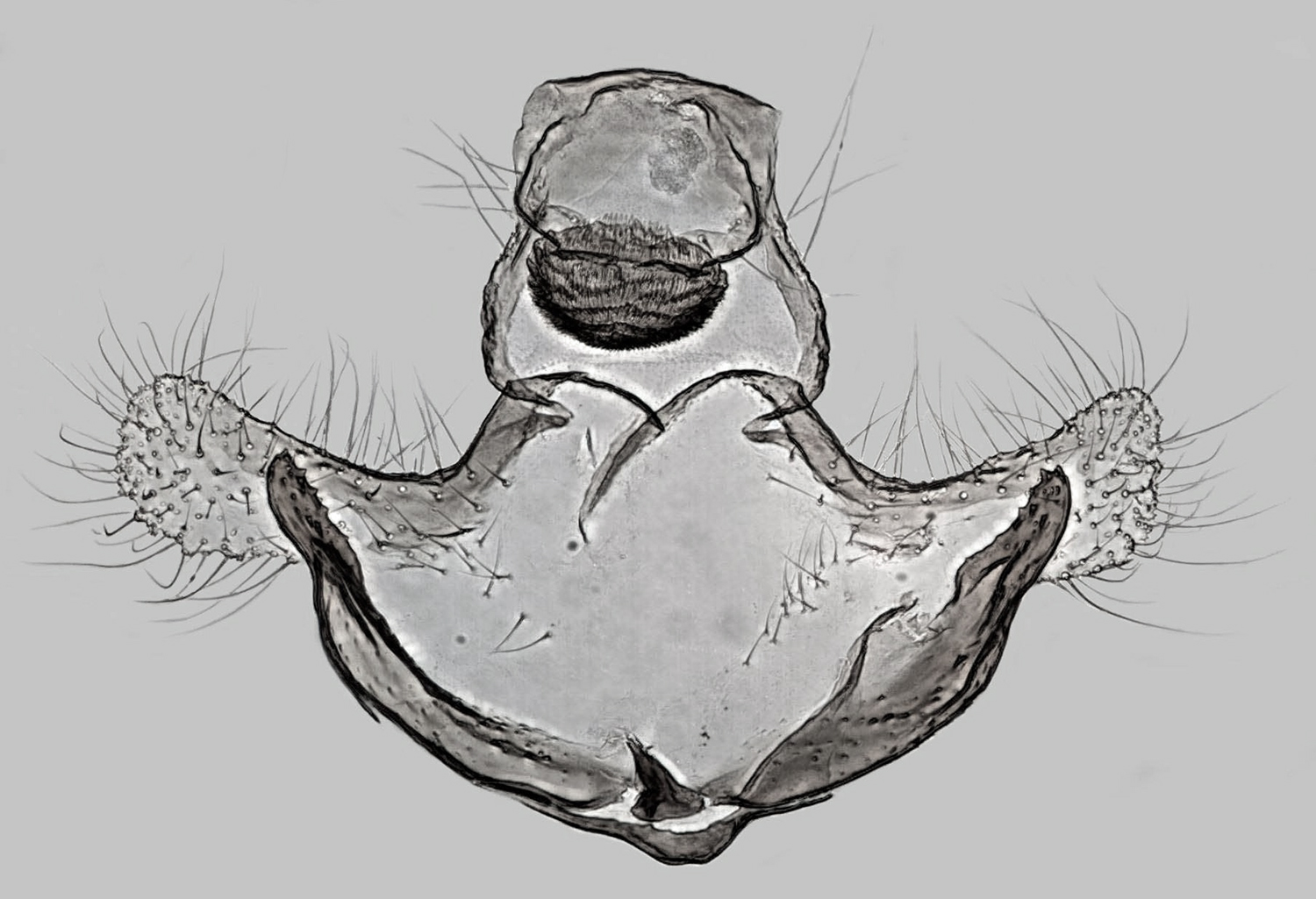
Genitalia preparation

C. spinella can only be reliably identified by dissection and microscopic examination of the genitalia.

The moth flies from June to July depending on the location.

The larvae feed on Crataegus, apple, Prunus cerasus, Prunus spinosa (and perhaps other Prunus), Pyrus communis (and perhaps other Pyrus species), Sorbus and Cotoneaster.
