= Daltopora sinanensis =

Scientific classification
- Domain: Eukaryota
- Kingdom: Animalia
- Phylum: Arthropoda
- Class: Insecta
- Order: Lepidoptera
- Family: Gelechiidae
- Genus: Daltopora
- Species: D. sinanensis

Binomial name
- Daltopora sinanensis Sakamaki, 1995

Species of moth

Daltopora sinanensis is a moth of the family Gelechiidae. It was described by Sakamaki in 1995. It is found in Korea, Japan and the Russian Far East.

The wingspan is 11-11.1 mm.
