= Coleophora laniella =

Scientific classification
- Kingdom: Animalia
- Phylum: Arthropoda
- Clade: Pancrustacea
- Class: Insecta
- Order: Lepidoptera
- Family: Coleophoridae
- Genus: Coleophora
- Species: C. laniella

Binomial name
- Coleophora laniella Baldizzone & Oku, 1990

Species of moth

Coleophora laniella is a moth of the family Coleophoridae. It is found on the island of Honshu in Japan.

The wingspan is about 12.5 mm.
