= Dichomeris horoglypta =

Scientific classification
- Kingdom: Animalia
- Phylum: Arthropoda
- Class: Insecta
- Order: Lepidoptera
- Family: Gelechiidae
- Genus: Dichomeris
- Species: D. horoglypta

Binomial name
- Dichomeris horoglypta Meyrick, 1932

Species of moth

Dichomeris horoglypta is a moth in the family Gelechiidae. It was described by Edward Meyrick in 1932. It is found on the Japanese islands of Honshu, Shikoku and in Korea.

The length of the forewings is 6–6.3 mm (0.24–0.25 in).

The larvae feed on Indigofera pseudotenctoria.
