= Elachista planicara =

Scientific classification
- Kingdom: Animalia
- Phylum: Arthropoda
- Class: Insecta
- Order: Lepidoptera
- Family: Elachistidae
- Genus: Elachista
- Species: E. planicara

Binomial name
- Elachista planicara Kaila, 1998

Species of moth

Elachista planicara is a moth in the family Elachistidae. It was described by Lauri Kaila in 1998. It is found in Japan (Hokkaidô, Honsyû, Sikoku, Kyûsyû) and the Russian Far East (Kuriles).

The length of the forewings is 4–5.2 mm for males and 4–5 mm for females. The autumn mine is wavy-linear. After hibernation, the mine becomes a blotch. Larvae can be found from late September to May.
