= Coleophora cristata =

Scientific classification
- Kingdom: Animalia
- Phylum: Arthropoda
- Clade: Pancrustacea
- Class: Insecta
- Order: Lepidoptera
- Family: Coleophoridae
- Genus: Coleophora
- Species: C. cristata

Binomial name
- Coleophora cristata Baldizzone, 1989

Species of moth

Coleophora cristata is a moth of the family Coleophoridae that can be found in Russian Far East, and in eastern Zhejiang, province of China.

The wingspan is about 13 millimetres (0.51 in).
