= Schiffermuelleria imogena =

Scientific classification
- Kingdom: Animalia
- Phylum: Arthropoda
- Class: Insecta
- Order: Lepidoptera
- Family: Oecophoridae
- Genus: Schiffermuelleria
- Species: S. imogena

Binomial name
- Schiffermuelleria imogena (Butler, 1879)

Synonyms
- Callixestis imogena Butler, 1879; Limnaecia imogena; Schiffermuellerina imogena; Gelechia imogena

Species of moth

Schiffermuelleria imogena is a moth in the family Oecophoridae first described by Arthur Gardiner Butler in 1879. It is found in Japan.

The wingspan is 16–20 mm (0.63–0.79 in).
