= Elachista bipunctella =

Scientific classification
- Kingdom: Animalia
- Phylum: Arthropoda
- Clade: Pancrustacea
- Class: Insecta
- Order: Lepidoptera
- Family: Elachistidae
- Genus: Elachista
- Species: E. bipunctella

Binomial name
- Elachista bipunctella (Sinev & Sruoga, 1995)

Synonyms
- Biselachista bipunctella Sinev & Sruoga, 1995

Species of moth

Elachista bipunctella is a moth in the family Elachistidae. It was described by Sinev and Sruoga in 1995. It is found in south-eastern Siberia and Japan. The habitat consists of boggy areas.

The length of the forewings is about 3.7 mm. There is probably one generation per year.
