= Cosmopterix setariella =

Scientific classification
- Kingdom: Animalia
- Phylum: Arthropoda
- Clade: Pancrustacea
- Class: Insecta
- Order: Lepidoptera
- Family: Cosmopterigidae
- Genus: Cosmopterix
- Species: C. setariella

Binomial name
- Cosmopterix setariella Sinev, 1985

Species of moth

Cosmopterix setariella is a moth of the family Cosmopterigidae. It is known from Russian Far East, China (Jiangxi), and Japan.

The length of the forewings is about 4.5 mm. The larvae feed on Setaria viridis.
