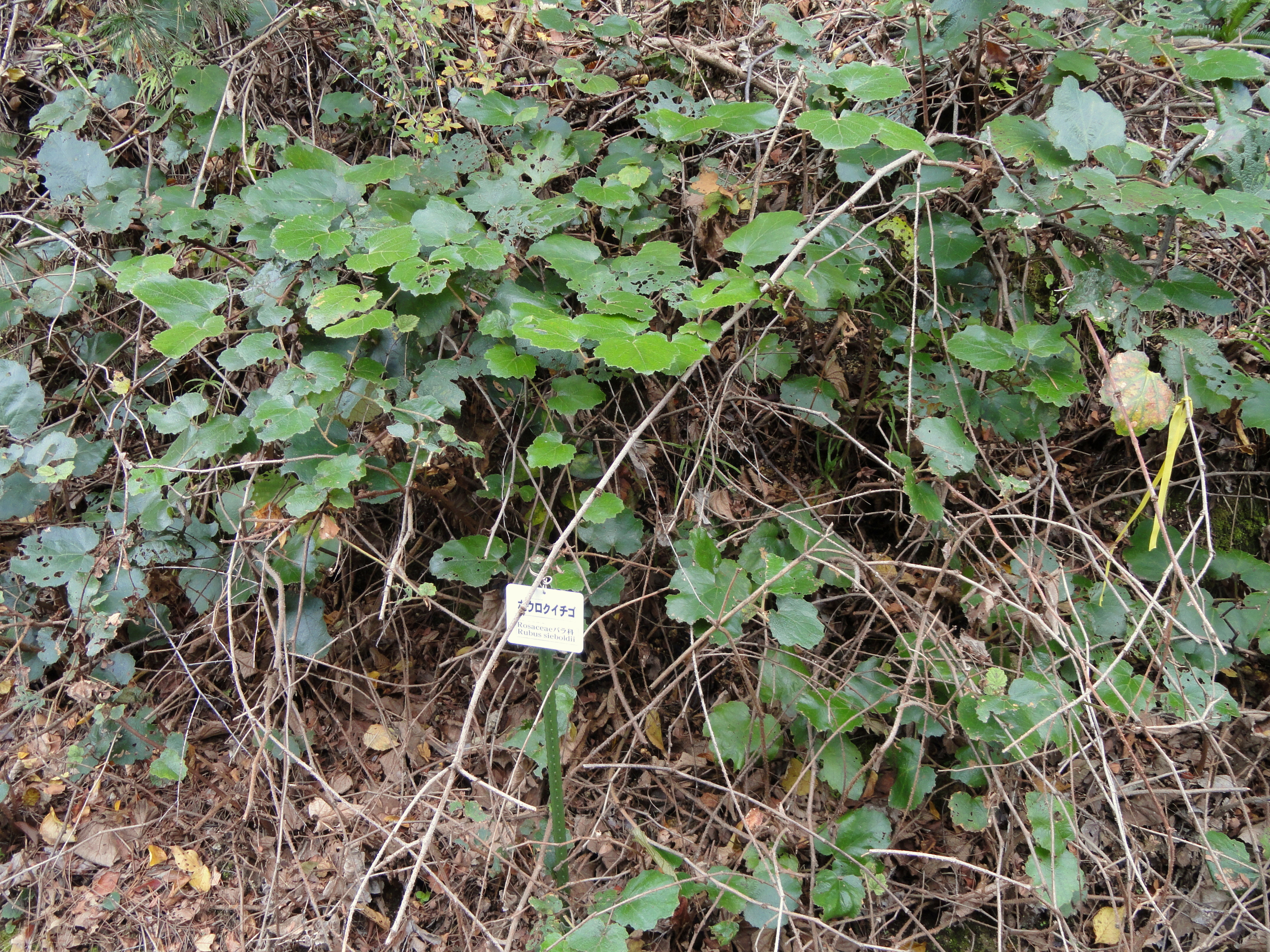

Scientific classification
- Kingdom: Plantae
- Clade: Embryophytes
- Clade: Tracheophytes
- Clade: Spermatophytes
- Clade: Angiosperms
- Clade: Eudicots
- Clade: Rosids
- Order: Rosales
- Family: Rosaceae
- Genus: Rubus
- Species: R. sieboldii

Binomial name
- Rubus sieboldii Blume

Synonyms
- Rubus abortivus Kuntze; Rubus subramiflorus Kuntze

= Rubus sieboldii =

Molucca raspberry

Species of flowering plant

Rubus sieboldii, the Molucca raspberry, is a flowering plant in the genus Rubus.

== Distribution and habitat ==
The species is native to Japan, including the Ryukyu Islands. The shrubs prefer low wetland areas, with very good sun exposure, though the plants can tolerate moderate shade.

== Uses ==
The plant's leaves stimulate blood flow in the pelvic area and uterus. They are also abortifacient and astringent, lending to their use to treat urinary tract infections.

Molucca raspberries are edible and contain large amounts of antioxidant power. They are rich with bioactive phytochemicals, antioxidant compounds, and show stronger radical scavenging activities than blueberries.
