= Coleophora ulmivorella =

Scientific classification
- Kingdom: Animalia
- Phylum: Arthropoda
- Class: Insecta
- Order: Lepidoptera
- Family: Coleophoridae
- Genus: Coleophora
- Species: C. ulmivorella

Binomial name
- Coleophora ulmivorella Oku, 1965

Species of moth

Coleophora ulmivorella is a moth of the family Coleophoridae. It is found in Japan.

The wingspan is about 9 mm.

The larvae feed on Ulmus davidiana var. japonica, Ulmus davidiana, Ulmus laciniata and Kalopanax ricinifolius. It is dark greyish-brown and 4.5-5.5 mm in length. The larvae mine into the leaf of their host plant until mid-June.
