= Ethmia dentata =

Scientific classification
- Kingdom: Animalia
- Phylum: Arthropoda
- Class: Insecta
- Order: Lepidoptera
- Family: Depressariidae
- Genus: Ethmia
- Species: E. dentata

Binomial name
- Ethmia dentata Diakonoff & Sattler, 1966

Species of moth

Ethmia dentata is a moth in the family Depressariidae. It is found in Japan, Taiwan, and the Philippines.
