= Ethmia okinawana =

Scientific classification
- Kingdom: Animalia
- Phylum: Arthropoda
- Clade: Pancrustacea
- Class: Insecta
- Order: Lepidoptera
- Family: Depressariidae
- Genus: Ethmia
- Species: E. okinawana

Binomial name
- Ethmia okinawana (Matsumura, 1931)

Synonyms
- Symmoca okinawana Matsumura, 1931

Species of moth

Ethmia okinawana is a moth in the family Depressariidae. It is found in Japan and Taiwan.
