= Cosmopterix infundibulella =

Scientific classification
- Kingdom: Animalia
- Phylum: Arthropoda
- Clade: Pancrustacea
- Class: Insecta
- Order: Lepidoptera
- Family: Cosmopterigidae
- Genus: Cosmopterix
- Species: C. infundibulella

Binomial name
- Cosmopterix infundibulella Sinev, 1988

Species of moth

Cosmopterix infundibulella is a moth in the family Cosmopterigidae. It was described by Sinev in 1988. It is found in the Russian Far East (Primorye).
