= Dichomeris praevacua =

Scientific classification
- Kingdom: Animalia
- Phylum: Arthropoda
- Class: Insecta
- Order: Lepidoptera
- Family: Gelechiidae
- Genus: Dichomeris
- Species: D. praevacua

Binomial name
- Dichomeris praevacua Meyrick, 1922

Species of moth

Dichomeris praevacua is a moth in the family Gelechiidae. It was described by Edward Meyrick in 1922. It is found in Shanghai, China.

The wingspan is about 16 mm (0.63 in). The forewings are pale ochreous yellow, the costa with a short dark fuscous streak on the base, then shortly strigulated with dark fuscous to a spot of dark grey irroration (sprinkles) at three-fourths. The dorsal edge is slightly speckled with grey and there are cloudy dark fuscous dots above and below the fold at one-fourth the upper posterior. The stigmata are blackish, the plical rather obliquely before the first discal and there is some slight grey irroration from the costal spot at three-fourths to a similar spot on the dorsum opposite. There is also an irregular streak of dark grey suffusion along the termen, thickest near the apex, sometimes black marked on the terminal edge. The hindwings are light grey, paler and thinly scaled towards the base.
