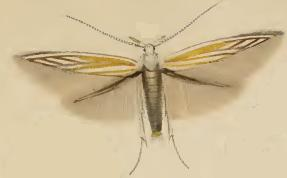

Scientific classification
- Kingdom: Animalia
- Phylum: Arthropoda
- Class: Insecta
- Order: Lepidoptera
- Family: Coleophoridae
- Genus: Coleophora
- Species: C. currucipennella

Binomial name
- Coleophora currucipennella Zeller, 1839

= Coleophora currucipennella =

Species of moth

Coleophora currucipennella is a moth of the family Coleophoridae found in Europe. It was first described by Philipp Christoph Zeller in 1839.

== Description ==
The wingspan is 13–16 mm.

== Distribution ==
The moth is found in most of Europe, except Ireland, the Iberian Peninsula and the Mediterranean Islands.
