= Coleophora flavovena =

Scientific classification
- Kingdom: Animalia
- Phylum: Arthropoda
- Class: Insecta
- Order: Lepidoptera
- Family: Coleophoridae
- Genus: Coleophora
- Species: C. flavovena

Binomial name
- Coleophora flavovena Matsumura, 1931

Species of moth

Coleophora flavovena is a moth of the family Coleophoridae. It is found in Japan (the islands of Hokkaido and Honshu), Korea, and southeastern Siberia.

The wingspan is 11–14 mm (0.43–0.55 in). Adults are on wing from late June to early August.

The larvae feed on the leaves of Artemisia princeps and Artemisia montana.
