= Streptomyces sasae =

Scientific classification
- Domain: Bacteria
- Kingdom: Bacillati
- Phylum: Actinomycetota
- Class: Actinomycetia
- Order: Streptomycetales
- Family: Streptomycetaceae
- Genus: Streptomyces
- Species: S. sasae

Binomial name
- Streptomyces sasae Lee and Whang 2015

Type strain
- KACC 17182, NBRC 109809, JR-39

Species of bacterium

Streptomyces sasae is a Gram-positive bacterium species from the genus of Streptomyces which has been isolated from rhizosphere soil from the bamboo Sasa borealis in Damyang in Korea.

== See also ==
- List of Streptomyces species
