= Coleophora levantis =

Scientific classification
- Kingdom: Animalia
- Phylum: Arthropoda
- Clade: Pancrustacea
- Class: Insecta
- Order: Lepidoptera
- Family: Coleophoridae
- Genus: Coleophora
- Species: C. levantis

Binomial name
- Coleophora levantis Baldizzone & Oku, 1988

Species of moth

Coleophora levantis is a moth of the family Coleophoridae. It is found on the island of Honshu in Japan.

The wingspan is 11–14 mm (0.43–0.55 in). Adults are on wing in July. The larvae feed on Quercus mongolica grosserata and Quercus serrata.
