= Coleophora falkovitshella =

Scientific classification
- Kingdom: Animalia
- Phylum: Arthropoda
- Class: Insecta
- Order: Lepidoptera
- Family: Coleophoridae
- Genus: Coleophora
- Species: C. falkovitshella

Binomial name
- Coleophora falkovitshella Vives, 1984

Synonyms
- Coleophora cornutella Falkovitsh, 1975

Species of moth

Coleophora falkovitshella is a moth of the family Coleophoridae. It is found in Mongolia and Korea.

Coleophora falkovitshella is the replacement name for Coleophora cornutella.
