= Dichomeris harmonias =

Scientific classification
- Kingdom: Animalia
- Phylum: Arthropoda
- Class: Insecta
- Order: Lepidoptera
- Family: Gelechiidae
- Genus: Dichomeris
- Species: D. harmonias

Binomial name
- Dichomeris harmonias Meyrick, 1922

Species of moth

Dichomeris harmonias is a moth in the family Gelechiidae. It was described by Edward Meyrick in 1922. It is found in south-eastern Siberia, Korea and China (Shanghai, Beijing).

The wingspan is about 14 mm (0.55 in). The forewings are ochreous orange with scattered deep greyish-purple scales and scattered deep greyish-purple strigulae on the costa, blackish on the edge. There is a spot of deep greyish-purple suffusion on the fold at one-fourth, as well as three narrow irregular deep greyish-purple fasciae, the first before the middle, rather oblique, hardly reaching the dorsum, the second at three-fourths, somewhat inwards oblique from the costa and the third terminal. The stigmata is dark grey, the first discal beyond the first fascia, the plical absorbed in this fascia, the second discal absorbed in the second fascia. The hindwings are grey.

The larvae feed on Lespedeza bicolor and Trifolium repens.
