= Elachista japonica =

Scientific classification
- Domain: Eukaryota
- Kingdom: Animalia
- Phylum: Arthropoda
- Class: Insecta
- Order: Lepidoptera
- Family: Elachistidae
- Genus: Elachista
- Species: E. japonica

Binomial name
- Elachista japonica (Parenti, 1983)

Synonyms
- Cosmiotes japonica Parenti, 1983

Species of moth

Elachista japonica is a moth in the family Elachistidae. It was described by Parenti in 1983. It is found in Japan.
