= Cosmopterix laetificoides =

Scientific classification
- Kingdom: Animalia
- Phylum: Arthropoda
- Clade: Pancrustacea
- Class: Insecta
- Order: Lepidoptera
- Family: Cosmopterigidae
- Genus: Cosmopterix
- Species: C. laetificoides

Binomial name
- Cosmopterix laetificoides Sinev, 1993

Species of moth

Cosmopterix laetificoides is a moth in the family Cosmopterigidae. It was described by Sinev in 1993. It is found in Russia and Japan.
