= Dichomeris atomogypsa =

Scientific classification
- Domain: Eukaryota
- Kingdom: Animalia
- Phylum: Arthropoda
- Class: Insecta
- Order: Lepidoptera
- Family: Gelechiidae
- Genus: Dichomeris
- Species: D. atomogypsa

Binomial name
- Dichomeris atomogypsa (Meyrick, 1932)

Synonyms
- Gaesa atomogypsa Meyrick, 1932

Species of moth

Dichomeris atomogypsa is a moth of the family Gelechiidae. It was described by Edward Meyrick in 1932. It is known from Korea and the Japanese islands of Honshu and Shikoku.

The larvae feed on Quercus acutissima, Q. dentata, and Q. serrata.
