= Dichomeris okadai =

Scientific classification
- Kingdom: Animalia
- Phylum: Arthropoda
- Class: Insecta
- Order: Lepidoptera
- Family: Gelechiidae
- Genus: Dichomeris
- Species: D. okadai

Binomial name
- Dichomeris okadai (Moriuti, 1982)

Synonyms
- Gaesa okadai Moriuti, 1982

Species of moth

Dichomeris okadai is a moth in the family Gelechiidae. It was described by Sigeru Moriuti in 1982. It is found in south-eastern Siberia, Shaanxi in China and Honshu in Japan.
