= Coleophora eteropennella =

Scientific classification
- Kingdom: Animalia
- Phylum: Arthropoda
- Clade: Pancrustacea
- Class: Insecta
- Order: Lepidoptera
- Family: Coleophoridae
- Genus: Coleophora
- Species: C. eteropennella

Binomial name
- Coleophora eteropennella Baldizzone & Oku, 1988

Species of moth

Coleophora eteropennella is a moth of the family Coleophoridae. It is found on the islands of Hokkaido and Honshu in Japan.

The wingspan is 11–13 mm (0.43–0.51 in). Adults are on wing in late June–July. The larvae feed on Ulmus japonica and possibly Betula platyphylla.
