= Elachista canis =

Scientific classification
- Domain: Eukaryota
- Kingdom: Animalia
- Phylum: Arthropoda
- Class: Insecta
- Order: Lepidoptera
- Family: Elachistidae
- Genus: Elachista
- Species: E. canis

Binomial name
- Elachista canis Parenti, 1983

Species of moth

Elachista canis is a moth in the family Elachistidae. It was described by Parenti in 1983. It is found in Japan (Hokkaidô, Honshû, Kyûshû, Ryûkyû) and the Russian Far East (Sakhalin).

The length of the forewings is 3.1–4.3 mm for males and 3.5–4.4 mm for females. Adults have been recorded on wing in early July.

The larvae feed on Sasa, Pleioblastus and Bambusa species, as well as Eccoilopus cotulifer.
