= Coleophora juncivora =

Scientific classification
- Kingdom: Animalia
- Phylum: Arthropoda
- Clade: Pancrustacea
- Class: Insecta
- Order: Lepidoptera
- Family: Coleophoridae
- Genus: Coleophora
- Species: C. juncivora

Binomial name
- Coleophora juncivora Baldizzone & Oku, 1990

Species of moth

Coleophora juncivora is a moth of the family Coleophoridae. It is found on Honshu island of Japan.

The wingspan is 9.5–10.5 mm (0.37–0.41 in).

The larvae feed on the seeds of Juncus krameri and Juncus leschenaultii.
