= Elachista microdigitata =

Scientific classification
- Domain: Eukaryota
- Kingdom: Animalia
- Phylum: Arthropoda
- Class: Insecta
- Order: Lepidoptera
- Family: Elachistidae
- Genus: Elachista
- Species: E. microdigitata

Binomial name
- Elachista microdigitata Parenti, 1983

Species of moth

Elachista microdigitata is a moth in the family Elachistidae. It was described by Parenti in 1983. It is found in Japan (Hokkaidô, Honsyû) and south-eastern Siberia.

The length of the forewings is 3.4–4 mm for males and 3.7–4.3 mm for females. Adults have been recorded on wing from late June to mid July, probably in one generation per year.
