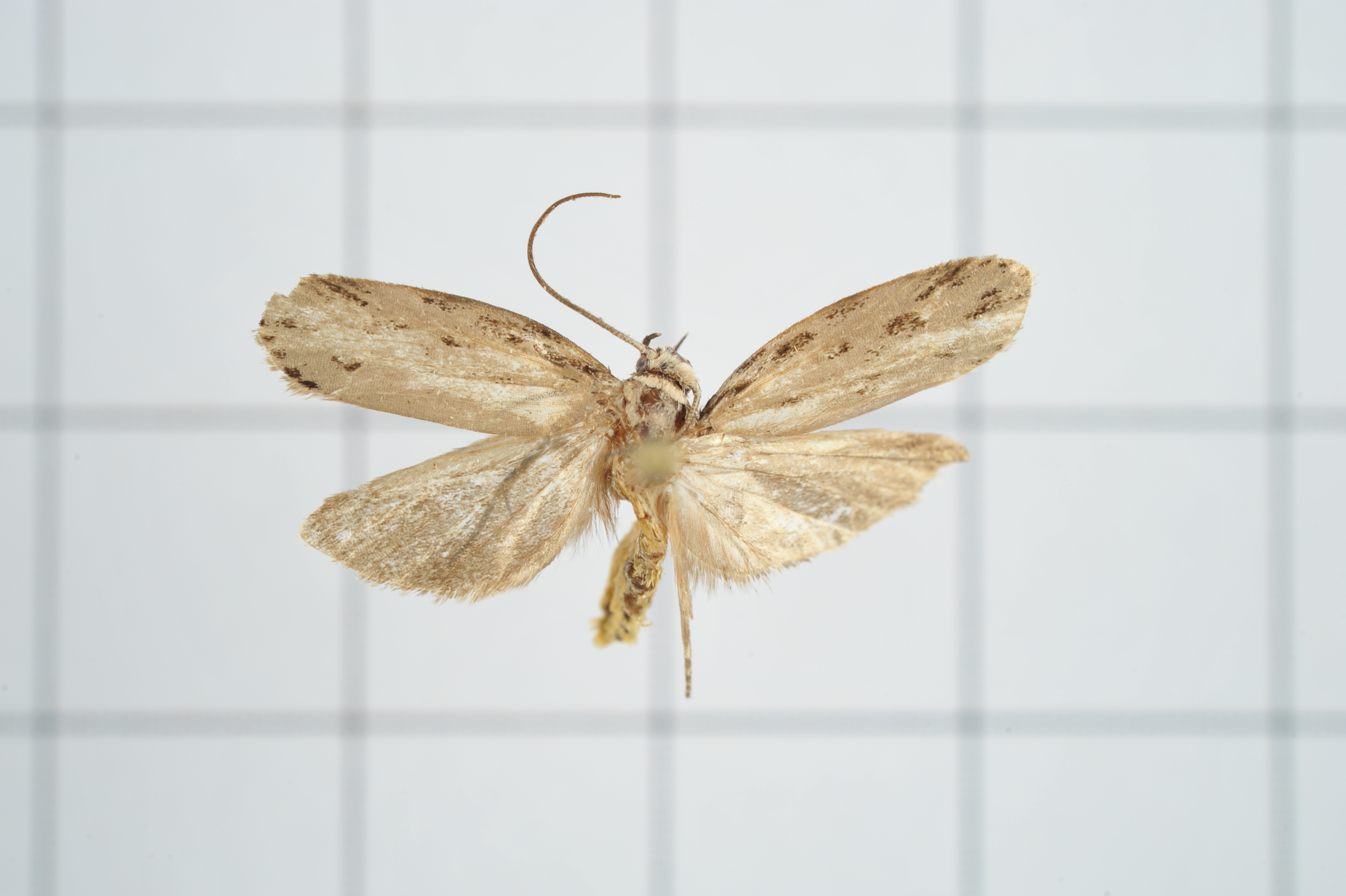

Scientific classification
- Kingdom: Animalia
- Phylum: Arthropoda
- Class: Insecta
- Order: Lepidoptera
- Family: Depressariidae
- Genus: Ethmia
- Species: E. epitrocha

Binomial name
- Ethmia epitrocha (Meyrick, 1914)

Synonyms
- Ceratophysetis epitrocha Meyrick, 1914

= Ethmia epitrocha =

Species of moth

Ethmia epitrocha is a moth in the family Depressariidae. It is found in Japan, China, and Taiwan.

The wingspan is 20–22 mm (0.79–0.87 in) for males and 22–25 mm (0.87–0.98 in) for females. Adults are on wing from March to September.

The larvae feed on Ehretia acuminata.
