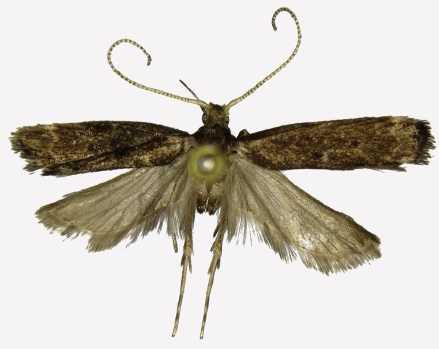

Scientific classification
- Kingdom: Animalia
- Phylum: Arthropoda
- Clade: Pancrustacea
- Class: Insecta
- Order: Lepidoptera
- Family: Lecithoceridae
- Genus: Halolaguna
- Species: H. sublaxata

Binomial name
- Halolaguna sublaxata Gozmány, 1978

= Halolaguna sublaxata =

Species of moth

Halolaguna sublaxata is a moth in the family Lecithoceridae. It is found in the provinces of Hubei, Jiangsu, Liaoning, Shanxi and Zhejiang in China, and in Taiwan, Korea and Japan.

The wingspan is 14–15 mm.
