= Carex blepharicarpa =

Scientific classification
- Kingdom: Plantae
- Clade: Tracheophytes
- Clade: Angiosperms
- Clade: Monocots
- Clade: Commelinids
- Order: Poales
- Family: Cyperaceae
- Genus: Carex
- Species: C. blepharicarpa

Binomial name
- Carex blepharicarpa Franch.

Species of grass-like plant

Carex blepharicarpa is a species of sedge with a native range consisting of Sakhalin in the Russian Far East, Korea and Japan including the Kuril Islands.
