= Cosmopterix phyllostachysea =

Scientific classification
- Kingdom: Animalia
- Phylum: Arthropoda
- Class: Insecta
- Order: Lepidoptera
- Family: Cosmopterigidae
- Genus: Cosmopterix
- Species: C. phyllostachysea

Binomial name
- Cosmopterix phyllostachysea Kuroko, 1957

Species of moth

Cosmopterix phyllostachysea is a moth of the family Cosmopterigidae. It is known from China (Jiangxi) and Japan.

The length of the forewings is about 6 mm. The larvae have been recorded feeding on bamboo, specifically on Phyllostachys bambusoides in Japan. They mine the leaves of their host plant. The mine has the form of a linear-blotch mine. The linear starts small, but gradually widens. The last instar larvae create an oval chamber. It later makes a smaller overwintering chamber of silk-like fiber within this bigger chamber. After overwintering, the larvae begin feeding on the mesophyll in March.
