= Elachista similis =

Scientific classification
- Kingdom: Animalia
- Phylum: Arthropoda
- Clade: Pancrustacea
- Class: Insecta
- Order: Lepidoptera
- Family: Elachistidae
- Genus: Elachista
- Species: E. similis

Binomial name
- Elachista similis Sugisima, 2005

Species of moth

Elachista similis is a moth in the family Elachistidae. It was described by Kazuhiro Sugisima in 2005. It is found in Japan (Hokkaidô, Honsyû, Kyûsyû) and in Korea.

The length of the forewings is 3.2–3.7 mm for males and 3.4–4 mm for females. The larvae feed on Carex foliosissima, Carex insaniae, Carex morrowii, Carex nakiri (Cyperaceae) and Luzula plumosa (Juncaceae). They mine the leaves of their host plant.

== Etymology ==
The species name refers to the resemblance to Elachista gleichenella and is derived from Latin similis.
