= Coleophora enkomiella =

Scientific classification
- Kingdom: Animalia
- Phylum: Arthropoda
- Clade: Pancrustacea
- Class: Insecta
- Order: Lepidoptera
- Family: Coleophoridae
- Genus: Coleophora
- Species: C. enkomiella

Binomial name
- Coleophora enkomiella Baldizzone & Oku, 1988

Species of moth

Coleophora enkomiella is a moth of the family Coleophoridae. It is found on the islands of Hokkaido and Honshu in Japan.

The wingspan is about 11 mm (0.43 in). Adults are on wing in high summer.

The larvae feed on Artemisia princeps and Artemisia montana. They make blotch-mines on the leaves of their host plant in autumn.
