= Coleophora cercidiphyllella =

Scientific classification
- Kingdom: Animalia
- Phylum: Arthropoda
- Class: Insecta
- Order: Lepidoptera
- Family: Coleophoridae
- Genus: Coleophora
- Species: C. cercidiphyllella

Binomial name
- Coleophora cercidiphyllella Oku, 1965

Species of moth

Coleophora cercidiphyllella is a moth of the family Coleophoridae. It is found on the Japanese islands of Hokkaido and Honshu.

The wingspan is 9.5–11 mm (0.37–0.43 in).

The larvae feed on Cercidiphyllum japonicum. They feed on the young leaves and can be found in May.
