= Cosmopterix rhyncognathosella =

Scientific classification
- Kingdom: Animalia
- Phylum: Arthropoda
- Clade: Pancrustacea
- Class: Insecta
- Order: Lepidoptera
- Family: Cosmopterigidae
- Genus: Cosmopterix
- Species: C. rhyncognathosella

Binomial name
- Cosmopterix rhyncognathosella Sinev, 1985

Species of moth

Cosmopterix rhyncognathosella is a moth of the family Cosmopterigidae. It is known from Russian Far East, China (Sichuan: Mount Emei), and Japan.

The length of the forewings is about 3.8 mm.
