= Dichomeris tostella =

Scientific classification
- Domain: Eukaryota
- Kingdom: Animalia
- Phylum: Arthropoda
- Class: Insecta
- Order: Lepidoptera
- Family: Gelechiidae
- Genus: Dichomeris
- Species: D. tostella

Binomial name
- Dichomeris tostella Stringer, 1930

Synonyms
- Dichomeris kawamurai Matsumura, 1931

Species of moth

Dichomeris tostella is a moth in the family Gelechiidae. It was described by Stringer in 1930. It is found in Japan, Korea, and the Russian Far East.

The wingspan is 18–23 mm (0.71–0.91 in). The forewings are yellowish ochreous.

The larvae feed on Malus pumila var. dulcissima, Prunus persica, and Prunus mume.
