= Cosmopterix gracilis =

Scientific classification
- Kingdom: Animalia
- Phylum: Arthropoda
- Clade: Pancrustacea
- Class: Insecta
- Order: Lepidoptera
- Family: Cosmopterigidae
- Genus: Cosmopterix
- Species: C. gracilis

Binomial name
- Cosmopterix gracilis Sinev, 1985

Species of moth

Cosmopterix gracilis is a moth of the family Cosmopterigidae. It is known from China (Jiangxi), Japan, Russian Far East, and Korea.

The length of the forewings is about 5.7 mm.
