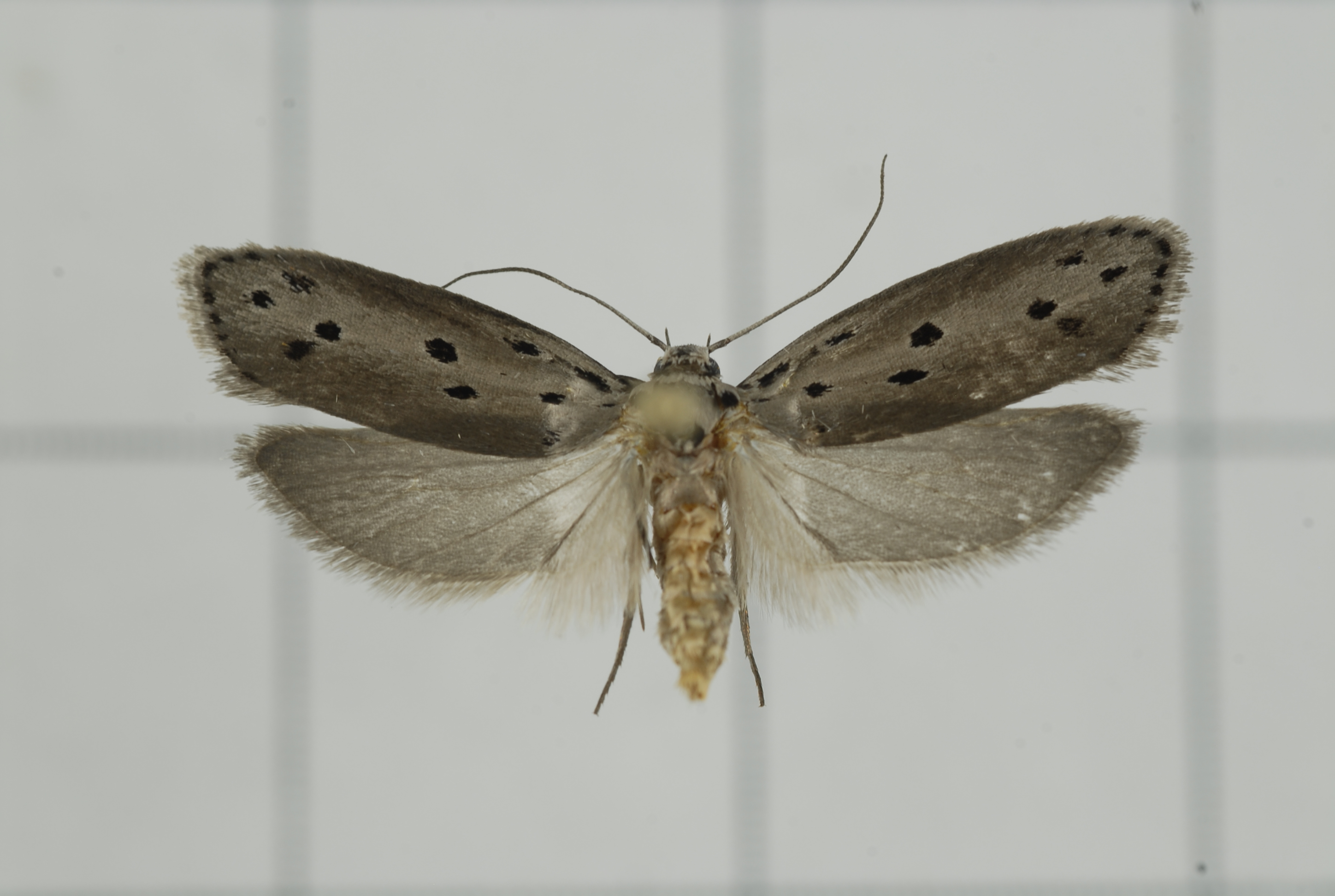

Scientific classification
- Domain: Eukaryota
- Kingdom: Animalia
- Phylum: Arthropoda
- Class: Insecta
- Order: Lepidoptera
- Family: Depressariidae
- Genus: Ethmia
- Species: E. lapidella

Binomial name
- Ethmia lapidella (Walsingham, 1880)

Synonyms
- Hyponomeuta lapidellus Walsingham, 1880; Psecadia decempunctella Matsumura, 1931

= Ethmia lapidella =

Species of moth

Ethmia lapidella is a moth in the family Depressariidae. It is found in India, Japan, China and Taiwan.

The wingspan is 19–21 mm (0.75–0.83 in). There are two generations per year with adults on wing from March to May and from September to October.

The larvae feed on Ehretia resinosa.
