= Cosmopterix kurilensis =

Scientific classification
- Kingdom: Animalia
- Phylum: Arthropoda
- Clade: Pancrustacea
- Class: Insecta
- Order: Lepidoptera
- Family: Cosmopterigidae
- Genus: Cosmopterix
- Species: C. kurilensis

Binomial name
- Cosmopterix kurilensis Sinev, 1985

Species of moth

Cosmopterix kurilensis is a moth in the family Cosmopterigidae. It was described by Sinev in 1985. It is found in Japan.
