= Coleophora japonicella =

Scientific classification
- Kingdom: Animalia
- Phylum: Arthropoda
- Class: Insecta
- Order: Lepidoptera
- Family: Coleophoridae
- Genus: Coleophora
- Species: C. japonicella

Binomial name
- Coleophora japonicella Oku, 1965

Species of moth

Coleophora japonicella is a moth of the family Coleophoridae. It is found in Japan and Korea.

The wingspan is about 10.5 mm for males and 11–13 mm for females.

The larvae feed on Ulmus davidiana var. japonica.
