= Dichomeris christophi =

Scientific classification
- Kingdom: Animalia
- Phylum: Arthropoda
- Clade: Pancrustacea
- Class: Insecta
- Order: Lepidoptera
- Family: Gelechiidae
- Genus: Dichomeris
- Species: D. christophi

Binomial name
- Dichomeris christophi Ponomarenko & Mey, 2002

Species of moth

Dichomeris christophi is a moth in the family Gelechiidae. It was described by Ponomarenko and Mey in 2002. It is found in Japan and the Russian Far East.
