= Coleophora neviusiella =

Scientific classification
- Kingdom: Animalia
- Phylum: Arthropoda
- Class: Insecta
- Order: Lepidoptera
- Family: Coleophoridae
- Genus: Coleophora
- Species: C. neviusiella

Binomial name
- Coleophora neviusiella Busck, 1904

Synonyms
- Coleophora eothina Falkovitsh, 1974

Species of moth

Coleophora neviusiella is a moth of the family Coleophoridae. It is found in eastern China and Primorye in the Russian Far East.

The larvae feed on the leaves of Malus, Prunus and Rubus species.
