= Elachista miscanthi =

Scientific classification
- Domain: Eukaryota
- Kingdom: Animalia
- Phylum: Arthropoda
- Class: Insecta
- Order: Lepidoptera
- Family: Elachistidae
- Genus: Elachista
- Species: E. miscanthi

Binomial name
- Elachista miscanthi Parenti, 1983

Species of moth

Elachista miscanthi is a moth of the family Elachistidae. It is found in the Japanese island of Honshu and Kyushu and in Taiwan.

The length of the forewings is 2.9-3.1 mm for males and 3-3.5 mm for females.
