= Lecithocera chersitis =

Scientific classification
- Kingdom: Animalia
- Phylum: Arthropoda
- Class: Insecta
- Order: Lepidoptera
- Family: Lecithoceridae
- Genus: Lecithocera
- Species: L. chersitis

Binomial name
- Lecithocera chersitis Meyrick, 1918

Species of moth in the genus Lecithocera

Lecithocera chersitis is a moth in the family Lecithoceridae. It was described by Edward Meyrick in 1918. It is found in Korea.

The wingspan is about 15 mm. The forewings are pale greyish ochreous irrorated (sprinkled) with fuscous. The discal stigmata are cloudy, rather dark fuscous, with an additional similar dot beneath the second. The hindwings are grey.
