= Ethmia nigripedella =

Scientific classification
- Kingdom: Animalia
- Phylum: Arthropoda
- Clade: Pancrustacea
- Class: Insecta
- Order: Lepidoptera
- Family: Depressariidae
- Genus: Ethmia
- Species: E. nigripedella

Binomial name
- Ethmia nigripedella (Erschoff, 1877)

Synonyms
- Psecadia nigripedella Erschoff, 1877; Psecadia nigripedella Rebel, 1901

Species of moth

Ethmia nigripedella is a moth in the family Depressariidae. It is found in Ukraine, Turkestan, Central Asia, eastern Siberia, Mongolia, northern Tibet, China (Kuku-Nor, Shansi) and Japan (Hokkaido, Kuschiro).

The length of the forewings is about 11 mm (0.43 in). Adults have been recorded from late April to early July.
