= Coleophora kamchatica =

Scientific classification
- Kingdom: Animalia
- Phylum: Arthropoda
- Class: Insecta
- Order: Lepidoptera
- Family: Coleophoridae
- Genus: Coleophora
- Species: C. kamchatica

Binomial name
- Coleophora kamchatica (Anikin, 1999)

Synonyms
- Casignetella kamchatica Anikin, 1999

Species of moth

Coleophora kamchatica is a moth of the family Coleophoridae. It is found in the Russian Far East.
