= Coleophora hsiaolingensis =

Scientific classification
- Kingdom: Animalia
- Phylum: Arthropoda
- Class: Insecta
- Order: Lepidoptera
- Family: Coleophoridae
- Genus: Coleophora
- Species: C. hsiaolingensis

Binomial name
- Coleophora hsiaolingensis Toll, 1942

Species of moth

Coleophora hsiaolingensis is a moth of the family Coleophoridae. It is found in China, Japan and Siberia.
