= Dichomeris issikii =

Scientific classification
- Domain: Eukaryota
- Kingdom: Animalia
- Phylum: Arthropoda
- Class: Insecta
- Order: Lepidoptera
- Family: Gelechiidae
- Genus: Dichomeris
- Species: D. issikii

Binomial name
- Dichomeris issikii (Okada, 1961)

Synonyms
- Telephila issikii Okada, 1961

Species of moth

Dichomeris issikii is a moth in the family Gelechiidae. It was described by Okada in 1961. It is found in Korea and Japan.
