= Protoparachronistis discedens =

Scientific classification
- Domain: Eukaryota
- Kingdom: Animalia
- Phylum: Arthropoda
- Class: Insecta
- Order: Lepidoptera
- Family: Gelechiidae
- Genus: Protoparachronistis
- Species: P. discedens

Binomial name
- Protoparachronistis discedens Omelko, 1986

Species of moth

Protoparachronistis discedens is a moth in the family Gelechiidae. It was described by Omelko in 1986. It is found in Russia and Japan.
