= Coleophora citrarga =

Scientific classification
- Kingdom: Animalia
- Phylum: Arthropoda
- Class: Insecta
- Order: Lepidoptera
- Family: Coleophoridae
- Genus: Coleophora
- Species: C. citrarga

Binomial name
- Coleophora citrarga Meyrick, 1934

Species of moth

Coleophora citrarga is a moth of the family Coleophoridae. It is found in Japan (Honshu island) and Taiwan.

The wingspan is 9–10 mm.
