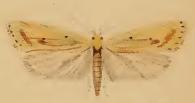

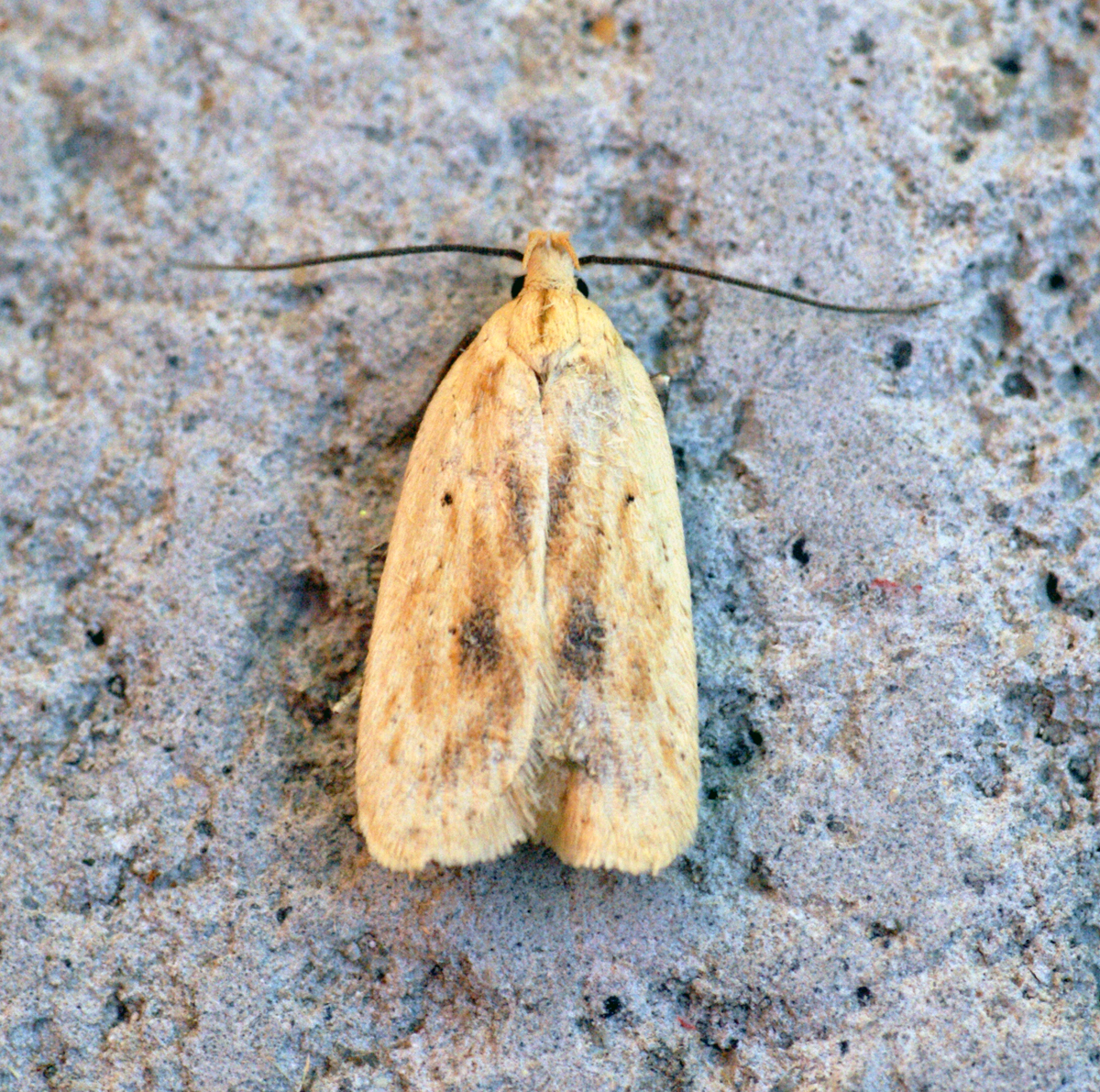

Scientific classification
- Kingdom: Animalia
- Phylum: Arthropoda
- Clade: Pancrustacea
- Class: Insecta
- Order: Lepidoptera
- Family: Depressariidae
- Genus: Agonopterix
- Species: A. kaekeritziana

Binomial name
- Agonopterix kaekeritziana (Linnaeus, 1767)

Synonyms
- Phalaena kaekeritziana Linnaeus, 1767; Tinea flavella Hubner, 1796; Tinea liturella Denis & Schiffermuller, 1775; Pyralis sparmanniana Fabricius, 1794; Phalaena hirundinella Villers, 1789; Depressaria corichroella Turati, 1924

= Agonopterix kaekeritziana =

Species of moth

Agonopterix kaekeritziana is a moth of the family Depressariidae. It is found in most of Europe (except the southern part of the Balkan Peninsula and Portugal) east to the Near East and the eastern part of the Palearctic realm.

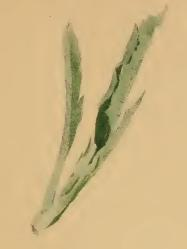
A shoot of Centaurea nigra folded by larva

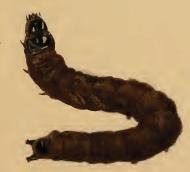
Larva

The wingspan is 19–23 mm. The forewings are whitish-ochreous, sometimes more or less mixed with pale ferruginous-ochreous, usually with a few blackish scales; first and second discal stigmata black, beneath second a dark grey spot, sometimes faint. Hindwings ochreous grey- whitish, greyer posteriorly. The larva is blackish; dots black; head and plate of 2 shining black.

Adults are on wing from July to September.

The larvae feed on Centaurea species, including Centaurea nigra and Centaurea scabiosa. They feed in spun or rolled leaves of their host plant. Larvae can be found from May to June. They are dark brown with a black head.
