= Coleophora chenopodii =

Scientific classification
- Kingdom: Animalia
- Phylum: Arthropoda
- Class: Insecta
- Order: Lepidoptera
- Family: Coleophoridae
- Genus: Coleophora
- Species: C. chenopodii

Binomial name
- Coleophora chenopodii Oku, 1965

Synonyms
- Coleophora chenopodi

Species of moth

Coleophora chenopodii is a moth of the family Coleophoridae. It is found in Japan.

The wingspan is about 13 mm.

The larvae feed on Chenopodium album. The larva feeds on the seeds of the host plant until October.
