= Coleophora yomogiella =

Scientific classification
- Kingdom: Animalia
- Phylum: Arthropoda
- Clade: Pancrustacea
- Class: Insecta
- Order: Lepidoptera
- Family: Coleophoridae
- Genus: Coleophora
- Species: C. yomogiella

Binomial name
- Coleophora yomogiella Oku, 1974

Species of moth

Coleophora yomogiella is a moth of the family Coleophoridae. It is found in Japan, Korea, and China (Yunnan).

The wingspan is 10–12 mm (0.39–0.47 in). The larvae feed on the leaves of Artemisia princeps and Artemisia montana.
