= Dichomeris junisonensis =

Scientific classification
- Kingdom: Animalia
- Phylum: Arthropoda
- Clade: Pancrustacea
- Class: Insecta
- Order: Lepidoptera
- Family: Gelechiidae
- Genus: Dichomeris
- Species: D. junisonensis

Binomial name
- Dichomeris junisonensis Matsumura, 1931

Species of moth

Dichomeris junisonensis is a moth in the family Gelechiidae. It was described by Shōnen Matsumura in 1931. It is found in Japan.
