= Elachista hiranoi =

Scientific classification
- Domain: Eukaryota
- Kingdom: Animalia
- Phylum: Arthropoda
- Class: Insecta
- Order: Lepidoptera
- Family: Elachistidae
- Genus: Elachista
- Species: E. hiranoi

Binomial name
- Elachista hiranoi Sugisima, 2005

Species of moth

Elachista hiranoi is a moth in the family Elachistidae. It was described by Sugisima in 2005. It is found in Japan (Kyushu, Honshu).

The length of the forewings is 3.5–4.3 mm for males and 3.4–4.1 mm for females.
