= Elachista sasae =

Scientific classification
- Kingdom: Animalia
- Phylum: Arthropoda
- Clade: Pancrustacea
- Class: Insecta
- Order: Lepidoptera
- Family: Elachistidae
- Genus: Elachista
- Species: E. sasae

Binomial name
- Elachista sasae Sinev & Sruoga, 1995

Species of moth

Elachista sasae is a moth in the family Elachistidae. It was described by Sinev and Sruoga in 1995. It is found in Japan (Hokkaidô, Honsyû) and the Russian Far East (Sakhalin).

The length of the forewings is 4–4.7 mm for males and 4.6–5.3 mm for females.

The larvae feed on Sasa (including Sasa kurilensis) and Pleioblastus species. They mine the leaves of their host plant. Larvae can be found from late-July to mid-August and again from October to May.
