= Hugo Theodor Christoph =

German-Russian entomologist (1831–1894)

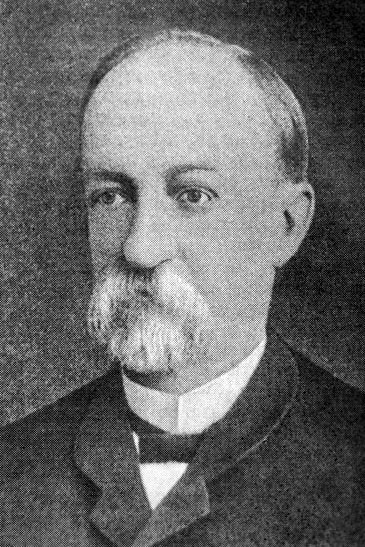
- Born: 16 April 1831
- Died: 5 November 1894 (aged 63)

Hugo Theodor Christoph (16 April 1831 – 5 November 1894) was a German and Russian entomologist.

Born in Herrnhut in Saxony, Hugo Theodor Christoph moved to Russia in 1858. He became a member of the Russian Entomological Society in 1861. From 1880, he was curator of the Lepidoptera collection of Grand Duke Nicholas Mikhailovich of Russia.

His own collection was sold to Thomas de Grey, 6th Baron Walsingham, a member of the Royal Entomological Society, and it is now in the Natural History Museum in London.
