= Teich =

Teich is a surname of German and Ashkenazi Jewish origin.

In German, the word "Teich" translates to “pond". The name likely originated as a toponymic surname, referring to individuals who lived near ponds or dikes, or who came from settlements named after these geographic features. The name was most prevalent in Silesia and Saxony.

In Yiddish, "Teich" ("טייך", also transliterated as "taykh") translates to "river" and is a cognate of the German word. Known variations of the name include Teichholtz, Teichtal, and Taich.

== Notable people ==
- Albert Teich (1929–2010), American lawyer and politician
- Alice Teichova (1920–2015), Austrian-born British economic historian
- Andrew Teich (born 1960), American businessman, inventor and entrepreneur
- Curt Teich (1877–1974), American publisher
- Erich Teich (1908–1983), Israeli musician and military officer
- Frank Teich (1856–1939), German-born American sculptor, stone carver, and businessman
- Jack Teich (born 1940), American business executive and kidnapping victim
- Karl August Teich (1838–1908), German entomologist
- Malvin Carl Teich (born 1939), American physicist and computational neuroscientist
- Meier Teich (1890–1975), Israeli Zionist and ghetto leader
- Mikuláš Teich (1918–2018), Slovak-British historian of science
- Nelson Teich (born 1957), Brazilian oncologist, former minister of health, and entrepreneur
- Tobias Teich (born 1984), German politician
