= Richard Davenport-Hines =

British historian and biographer (born 1953)

Richard Davenport-Hines FRSL FRHistS
- Born: Richard Peter Treadwell Davenport-Hines; June 21, 1953 (age 73)
- Education: Selwyn College, Cambridge

Richard Peter Treadwell Davenport-Hines (born 21 June 1953) is a British historian and literary biographer, and a Quondam Fellow of All Souls College, Oxford.

== Early life ==
Davenport-Hines was educated at St Paul's School, London (1967–71) and Selwyn College, Cambridge (which he entered as Corfield Exhibitioner in 1972 and left in 1977 after completing a PhD thesis on the history of British armaments companies during 1918–36). He was a research fellow at the London School of Economics (1982–86), where he headed a research project on the globalisation of pharmaceutical companies. He was joint winner of the Wolfson Prize for History and Biography in 1985 and winner of the Wadsworth Prize for Business History in 1986. He now writes and reviews in a number of literary journals, including the Literary Review and The Times Literary Supplement. He is an adviser to the Oxford Dictionary of National Biography, to which (as of December 2025) he has contributed 172 biographies. During 2016, he was visiting fellow at All Souls College, Oxford.

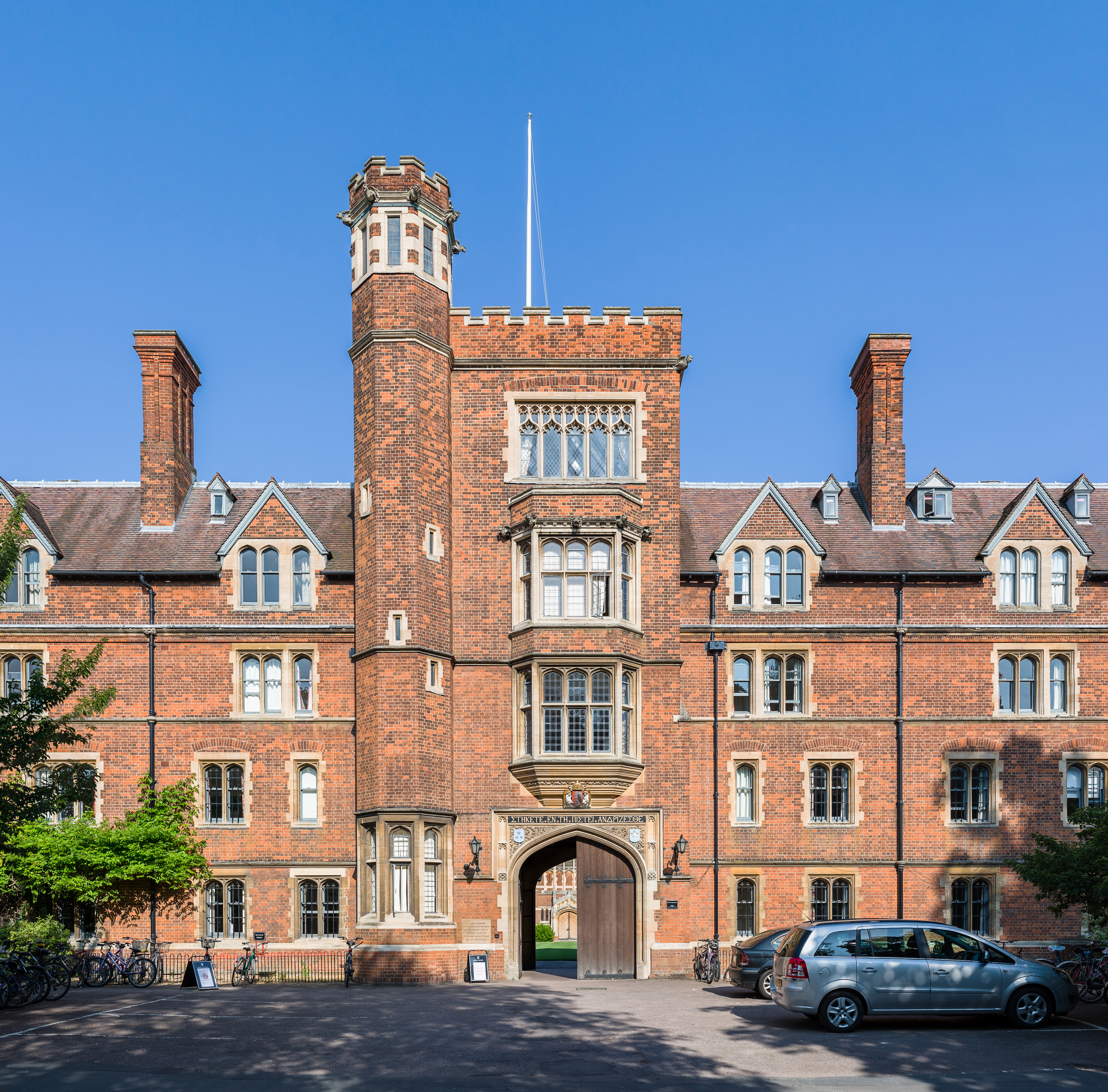
Davenport-Hines' Alma Mater, Selwyn College, Cambridge

== Career ==
He was a trustee of the London Library between 1996 and 2005, and was on the committee of the Royal Literary Fund from 2008 to 2018. He has been a Fellow of the Royal Society of Literature since 2003 and the Royal Historical Society since 1984. He was chairman of the judges of the Biographers' Club Prize in 2008, and of the judges of the PEN Hessell-Tiltman Prize for History in 2010. He has been a judge of the Elizabeth Longford Prize for Historical Biography since 2016.

He resigned from the Athenaeum club in 2023 in protest at the use of inclusivity and diversity criteria in its membership drive. He remains a member of Brooks's Club and the Beefsteak Club.

He is a judge of the Cosmo Davenport-Hines Prize for Poetry awarded annually since 2009 to members of King's College London – named in commemoration of his son who died on 9 June 2008, aged 21. He also inaugurated the Cosmo Davenport-Hines Memorial Lecture given from 2010 to 2015 under the joint auspices of King's College London and the Royal Society of Literature.

He was a leading signatory to a letter in The Guardian urging Britain to remain in the European Union during the membership referendum of 2016.

== Essays ==
He has contributed to several volumes of historical or literary essays. These include an essay on English and French armaments dealers operating in eastern Europe in the 1920s in Maurice Lévy-Leboyer, Helga Nussbaum and Alice Teichova (editors), Historical Studies in International Corporate Business (1989); an essay on HIV in Roy Porter and Mikulas Teich (editors), Sexual Knowledge, Sexual Science (1994); a historical critique of drugs prohibition laws in Selina Chen and Edward Skidelsky, High Time for Reform (2001); a chapter in the Cambridge Companion to W.H. Auden (2005); and a memoir in Peter Stanford (editor), The Death of a Child (2011).

== Works ==
- Dudley Docker: The Life and Times of a Trade Warrior (Cambridge University Press, 1984)
- Markets and Bagmen, Studies in the History of Marketing and British Industrial Performance, 1830–1939 (Ashgate, 1986) editor
- Speculators and Patriots: Essays in Business Biography (Cass, 1986)
- Business in the Age of Reason (Cass, 1987) editor with Jonathan Liebenau
- Enterprise Management and Innovation (Cass, 1988) editor with Geoffrey Jones
- British Business in Asia Since 1860 (Cambridge University Press, 1989) editor with Geoffrey Jones
- The End of Insularity – Essays in Comparative Business History (Cass, 1989) editor with Geoffrey Jones
- Business in the Age of Depression & War (Cass, 1990) editor
- Capital Entrepreneurs and Profits (Cass, 1990) editor
- Sex, Death and Punishment: Attitudes To Sex & Sexuality In Britain Since The Renaissance (Collins, 1990)
- Glaxo: A History to 1962 (Cambridge University Press, 1992) with Judy Slinn
- The Macmillans (Heinemann, 1992)
- Vice: An Anthology (Hamish Hamilton, 1993)
- Auden (Heinemann, 1995)
- Gothic: Four Hundred Years of Excess, Horror, Evil and Ruin (Fourth Estate, 1998)
- The Pursuit of Oblivion: A Global History of Narcotics 1500–2000 (Weidenfeld, 2001)
- A Night at the Majestic: Proust and the Great Modernist Dinner Party of 1922 (Faber, 2006) (in USA, Proust at the Majestic)
- Ettie: The Intimate Life and Dauntless Spirit of Lady Desborough (Weidenfeld, 2008)
- Titanic Lives: Migrants and Millionaires, Conmen and Crew (HarperCollins, 2012)
- An English Affair: Sex, Class and Power in the Age of Profumo (HarperCollins, 2013)
- Universal Man: The Seven Lives of John Maynard Keynes (Collins, 2015)
- Edward VII: The Cosmopolitan King (Penguin, 2016)
- Enemies Within: Communists, the Cambridge Spies and the Making of Modern Britain (HarperCollins, 2018)
- Hugh Trevor-Roper, Letters from Oxford: to Bernard Berenson (Weidenfeld, 2006) editor
- Hugh Trevor-Roper, Wartime Journals (I. B. Tauris, 2012). editor
- One Hundred Letters from Hugh Trevor-Roper (Oxford University Press, 2014). editor with Adam Sisman
- John Meade Falkner: Abnormal Romantic (Roxburghe Club, 2018).
- Hugh Trevor-Roper, China Journals: Ideology and Intrigue in the 1960s (Bloomsbury, 2020). editor
- Conservative Thinkers from All Souls College, Oxford (The Boydell Press, 2022)
- Picture Perfect: An Anthology of Poetry and Prose (Mount Orleans Press, 2023)
- History in the House: Some Remarkable Dons, and the Teaching of Politics Character and Statecraft (Collins, 2024)
