= Slovakia in History =

- Subject: History of Slovakia
- Genre: Non-fiction
- Publisher: Cambridge University Press

Slovakia in History is an edited collection of essays on the history of Slovakia in English published by Cambridge University Press in 2011, covering the period between the Duchy of Nitra in the first millennium and the 1993 dissolution of Czechoslovakia. The volume was edited by Cambridge University professor Mikuláš Teich and Dušan Kováč of the Slovak Academy of Sciences. Most of the contributors are historians with the Slovak Academy of Sciences. It received mixed reviews. James Mace Ward noted that book's coverage of twentieth-century history was much more in depth than its coverage of prior eras, and that non-Slovak peoples who lived in the territory of present-day Slovakia were ignored. The book was praised in Denník SME, which stated that it was the first time that an overview of Slovak history had been published by such a prestigious press in English and also felt that it was an evenhanded and objective book. However, Slovenské národné noviny criticized the book, arguing that the contributors were biased.
