= Psoricoptera speciosella =

Scientific classification
- Kingdom: Animalia
- Phylum: Arthropoda
- Clade: Pancrustacea
- Class: Insecta
- Order: Lepidoptera
- Family: Gelechiidae
- Genus: Psoricoptera
- Species: P. speciosella

Binomial name
- Psoricoptera speciosella Teich, 1892

Species of moth

Psoricoptera speciosella is a moth of the family Gelechiidae first described by Karl August Teich in 1892. It is found from northern and central Europe south to France, northern Italy and Romania. It is also found in the European part of Russia, Siberia, the Russian Far East and Japan.

The wingspan is 17–21 mm. Adults are on wing from March to August.

The larvae feed on Salix species, including S. caprea.
