= Gelechia bergiella =

Scientific classification
- Kingdom: Animalia
- Phylum: Arthropoda
- Clade: Pancrustacea
- Class: Insecta
- Order: Lepidoptera
- Family: Gelechiidae
- Genus: Gelechia
- Species: G. bergiella

Binomial name
- Gelechia bergiella Teich, 1886

Species of moth

Gelechia bergiella is a moth of the family Gelechiidae first described by Karl August Teich in 1886. It is found in Lithuania.
