= Psoricoptera latignathosa =

Scientific classification
- Kingdom: Animalia
- Phylum: Arthropoda
- Clade: Pancrustacea
- Class: Insecta
- Order: Lepidoptera
- Family: Gelechiidae
- Genus: Psoricoptera
- Species: P. latignathosa

Binomial name
- Psoricoptera latignathosa Park & Karsholt, 1999

Species of moth

Psoricoptera latignathosa is a moth of the family Gelechiidae. It was described by Kyu-Tek Park and Ole Karsholt in 1999. It is found in China and Korea.
