= Sharhorod Raion =

Former subdivision of Vinnytsia Oblast, Ukraine

Sharhorod Raion Шаргородський район
- Raion
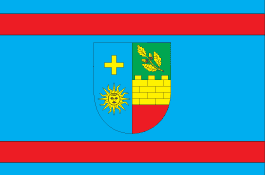
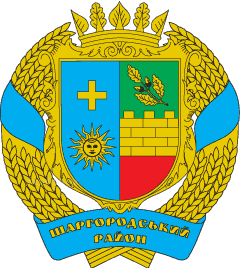
- Flag Coat of arms

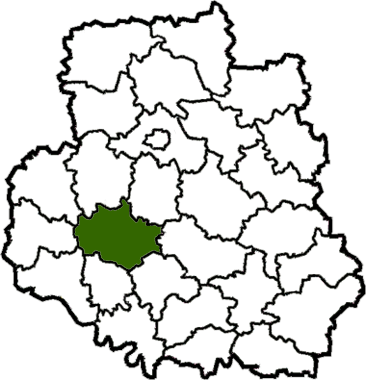
- Coordinates: 48°45′00″N 28°06′00″E
- Country: Ukraine
- Oblast: Vinnytsia Oblast
- Established: 4 January 1965
- Disestablished: 18 July 2020
- Admin. center: Sharhorod
- Subdivisions: List: 1 — city councils; 0 — settlement councils; 31 — rural councils; Number of localities: 1 — cities; 0 — urban-type settlements; 55 — villages; — rural settlements

Government
  - Governor: Mykola Slobldanyuk

Area
  - Total: 1,140 km^{2} (440 sq mi)

Population (2020)
  - Total: 55,359 ▼
  - Density: 48.6/km^{2} (126/sq mi)
- Time zone: UTC+02:00 (EET)
  - Summer (DST): UTC+03:00 (EEST)
- Postal index: 23500—23562
- Area code: +380 4344
- Website: http://sharrayrada.org.ua

Sharhorod Raion (Ukrainian: Шаргородський район) was one of raions of Vinnytsia Oblast, located in southwestern Ukraine. The administrative center of the raion was the town of Sharhorod. The raion was abolished and its territory was merged into Zhmerynka Raion on 18 July 2020 as part of the administrative reform of Ukraine, which reduced the number of raions of Vinnytsia Oblast to six. The last estimate of the raion population was 55,359 (2020 est.).
