= Psoricoptera arenicolor =

Scientific classification
- Domain: Eukaryota
- Kingdom: Animalia
- Phylum: Arthropoda
- Class: Insecta
- Order: Lepidoptera
- Family: Gelechiidae
- Genus: Psoricoptera
- Species: P. arenicolor

Binomial name
- Psoricoptera arenicolor Omelko, 1999

Species of moth

Psoricoptera arenicolor is a moth of the family Gelechiidae. It was described by Omelko in 1999. It is found in the Russian Far East, where it has been recorded from south-eastern Siberia and Sakhalin.
