= Regius Professor of English Literature =

The Regius Professor of English Literature is a Regius Professorship at the University of Aberdeen in Scotland. The first holder was appointed in 1894.

== List of Regius Professors of English Literature ==
- Herbert Grierson (1894 to 1915); first incumbent
- Adolphus Alfred Jack (1915 to 1938)
- Geoffrey Bickersteth (1938 to 1954)
- G. I. Duthie (1955 to 1967)
- Andrew Rutherford (1968 to 1984)
- R. P. Draper (1987 to 1994)
- George Rousseau (1994 to 1998)
- Peter R. K. A. Davidson (1998 to 2005)
- Alison Lumsden FRSE (2020 - )
