= Andrew Rutherford (English scholar) =

Scottish scholar and university administrator

Andrew Rutherford CBE (23 July 1929 – 13 January 1998) was a Scottish scholar and university administrator. He was Vice-Chancellor of the University of London from 1994-1997.

== Early life ==
He was born in Helmsdale, Sutherland, Scotland and educated at the local school. He then attended George Watson's College in Edinburgh and then the University of Edinburgh where he read English, graduating in 1951 with first class honours.

He did National Service with the Seaforth Highlanders from 1951 to 1953.

== Career ==
After BLitt studies at Merton College, Oxford, from 1953 to 1955, he was appointed assistant lecturer (1955) and then lecturer (1956) in English at the University of Edinburgh. In 1964 he joined the University of Aberdeen as senior lecturer progressing to Professor of English from 1965 to 1968. He then became Regius Professor of English Literature from 1968 to 1984, also holding various other administrative positions. He became Warden of Goldsmiths, University of London from 1984 to 1992 and Professor (Emeritus) from 1988 to 1992. He was Vice-Chancellor of the University from 1994 to 1997.

== Personal life ==
In 1953 he married Nancy Milroy Browning; they had two sons and a daughter. He died in Edinburgh. He was appointed CBE in 1993.

== See also ==
- List of Vice-Chancellors of the University of London

== Bibliography ==
- Byron, A Critical Study (1961) Oliver & Boyd ISBN 0050011634 ISBN 978-0050011638
- Byron: the Critical Heritage (1970) Routledge & Kegan Paul PLC ISBN 0710067291 ISBN 978-0710067296
- The Literature of War: Studies in Heroic Virtue (1978) Macmillan Press ISBN 0333461649
- Byron: Augustan and Romantic (1990)

Academic offices
Preceded by Lord Sutherland	Vice-Chancellor of University of London; 1994 – 1997	Succeeded by Professor Graham J. Zellick CBE QC
