= Graham J. Zellick =

Graham John Zellick CBE KC FRSA (born 12 August 1948) is a former Vice-Chancellor of the University of London, serving from 1997 to 2003. He was previously Principal of Queen Mary and Westfield College, London from 1991 to 1998.

== Early life ==
The son of R. H. Zellick and B. Sabovinsky, he was educated at Christ's College in Finchley, north London, before going to Gonville and Caius College, Cambridge, where he obtained a MA and a PhD, and then to Stanford Law School, where he was a Ford Foundation Fellow from 1970 to 1971.

== Positions ==
Professor Zellick served as Electoral Commissioner (2001–06) and was for nearly 20 years an academic lawyer at QMUL, where he was Head of the Department of Law, Dean of the Faculty of Laws, Professor of Public Law and Drapers' Professor of Law. He was also Chairman of the Committee of Heads of UK Law Schools and a member of the Lord Chancellor's Committee on Legal Education.

He was Editor of Public Law and founding Editor of European Human Rights Reports, as well as a member of the Data Protection Tribunal, the Criminal Injuries Compensation Appeals Panel, the Competition Appeal Tribunal, the Lord Chancellor's Advisory Committee and a member of the Legal Aid and the Criminal Justice Council. Also appointed a magistrate, he is a qualified barrister and Master of the Bench of the Middle Temple.

Zellick is an Honorary Fellow of Gonville and Caius College, Cambridge, a Fellow of the Institute for Advanced Legal Studies and an Academician of the Academy of Social Sciences. An Emeritus Professor of Law of the University of London, Visiting Professor of Law of Queen Mary and Honorary Professor of Law of the University of Birmingham, he has also been elected a Fellow of the Royal Society of Arts, an Honorary Fellow of the Royal Academy of Music and a Companion of the Chartered Management Institute. Zellick was, in 2010, a Distinguished Visiting Fellow to the New Zealand Law Foundation.

== Honours ==
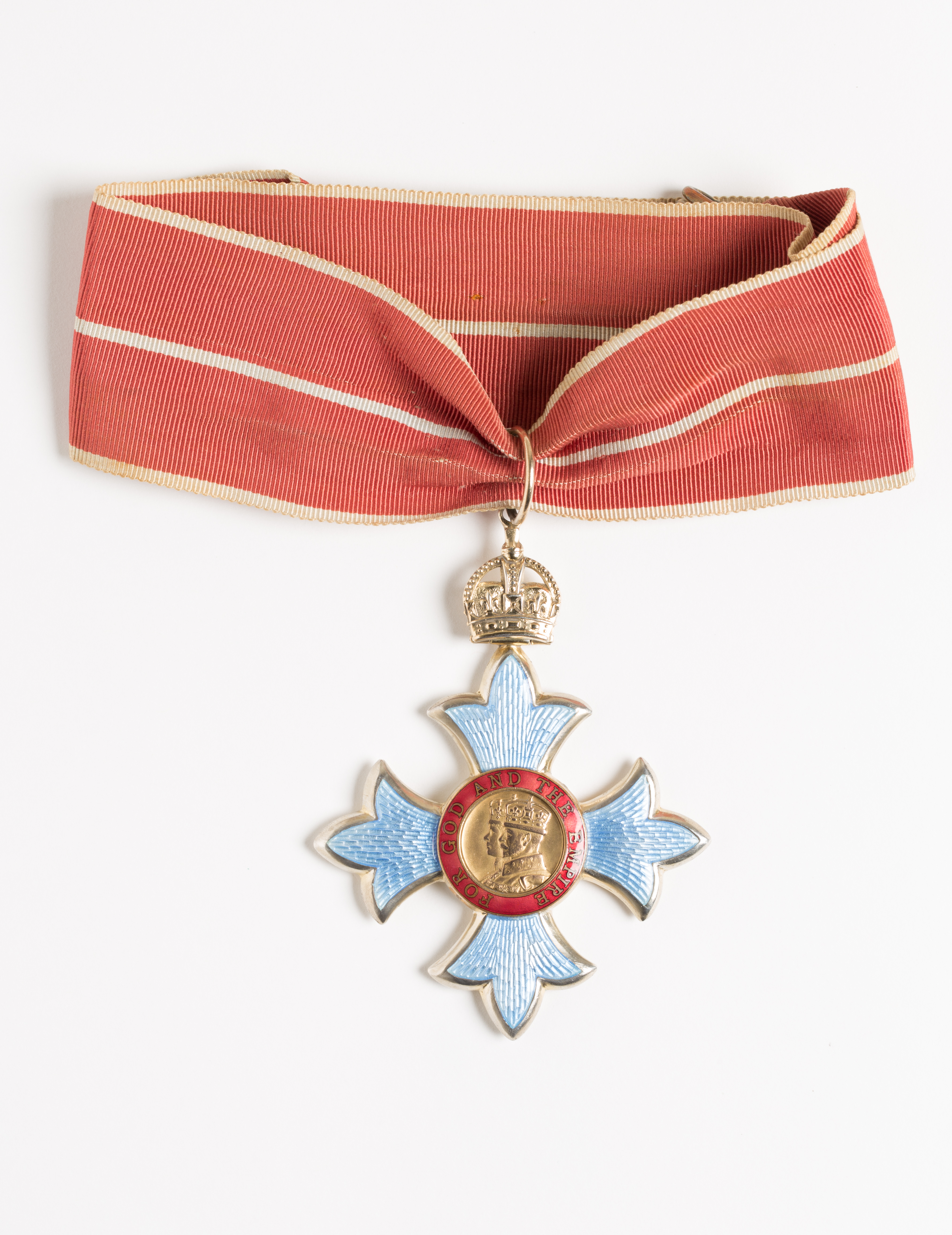
CBE insignia

Zellick was appointed a Commander of the Order of the British Empire in 2009 "for services to the administration of justice" and became a King's Counsel (KC) in 2010.

== Personal life ==
In 1975 he married Jennifer Temkin CBE (Professor of Law of the University of Sussex, 1992–2012, now Emerita); they have one son and one daughter.

== See also ==
- List of Vice-Chancellors of the University of London

Academic offices
Preceded by Professor Andrew Rutherford CBE	Vice-Chancellor of University of London; 1997 – 2003	Succeeded by Sir Graeme Davies
