= Sharhorod =

City in Vinnytsia Oblast, Ukraine

Sharhorod Шаргород Szarogród
- City
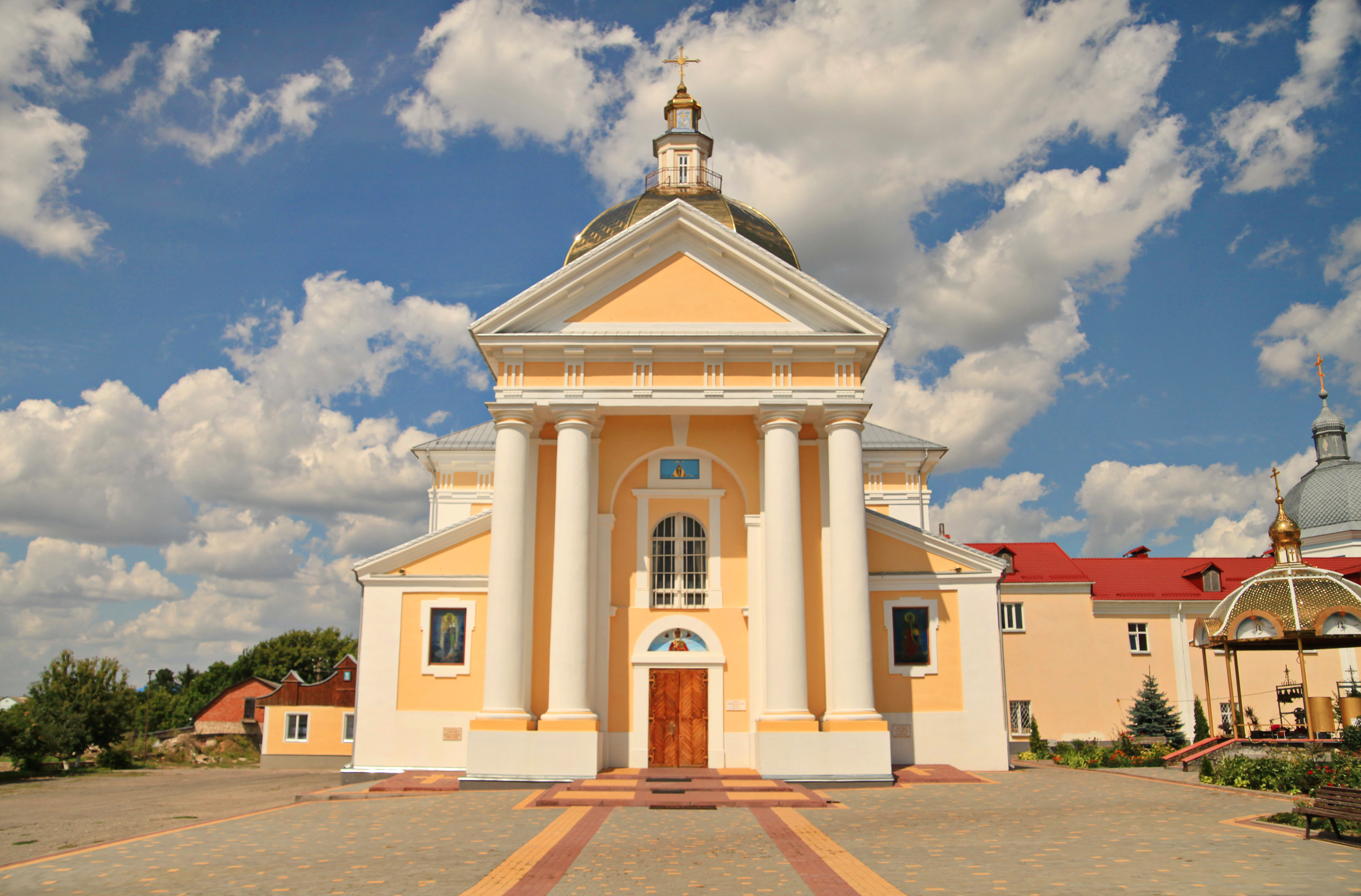
- Saint Nicholas Cathedral

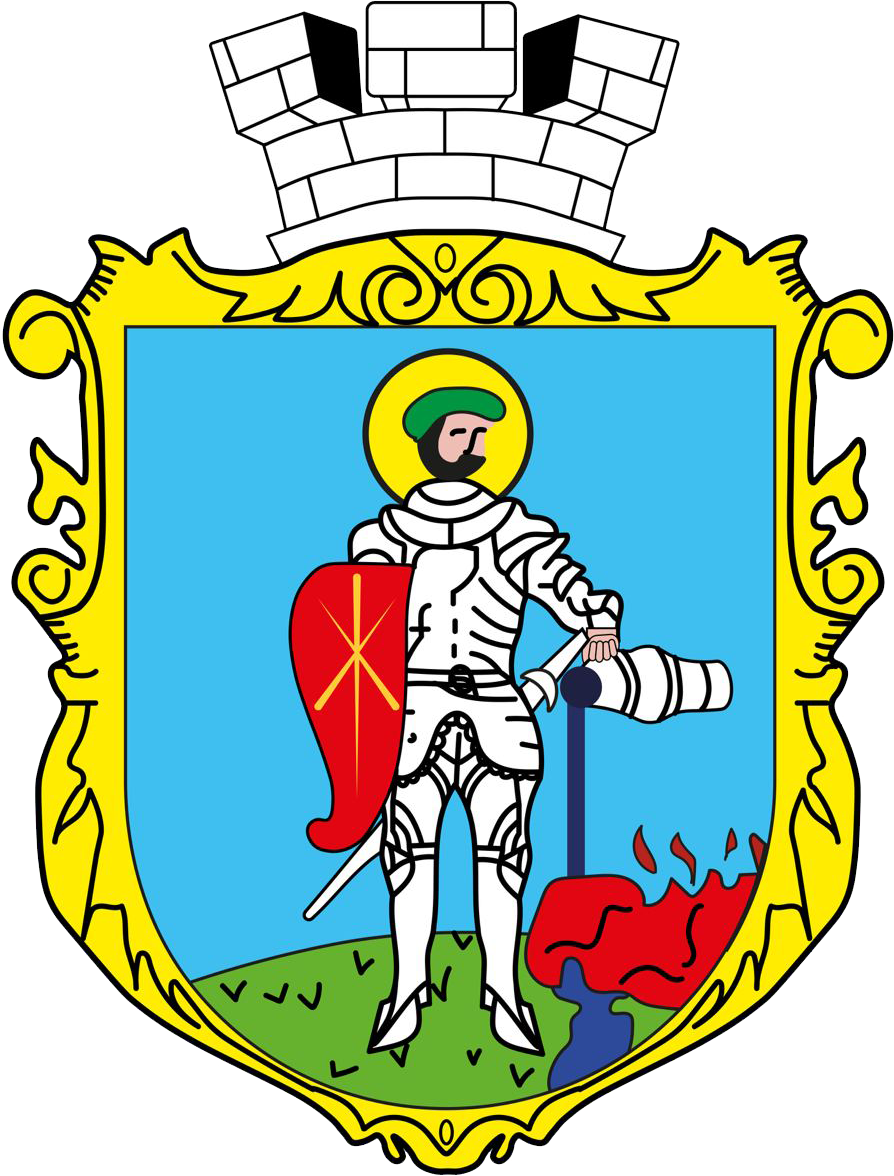
- Coat of arms

- Location of Sharhorod Sharhorod (Ukraine)
- Coordinates: 48°45′N 28°05′E
- Country: Ukraine
- Oblast: Vinnytsia Oblast
- Raion: Zhmerynka Raion
- Hromada: Sharhorod urban hromada
- Founded: 1585
- Magdeburg rights: 1588

Area
  - Total: 6.87 km^{2} (2.65 sq mi)
- Elevation: 245 m (804 ft)

Population (2022)
  - Total: 6,982
  - Density: 1,020/km^{2} (2,630/sq mi)
- Postal code: 23500 - 23504
- Area code: +380 4344
- Website: shargorod-miskrada.gov.ua

Sharhorod (Ukrainian: Шаргород, IPA: [ˈʃɑrɦorod]) is a small city located upon the Murashka river in the historical region of Eastern Podolia in Vinnytsia Oblast, Ukraine. It served as the administrative center of the former Sharhorod Raion until its dissolution in 2020. Population: 6,982 (2022 estimate).

Sharhorod also has a number of foreign names, such as Russian: Шаргород, Shargorod, and Polish: Szarogród.

== History ==
=== Early history ===
Sharhorod was founded in 1585 by Polish–Lithuanian Commonwealth chancellor and hetman, Jan Zamoyski as a fortress. It emerged on the site of the village of Korchmarove, which existed on the location in the 15th century. It was located very close to the border with the Ottoman Empire. Jan Zamoyski was known for establishing the Zamoyski family entail.

Sharhorod received city rights under Magdeburg law in 1588. Zamoyski later was heavily involved in neighboring "Moldavian Ventures" and Sharhorod is located relatively close to Moldavia.

Because of its location along wine and cattle trading routes, during the 16th and 17th centuries Sharhorod was fought over by Cossacks, Poles and Turks. It emerged as one of the largest towns in Podolia. The Turks occupied Sharhorod between 1672 and 1699, when the town was called "Little Istanbul". During that time, the synagogue was converted into a mosque. In the nineteenth century, the town became a center of Jewish Hasidism.

A Basilian monastery was established in Sharhorod in 1717; in 1795 it was transferred to the Orthodox Church and functioned until its dissolution during the 1920s.

Rabbi Jacob Joseph of Polonne fled to Raşcov as a result of being exiled from Sharhorod. Having been the rabbi of Sharhorod for several years, Rabbi Jacob Joseph was expelled from his position on a Friday afternoon in 1748. In several of his responsa, which he wrote in Raşcov, he reveals the suffering which he had undergone. He would later leave Raşcov after being appointed rabbi in Nemirov, a center of Hasidism, where he practiced daily fasting for five years, until the Besht came upon him.

From 1776 to 1792, the 7th Polish National Cavalry Brigade was garrisoned in Szarogród.

Sharhorod was briefly described in a book titled: "Geographic Dictionary of Polish Kingdom and other Slavic places," published in Warsaw in Poland.

=== World War II and the Holocaust ===
Before World War II, Sharhorod had a predominantly Jewish population. In 1939, approximately 1,660 Jews lived in the town, comprising about three-quarters of its population. German troops occupied Sharhorod on 22 July 1941. During the initial occupation, German soldiers subjected Jews to violence and looting and required them to pay special taxes and wear an armband bearing a Star of David.

In the autumn of 1941, Sharhorod was incorporated into the Romanian-administered Transnistria Governorate. Romanian authorities established a ghetto in the town and deported approximately 5,000 Jews from Bessarabia and Bukovina to Sharhorod, where they were confined together with the local Jewish population. By late 1941, approximately 1,800 local Ukrainian Jews were living alongside the deportees.

Unlike many of the smaller camps and ghettos in Romanian-controlled Transnistria, Sharhorod developed a comparatively extensive internal organization. The Jewish community was led by Meier Teich, formerly a leader of the Jewish community of Suceava. The ghetto administration organized a bakery, soup kitchen and other relief services, and the town's large synagogue was permitted to reopen. Approximately 400 Jews who escaped to Sharhorod from other places, including German-occupied territory east of the Southern Bug, were provided with documents by the Jewish committee.

Despite this degree of communal organization, conditions in the ghetto were severe. Its inhabitants were subjected to forced labour, overcrowding, hunger and disease. A major typhus epidemic during the winter of 1941–1942 killed 1,449 people. Romanian authorities also punished attempts to leave the ghetto; six Jews were executed on 20 March 1942 for leaving without permission. The epidemic subsequently subsided, and only four deaths from typhus were recorded between October 1942 and February 1943.

Jews from Sharhorod were also deported to forced-labour sites elsewhere in Transnistria. Nevertheless, the Sharhorod ghetto had a substantially higher survival rate than many of the camps and ghettos in the governorate. Romanian records showed approximately 1,800 local Jews still living there on 31 January 1943. On 1 September 1943, 2,971 deported Jews remained in Sharhorod, including 2,731 from Bukovina and 240 from Bessarabia.

In 1943, Romanian authorities dispersed approximately 1,000 Jews from the overcrowded Sharhorod ghetto among ten surrounding villages. About 500 Jews originally deported from Dorohoi County were transferred to Capușterna as part of this measure. Although conditions remained precarious, the relative stability of the ghetto's administration, assistance from Jewish relief organizations and relationships established between deportees and local Jews contributed to the survival of a substantial proportion of the ghetto population.

Romanian control of Sharhorod ended in March 1944 as the Red Army advanced through western Ukraine. The surviving deportees were subsequently able to leave the ghetto, and those from Romanian territories gradually returned to their former communities.

=== Postwar era ===
In 1984 the city's population reached 4,800 inhabitants. During that time Sharhorod was a centre of food industry.

== Religious buildings ==
=== Orthodox ===
St. Nicolas Orthodox Monastery - founded in 1719, initially constructed in 1782 and rebuilt in 1806–1818.

=== Catholic ===
St. Florian Catholic Cathedral - opened on November 3, 1525.

=== Jewish ===
Synagogue - built in 1589.

== Culture ==
The international modern arts festival "Art-City: Sharhorod" is conducted in Sharhorod.

Professional painters, amateur painters, art collectors and tourists from various countries like to attend the international modern arts festival "Art-City: Sharhorod".

== Transportation ==
=== Railway transportation ===
The nearest railway connection is the Yaroshenka railway station, located 28 km from the city.

=== Automobile transportation ===
There is a bus station in downtown Sharhorod. The road distance to Zmerynka is 37 km. The distance to Bar, Ukraine is around 60 km. The distance to Vinnytsia is 80.8 km. The distance to Kyiv is 330 km.

== Notable people ==
Jacob Joseph of Polonne, a Ukrainian rabbi and one of the first and most dedicated of the disciples of the founder of Chassidut, the Holy Baal Shem Tov.

== Gallery ==
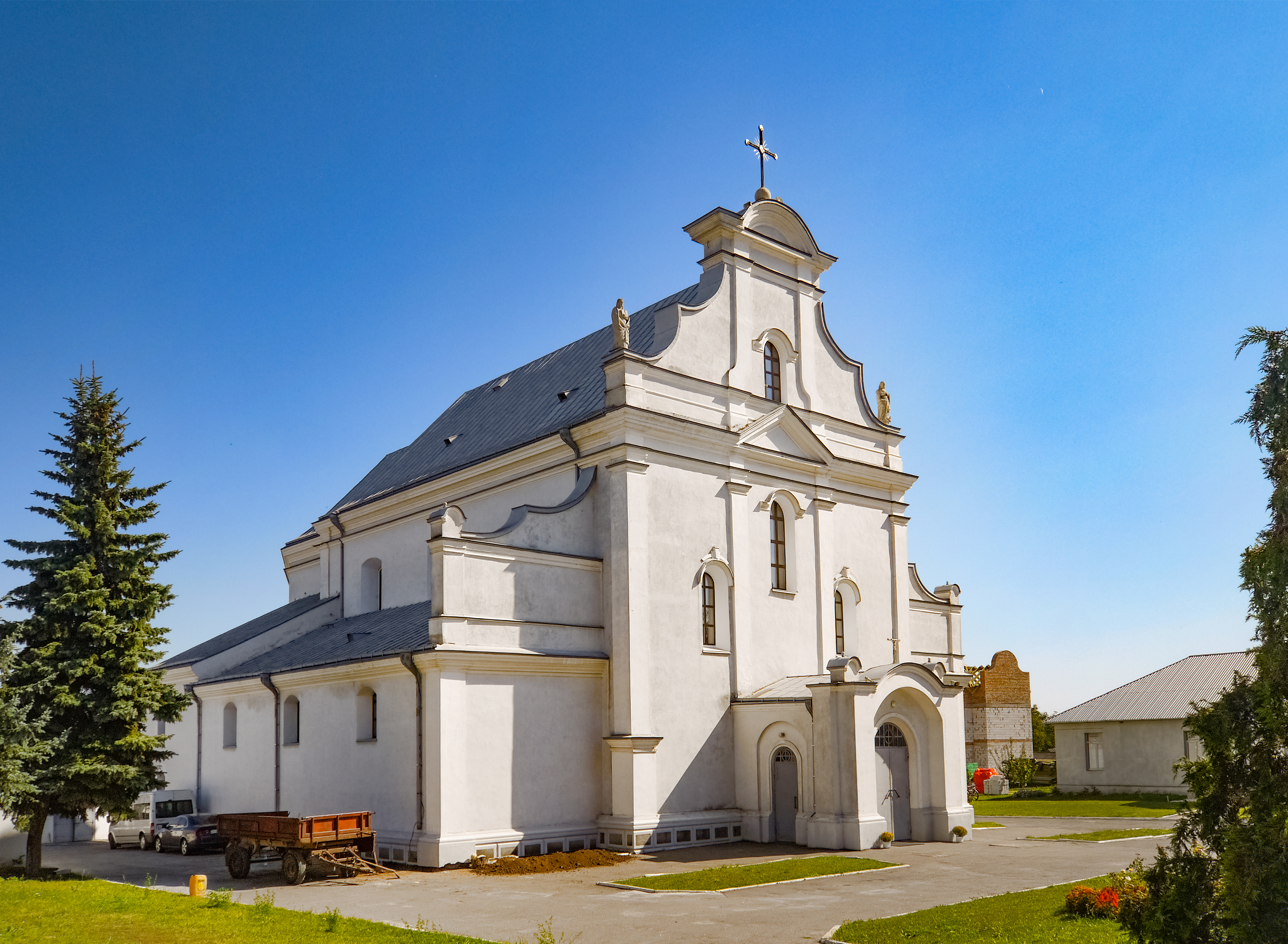
St. Florian Catholic church

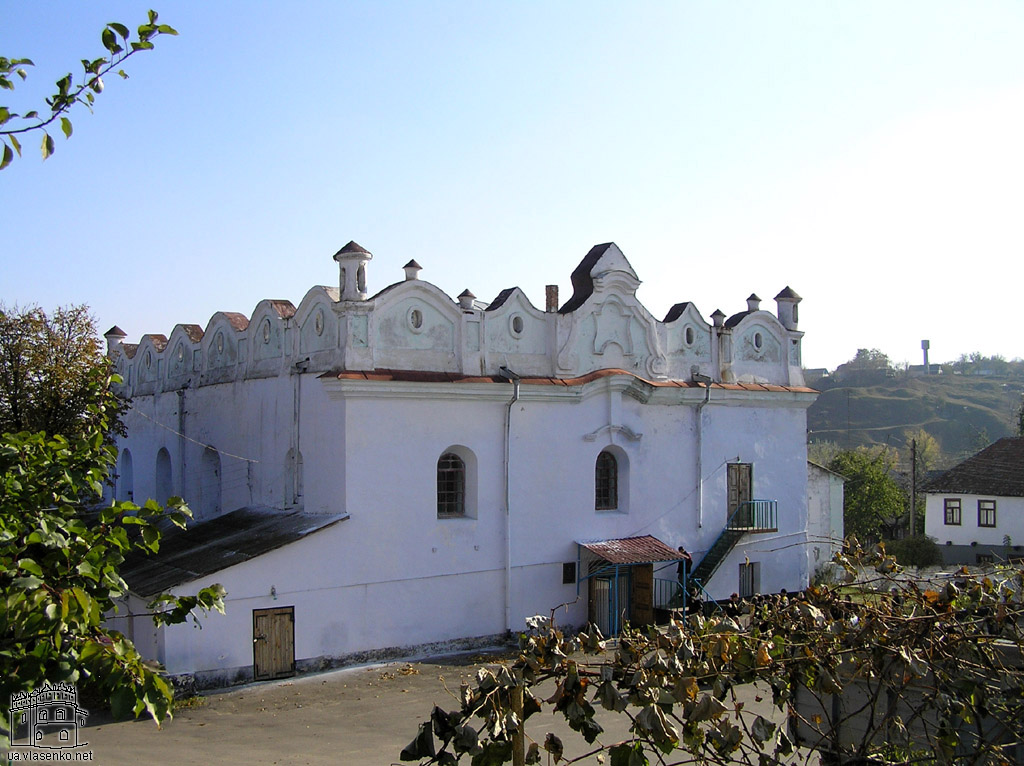
Synagogue

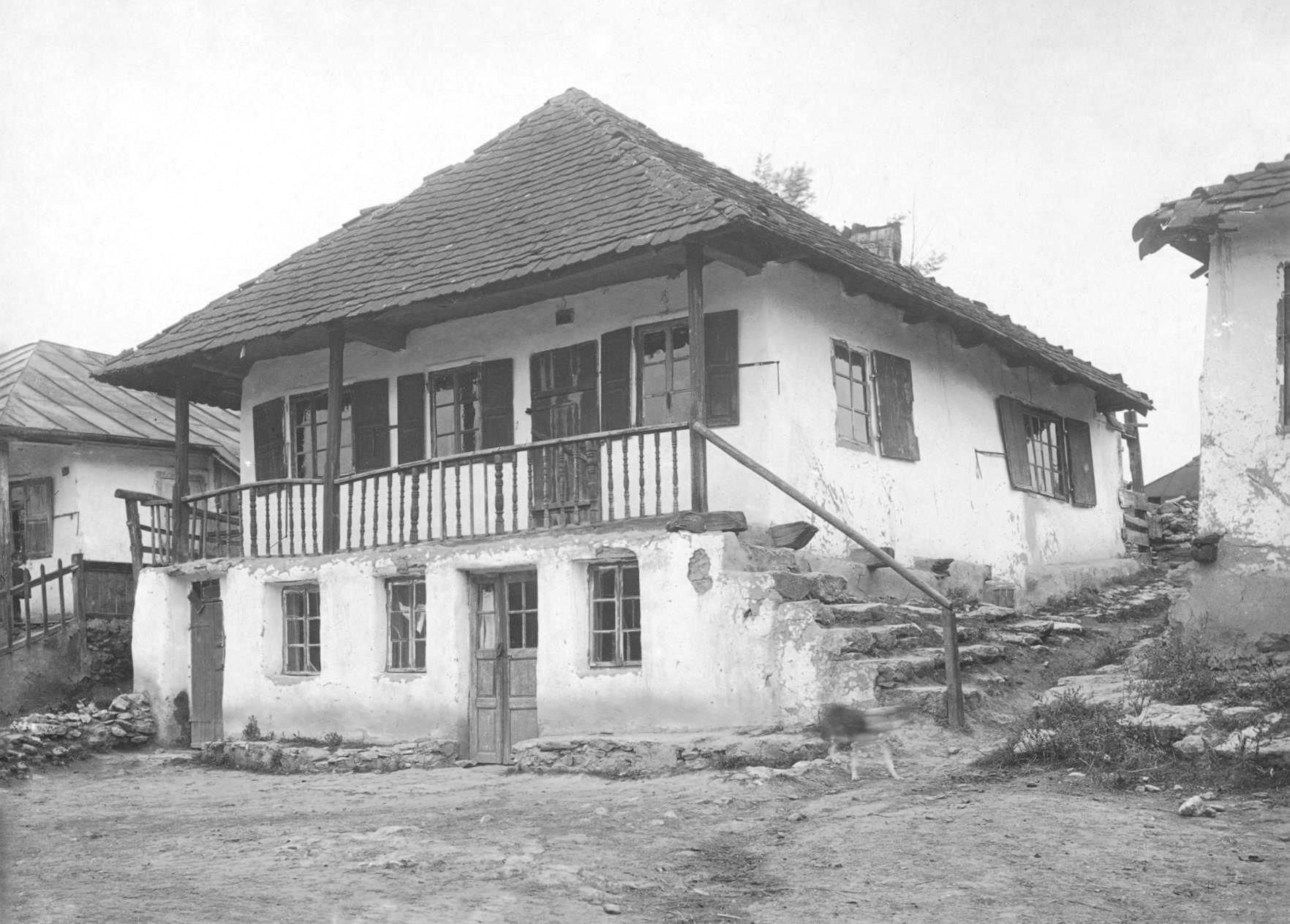
View of the Jewish shtetl of Sharhorod during the 1930s

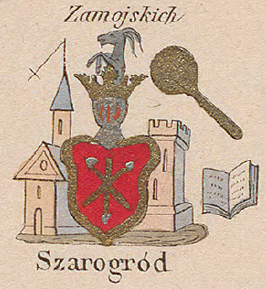
Emblem of Sharhorod on a 19th century map

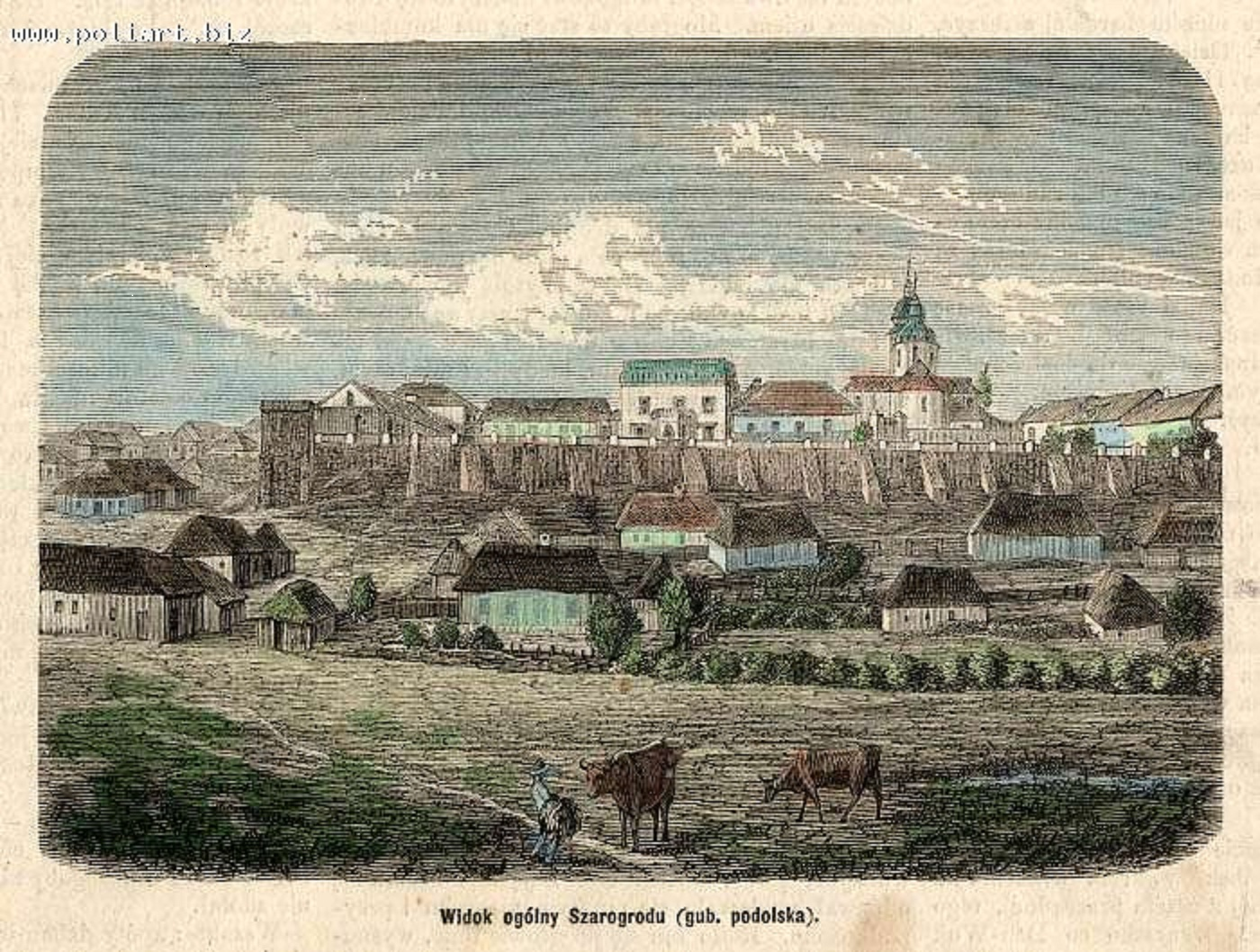
Historic image of Sharhorod
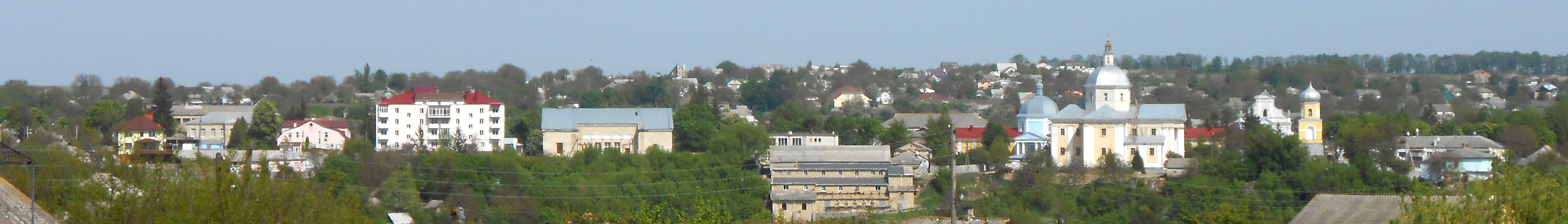
Modern skyline

== See also ==
- History of the Jews in Bessarabia
- History of the Jews in Transnistria
- History of the Jews in Bukovina
- Mohyliv-Podilskyi
- Dorohoi
- Dorohoi County
- Suceava
- Meier Teich
