= John Hill (botanist) =

English author and botanist (1716–1775)

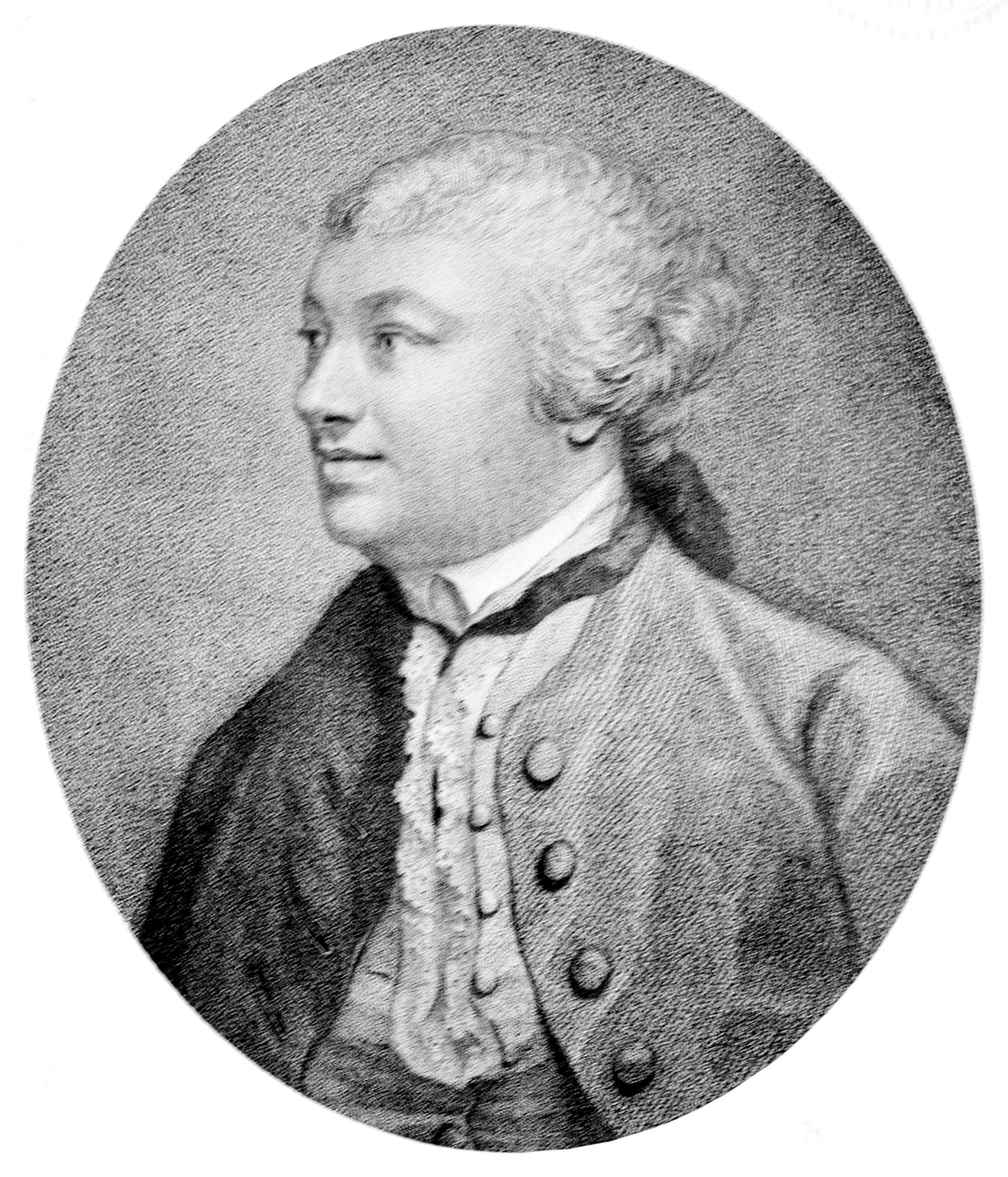
John Hill

Sir John Hill (c.1714 – 22 November 1775) was an English composer, actor, author and botanist. He contributed to contemporary periodicals and engaged in literary battles with poets, playwrights and scientists. He is remembered for his illustrated botanical compendium The Vegetable System, one of the first works to use the nomenclature of Carl Linnaeus. In recognition of his efforts, he was created a knight of the Order of Vasa in 1774 by Gustav III of Sweden and thereafter called himself Sir John Hill.

== Biography ==
John Hill was the son of the Rev. Theophilus Hill and is believed to have been born in Peterborough: he was baptised on 17 November 1714 at St John the Baptist Church in that city. He was apprenticed to an apothecary and on the completion of his apprenticeship he set up in a small shop in St Martin's Lane, Westminster. He also travelled over the country in search of rare herbs, with a view to publishing a hortus siccus, but the plan failed.

He obtained the degree of M.D. from the University of St. Andrews at a time when its fortunes were at a low ebb, and practised as a quack doctor, making considerable sums by the preparation of dubious herb and vegetable medicines. He was known for his "pectoral balsam of honey" and "tincture of bardana".

== Work ==
His first publication was a translation of Theophrastus's History of Stones (1746). From this time forward he was an indefatigable writer. He edited The British Magazine (1746–1750), and for two years (1751–1753) he wrote a daily letter, "The Inspector," for the London Advertiser and Literary Gazette. He also produced novels, plays and scientific works; and was a major contributor to the supplement of Ephraim Chambers's Cyclopaedia.

In Hill's 1754 book Urania: or, A Compleat View of the Heavens, he introduced 15 new constellations, representing creatures such as a toad (Bufo), a leech (Hirudo), a spider (Aranea), an earthworm (Lumbricus), and a slug (Limax). These constellations may simply have been intended as a joke; they never caught on with astronomers and are now disused (see Former constellations).

From 1759 to 1775 he was engaged on a huge botanical work, The Vegetable System (26 folio volumes), illustrated by 1,600 copper-plate engravings and published (plain) at thirty-eight guineas, and (coloured) at one hundred and sixty guineas. Hill's botanical labours were undertaken at the request of his patron, Lord Bute, and he was rewarded by the Order of Vasa from the King of Sweden in 1774. Hill used the Linnean binomial system first in his ''Flora Britannica'' (1760) and then from his second volume of ''The Vegetable System'' in 1761. He thus became the first English writer to adopt it. He however did not follow the taxonomic system of Linnaeus who commented that his book was one with beautiful plates but making him feel like weeping for it lacked "botanical science". Hill however liked English names and invented them for plants that did not occur in the English-speaking world.

Of the seventy-six separate works with which he is credited in the Dictionary of National Biography, the most valuable are those that deal with botany. He is reputed to have been the author of the second part of The Oeconomy of Human Life (1751), the first part of which is by Lord Chesterfield, and Hannah Glasse's famous manual of cookery was generally ascribed to him (see Boswell, ed. Hill, iii. 285). Samuel Johnson said of him that he was "an ingenious man, but had no veracity."

John Hill's often provocative and scurrilous writings involved him in many quarrels, both in the field of science and that of literature.

=== Quarrel with the Royal Society, 1750–1751 ===
During the 1740s, and especially in 1746–1747, Hill attended many meetings of the Royal Society, and there presented the results of several of his studies, both in the field of botany (on the propagation of moss), medicine (a surgical operation to remove a needle from the abdominal wall of a man), and geology-chemistry (on the origin of the sapphire's colour, on chrysocolla, on an alternative to Windsor loam for the making of fire-resistant bricks). His works On the manner of seeding mosses and On Windsor loam appeared in the Royal Society's journal, the Philosophical Transactions.

On the basis of these contributions, Hill apparently hoped to be elected Fellow of the Royal Society. Furthermore, he had the backing of several members of the Royal Society: the botanist Peter Collinson, the physician and scientist William Watson, and the antiquarian William Stukeley. Moreover, Hill had links with important nobles: John Montagu, 2nd Duke of Montagu and Charles Lennox, 2nd Duke of Richmond, also Fellows of the Royal Society; and Sir Thomas Robinson, Governor of Barbados and antiquarian. Despite Hill's merits as a scientist (at a time when many Fellows had no scientific background) and his relations, his election to the title of Fellow failed to materialise.

Disappointed by the Royal Society's lack, in his opinion, of scientific standards, Hill started to criticise the Society. In December 1749, he started writing anonymous, critical reviews of some articles published in the Philosophical Transactions. Moreover, in January 1750, Hill began a campaign of criticism and derision against the Royal Society and its president, Martin Folkes, by publishing, under an alias, a treatise entitled Lucina sine concubitu. A letter humbly address'd to the Royal Society; In which is proved, by most Incontestable Evidence, drawn from Reason and Practice, that a Woman may conceive and be brought to bed, without any commerce with Man. Under the false name of Abraham Johnson, a physician and man-midwife, Hill claimed to have observed cases where women had become pregnant without having had any kind of sexual relations with a man.

=== The "paper war" of 1752–1753 ===
Henry Fielding attacked him in The Covent Garden Journal, Christopher Smart wrote a mock-epic, The Hilliad, against him, and David Garrick replied to his strictures against him by two epigrams, one of which runs: "For physics and farces, his equal there scarce is; His farces are physic, his physic a farce is." He had other literary passages-at-arms with John Rich, who accused him of plagiarising his Orpheus, also with Samuel Foote and Henry Woodward.

=== Publications ===
- Lucine sine Concubitu [Childbirth without Lying Together], 1750, a spoof letter supposedly to the Royal Society under the alias Abraham Johnson.
- A Dissertation on Royal Societies, 1750.
- Review of the Works of the Royal Society of London, 1751.
- The Oeconomy of Human Life, 1751.
- A History of the Materia Medica, 1751.
- "The Inspector", London Advertiser and Literary Gazette, London, 1751–1753, a daily column that was the location of much of Hill's part in the Paper War.
- The Impertinent, 1752.
- Letters from the Inspector to a Lady with the Genuine Answers, 1752.
- Cyclopaedia, or, An Universal Dictionary of Arts and Sciences, vol. Supplement, 1753, various articles.
- Urania, or, A Complete View of the Heavens..., 1754.
- The Useful Family Herbal, 1755, reprinted 1810.
- Thoughts Concerning God and Nature, 1755.
- The British Herbal, 1756–1757.
- Eden, or, A Compleat Body of Gardening, 1757, with Thomas Hale.
- Outlines of a System of Vegetable Generation, 1758.
- The Virtues of Honey in Preventing Many of the Worst Disorders, 1759.
- The Vegetable System, 1759–1775, 26 volumes in folio.
  - Vol. I (1759 octavo edition)
  - Vol. II, Part I (1761)
  - Vol. II, Part II (1761)
  - Vol. III (1761)
  - Vol. IV (1762)
  - Vol. V (1763)
- Hortus Kewensis... [Kew Garden...] (in Latin) (1st ed.), London: Richard Baldwin & John Ridley, 1768.
- Hortus Kewensis... [Kew Garden...] (in Latin) (2nd ed.), London: Richard Baldwin & John Ridley, 1769.
- The Construction of Timber from Its Early Growth, 1770.
- Virtues of British Herbs, 1770–1772.
  - No. 1 (1770)
  - 4th ed., with additions (1771)
  - 1772 edition
- A Decade of Curious Insects, 1773.
- A decade of curious and elegant trees and plants, London: for the Author, 1773.
- Hypochondriasis: A Practical Treatise, 1776.

== Bibliography ==
- Allen, D. E. (2013). "A review article of "The Notorious Sir John Hill". Archives of Natural History. 40 (2): 363–364. doi:10.3366/anh.2013.0187.
- Dickens, Charles, ed. (26 June 1858). "Bardana Hill". Household Words. XVIII (431).
- Elliott, Brent (2011). "Hill's Vegetable Kingdom" in Eighteenth-century Science in the Garden – Occasional Papers from RHS Lindley Library, volume 5 March 2011.
- Hale, Thomas (1757). Hill, John (ed.). Eden, or, A Compleat Body of Gardening: containing plain and familiar directions for raising the several useful products of a garden, fruits, roots, and herbage, from the practice of the most successful gardeners, and the result of a long experience. London: Osborne.
- Nelson, Charles E.; Pietsch, Theodore W. (2022). "Sir John Hill (1714–1775): where was he buried?". Archives of Natural History. 49 (2): 419–422. doi:10.3366/anh.2022.0803. S2CID 253792548.
- O'Connor, Barry (2022) [2004]. "Hill, Sir John [pseud. the Inspector] (bap. 1714, d. 1775)". Oxford Dictionary of National Biography (online ed.). Oxford University Press. doi:10.1093/ref:odnb/13281. (Subscription, Wikipedia Library access or UK public library membership required.)
- George Rousseau (1981). The Letters and Private Papers of Sir John Hill (New York: AMS Press, 1981).
- George Rousseau 2012. The Notorious Sir John Hill: The Man Destroyed by Ambition in the Era of Celebrity (Lehigh University Press, Bethlehem, Pennsylvania: 2012). Pp. xxxi, 389; illustrated. ISBN 9781611461206
- The anonymous A Short Account of the Life, Writings and Character of the late Sir John Hill (1779), which is chiefly occupied with a descriptive catalogue of his works
- Temple Bar (1872, xxxv. 261–266).
