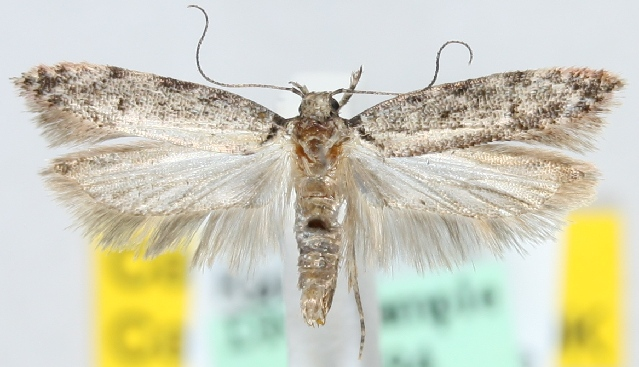

Scientific classification
- Kingdom: Animalia
- Phylum: Arthropoda
- Clade: Pancrustacea
- Class: Insecta
- Order: Lepidoptera
- Family: Gelechiidae
- Genus: Psoricoptera
- Species: P. gibbosella

Binomial name
- Psoricoptera gibbosella (Zeller, 1839)

Synonyms
- Gelechia gibbosella Zeller, 1839; Chelaria triorthias Meyrick, 1935; Lita lepigreella Lucas, 1946

= Psoricoptera gibbosella =

Species of moth

Psoricoptera gibbosella, the humped crest, is a moth of the family Gelechiidae. It is widely distributed in Europe. Outside of Europe, it is found in Turkey, North Africa, China, Japan, Korea, Siberia and the Russian Far East. The habitat consists of mature woodlands.

The wingspan is 14–20 mm. Adults are on wing from July to mid-October

The larvae feed on the leaves of Quercus, Salix, Crataegus and Malus species. They live within a spun or rolled leaf. Larvae can be found from May to June. The species overwinters as an egg.
