= Gelechia farinosa =

Scientific classification
- Kingdom: Animalia
- Phylum: Arthropoda
- Clade: Pancrustacea
- Class: Insecta
- Order: Lepidoptera
- Family: Gelechiidae
- Genus: Gelechia
- Species: G. farinosa

Binomial name
- Gelechia farinosa Teich, 1899

Species of moth

Gelechia farinosa is a moth of the family Gelechiidae first described by Karl August Teich in 1899. It is found in Lithuania.
