= Children and Sexuality =

2007 book

Children and Sexuality: From the Greeks to the Great War
- Author: George Rousseau (editor)
- Genre: Nonfiction
- Publisher: Palgrave Macmillan
- Publication date: 2007
- ISBN: 978-1137281777

Children and Sexuality: From the Greeks to the Great War is a 2007 history book edited by American historian George Rousseau. The book examines topics including pederasty, child prostitution, incest, and rape across multiple cultures in human history. It also goes through ethnographic data and studies the sexualities of Boy Scouts founder Robert Baden-Powell and Lewis Carroll.
