= Stephen Oliver (judge) =

British judge (1938–2024)

Sir Stephen Oliver KC

Acting President of the Tax Chamber of the First-tier Tribunal
- In office 1 April 2009 – 6 April 2011

Presiding Special Commissioner and President of the VAT and Duties Tribunals
- In office 1992–2009

Personal details
- Born: Stephen John Lindsay Oliver; 14 November 1938
- Died: 8 April 2024 (aged 85)
- Spouse: Dawn Oliver (m. 1967)
- Children: 3
- Education: Oriel College, Oxford
- Profession: Barrister and judge

Sir Stephen John Lindsay Oliver, KC (14 November 1938 – 8 April 2024) was a British judge.

== Background ==
Oliver was called to the bar at Middle Temple in 1963.

Oliver married the legal academic Dawn Oliver in 1967; they had three children.

He was appointed Queen's Counsel (1980), recorder (1989), and Circuit Judge (1991).

In 1992 he became the Presiding Special Commissioner and President of the VAT and Duties Tribunals. He was Knighted in the 2007 New Year Honours. On 1 April 2009 he became Acting President of the Tax Chamber of the First-tier Tribunal.

He retired on 6 April 2011, and died on 8 April 2024, at the age of 85.

== Sources ==
- OLIVER, Sir Stephen (John Lindsay), Who's Who 2012, A & C Black, 2012; online edn, Oxford University Press, Dec 2011, accessed 15 Feb 2012
