= George Rousseau =

American historian

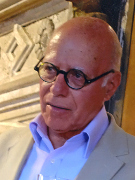
- Born: February 23, 1941 (age 85); Brooklyn, New York, U.S.
- Education: Amherst College (AB); Princeton University (PhD)
- Occupation: Emeritus Professor
- Organization: University of Aberdeen University of Oxford
- Known for: Cultural and intellectual history and literature Theories of interdisciplinarity Literature and Medicine
- Partner: John Francis Sturley (landscape gardener)

George Sebastian Rousseau (born February 23, 1941) is an American cultural historian resident in the United Kingdom.

== Early life and education ==
George Rousseau was educated at Amherst College and Princeton University, where he obtained his doctorate.

== Academic career ==
From 1966 to 1968 George Rousseau was a member of the English Faculty at Harvard University before moving to a professorship at UCLA, and later to the Regius Chair of English at Aberdeen University in Aberdeen, Scotland. He is a frequent contributor to newspapers and magazines. Since then he has been attached to the History Faculty at Oxford University in Oxford, England, where he was the Co-Director of the Centre for the History of Childhood from 2003 until his retirement in 2013. The endowed George Rousseau Lecture, delivered each year by a distinguished cultural or intellectual historian, is given annually in Magdalen College Oxford University.

Rousseau is a cultural historian who works in the interface of literature and medicine, and emphasizes the relevance of imaginative materials - literature, especially diaries and biography, art and architecture, music - for the public understanding of medicine, past and present. Rousseau was a member of the Core Team of the Norwegian Research Group in Literature and Science funded by the Norwegian Research Council. This project, funded by a SAMKUL award at the Norwegian Research Council for the period 2016-2021, applied Rousseau's theories of interdisciplinarity to concepts of late style, societies in late development, late Western Capitalism and notions of lateness at large. It endorsed the historical and contextual methodologies Rousseau had been advocating for decades in the study of literature and other disciplines. It also encouraged an interdisciplinary approach to the philosophical configurations of human ageing and the newly invigorated concept of the fourth stage of old age, feeding into contemporary ideas of what a successful old age should entail. In 2013-2018 Rousseau was a member of the Edinburgh History of Distributed Cognition project team, sponsored by the Edinburgh Centre for Epistemology, Mind and Normativity and funded by the Arts and Humanities Research Council of the United Kingdom. The Edinburgh project brought together scholars in the humanities and sciences, especially literature and philosophy, medicine and the neurosciences, and published a multi-volume history of distributed cognition from the Greeks to the present time. Rousseau's contribution was primarily in the historical era of the Enlightenment, and followed on from his decades' long commitment to interdisciplinary scholarship covering literature and the sciences, and literature and medicine especially as formulated in the current Medical Humanities. In 2010 - 2012 Rousseau was the presenter of the Wellcome Collection Event Series in London called 'Tell It To Your Doctor'.

== Honours ==
He is a Fellow of the Royal Historical Society (FRHistS). He was awarded an honorary doctorate honoris causa on 24 May 2007 by the University of Bucharest, Romania.

== Works ==
- This Long Disease My Life: Alexander Pope and the Sciences (Princeton: Princeton University Press, 1968, with Marjorie Hope Nicolson)
- English Poetic Satire (New York: Holt, Rinehart and Winston, 1969, with Neil Rudenstine) paperback ISBN 0-03-079125-1
- The Augustan Milieu: Essays Presented to Louis A. Landa (Oxford: Clarendon Press, 1970, with Eric Rothstein)
- Tobias Smollett: Bicentennial Essays Presented to Lewis M. Knapp (New York: Oxford University Press, 1971, with P. G. Boucé)
- Organic Form: The Life of an Idea (London: Routledge, 1972) ISBN 0-7100-7246-5
- Oliver Goldsmith: The Critical Heritage (London: Routledge, 1974; rev. ed. 195) paperback ISBN 0-415-13437-4
- The Ferment of Knowledge: Studies in the Historiography of Science (Cambridge: Cambridge University Press, 1980, with Roy Porter) paperback ISBN 978-0-521-08718-6
- The Letters and Private Papers of Sir John Hill (New York: AMS Press, 1981) ISBN 0-404-61472-8
- Tobias Smollett: Essays of Two Decades (Edinburgh: Edinburgh University Press, 1982) ISBN 0-567-09330-1
- Science and the Imagination: The Berkeley Conference - Metastudies of the Humanities and Social Sciences (New York: Annals of Scholarship, 1986) paperback ISSN 0192-2858
- Sexual Underworlds of the Enlightenment (Chapel Hill: The University of North Carolina Press, 1987, with Roy Porter) paper ISBN 0-7190-2440-4
- The Enduring Legacy: Alexander Pope Tercentenary Essays (Cambridge: Cambridge University Press, 1988, with Pat Rogers)
- Exoticism in the Enlightenment (Manchester: Manchester University Press, 1990, with Roy Porter)
- The Languages of Psyche: Mind and Body in Enlightenment Thought (Berkeley, Los Angeles and Oxford: University of California Press, 1991) paper ISBN 0-520-07119-0
- Perilous Enlightenment: Pre- and Post-Modern Discourses--Sexual, Historical (Manchester: Manchester University Press, 1991) ISBN 0-7190-3301-2
- Enlightenment Crossings: Pre- and Post-Modern Discourses-- Anthropological (Manchester: Manchester University Press, 1991) ISBN 0-7190-3072-2
- Enlightenment Borders: Pre- and Post-Modern Discourses--Medical, Scientific (Manchester: Manchester University Press, 1991) ISBN 0-7190-3506-6
- Medicine and the Muses (Florence, Italy: La Nuova Italia Editrice, Scandicci, 1993, translated into Italian by A. La Vergata) paperback ISBN 88-221-1232-6
- Hysteria Before Freud (Berkeley, Los Angeles and Oxford: University of California Press, 1993, with Elaine Showalter, Sander Gilman, Roy Porter, and Helen King)
- Gout: The Patrician Malady (New Haven and London: Yale University Press, 1998, with Roy Porter) paperback ISBN 0-300-08274-6
- Framing and Imagining Disease in Cultural History (Basingstoke and New York: Palgrave Macmillan, 2003, with M. Gill, D. Haycock, and M. Herwig) ISBN 1-4039-1292-0
- Marguerite Yourcenar: A Biography (London: Haus, 2004, translated into Portuguese and Romanian) ISBN 1-904341-28-4
- Nervous Acts: Essays on Literature Culture and Sensibility (Basingstoke and New York: Palgrave Macmillan, 2004) paperback ISBN 1-4039-3454-1
- Children and Sexuality: From the Greeks to the Great War (London and New York: Palgrave Macmillan, 2007) ISBN 0-230-52526-1
- The Sciences of Homosexuality in Early Modern Europe (London and New York: Routledge, 2008, with Kenneth Borris) paperback ISBN 978-0-415-40321-4
- The Notorious Sir John Hill: The Man Destroyed by Ambition in the Era of Celebrity (Bethlehem: Lehigh University Press, 2012) ISBN 978-1-61146-120-6
- The Georgia Edition of the Works of Tobias Smollett: The Adventures of Peregrine Pickle (Athens and London, GA: The University of Georgia Press, 2014) ISBN 978-0-8203-4525-3
- Rachmaninoff's Cape: a nostalgia memoir (London and New York: Virtuoso Books, 2015, translated into Russian) paperback ISBN 978-0-9931377-0-9
- Fame and Fortune: Sir John Hill and London Life in the 1750s (London and New York: Palgrave Macmillan, 2017, with Clare Brant) ISBN 978-1-137-58053-5
- History of Distributed Cognition in Enlightenment and Romantic Culture (Edinburgh: Edinburgh University Press, 2019, with Miranda Anderson and Michael Wheeler) ISBN 978-1-474-44228-2
- Light Sleep: Life from McCarthy to Covid (London: Virtuoso Books, 2022), paperback ISBN 978-0-9931377-1-6
