= Caryocolum crepusculella =

Scientific classification
- Domain: Eukaryota
- Kingdom: Animalia
- Phylum: Arthropoda
- Class: Insecta
- Order: Lepidoptera
- Family: Gelechiidae
- Genus: Caryocolum
- Species: C. crepusculella

Binomial name
- Caryocolum crepusculella (Teich, 1889)

Synonyms
- Lita crepusculella Teich, 1889

Species of moth

Caryocolum crepusculella is a moth of the family Gelechiidae. It was described by Karl August Teich from Latvia.

This species was described from two syntypes collected on 27 June and 2 July on swamp land. According to the original description, C. crepusculella is related to Caryocolum vicinella and Caryocolum fischerella. However, the real identity of this species remains obscure as the Teich collection was destroyed.
