= Dawn Oliver =

British legal scholar

Dawn Oliver KC (Hon) FBA
- Born: 7 June 1942 (age 84)
- Occupations: Legal scholar; barrister
- Spouse: Sir Stephen Oliver
- Awards: Fellow of the British Academy (2005); Queen's Counsel honoris causa (2012)

Academic background
- Education: Newnham College, Cambridge

Academic work
- Discipline: Law
- Sub-discipline: Constitutional law; administrative law
- Institutions: University College London
- Notable works: Common Values and the Public-Private Divide; Constitutional Reform in the United Kingdom; Constitutional Guardians: The House of Lords

Dawn Oliver KC (Hon) FBA (born 7 June 1942) is a British legal scholar and barrister specialising in constitutional law, administrative law and law and politics. She was Professor of Constitutional Law at University College London from 1993 to 2008 and is now Emeritus Professor.

== Early life ==
Ann Dawn Harrison Oliver was educated at Newnham College, Cambridge, where she graduated BA in 1964 and MA in 1967, and was awarded a PhD in 1993. She was awarded an LLD by the University of Cambridge in 2011.

She married Sir Stephen Oliver in 1967; he died in 2024.

== Professional career ==
She was called to the Bar by the Middle Temple in 1965 and practised at the Bar from 1965 to 1969. She was a consultant at the Legal Action Group from 1971 to 1976 before joining University College London as a lecturer in law in 1976. She became senior lecturer in 1987, reader in public law in 1990 and Professor of Constitutional Law in 1993. She served as Head of the Law Department and Dean of the Faculty of Laws from 1993 to 1998, and again as Dean in 2007.

Oliver has held a number of public and professional roles. She was a member of the Hansard Society Commission on Election Campaigns in 1990–91, the Labour and Liberal Democrats Joint Consultative Committee on Constitutional Reform in 1996–97, the Royal Commission on the Reform of the House of Lords in 1999, and the Fabian Society Commission on the Future of the Monarchy in 2002–03.

She was convenor of the UK Constitutional Law Group from 2006 to 2010 and a member of the Executive Committee of the International Association of Constitutional Law from 2007 to 2010.

She was editor of Public Law from 1993 to 2001. She was elected a Fellow of the British Academy in 2005 and appointed honorary Queen's Counsel in 2012, later becoming honorary King's Counsel.

She was elected a Bencher of the Middle Temple in 1996 and served as Treasurer in 2011.

== Selected works ==
- Jowell, Jeffrey; Oliver, Dawn, eds. (1985). The Changing Constitution. Oxford University Press.
- Oliver, Dawn (1991). Government in the United Kingdom: The Search for Accountability, Effectiveness and Citizenship. Open University Press.
- Oliver, Dawn (1999). Common Values and the Public-Private Divide. Butterworths.
- Oliver, Dawn (2003). Constitutional Reform in the United Kingdom. Oxford University Press.
- Oliver, Dawn, ed. (2009). Justice, Legality and the Rule of Law: Lessons from the Pitcairn Prosecutions. Oxford University Press.
- Oliver, Dawn; Fusaro, Carlo, eds. (2011). How Constitutions Change: A Comparative Study. Hart Publishing.
- Horne, Alexander; Drewry, Gavin; Oliver, Dawn, eds. (2013). Parliament and the Law. Hart Publishing.
- Oliver, Dawn (2015). Constitutional Guardians: The House of Lords. The Constitution Society.
