= Public Law (journal) =

Academic law journal

- Discipline: Law
- Language: English
- Edited by: Maurice Sunkin

Publication details
- History: 1956-present
- Publisher: Sweet & Maxwell (United Kingdom)
- Frequency: Quarterly

Standard abbreviations
- ISO 4: Public Law

Indexing
- ISSN: 0033-3565

Links
- Journal homepage

Public Law is an academic law journal published four times a year by Sweet & Maxwell. The journal was established in 1956 by Professor John Griffith (London School of Economics). The journal publishes articles and commentary on both British and international constitutional law, administrative law, and human rights law.

Subsequent editors include: Professor Graham Zellick (Queen Mary, University of London), Professor Anthony Bradley (University of Edinburgh), Professor Dawn Oliver (UCL), Professor Andrew Le Sueur (Queen Mary, University of London), Professor Maurice Sunkin (University of Essex), and since 2021 co-editors Professors Roger Masterman and Aileen McHarg (Durham University).
