= Great Synagogue (Sharhorod) =

1589 synagogue in Sharhorod, Ukraine

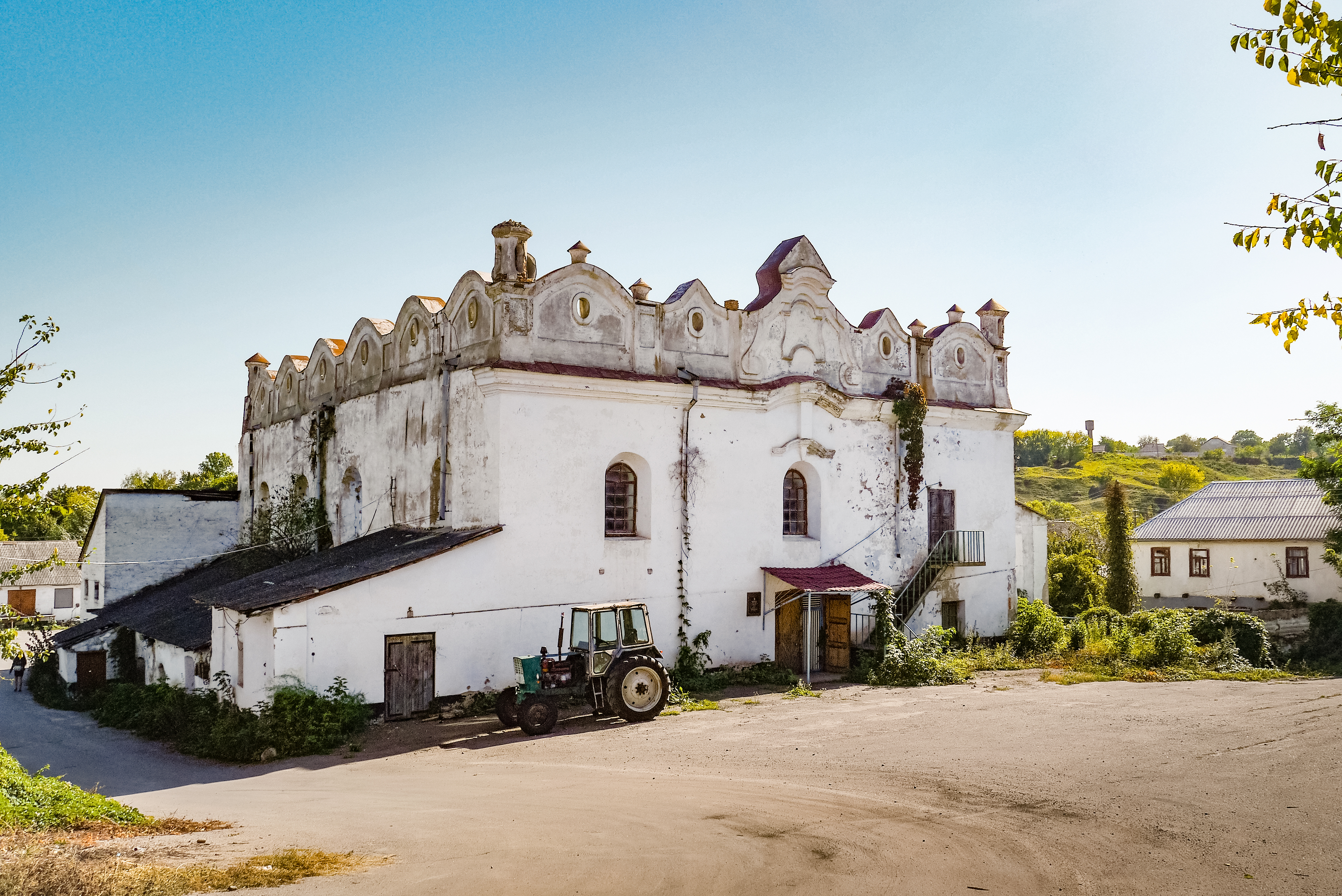
- The Great Synagogue, in 2018

- Location of the synagogue in Ukraine

Religion
- Affiliation: Judaism
- Ecclesiastical or organisational status: Synagogue (1589–1674); Mosque (1674–1699); Synagogue (1699–1930); Storage (1930–2012); Synagogue (since 2012)

Location
- Location: Sharhorod, Vinnytsia Oblast 23500
- Country: Ukraine
- Coordinates: 48°43′55″N 28°04′58″E

Architecture
- Style: Fortress synagogue
- Completed: 1589
- Immovable Monument of National Significance of Ukraine
- Official name: Синагога (Synagogue)
- Type: Architecture
- Reference no.: 020056

The Great Synagogue is a Jewish synagogue, located in Sharhorod, in the Vinnytsia Oblast of Ukraine. Built in 1589 in what was then the Polish–Lithuanian Commonwealth, it is one of the oldest synagogues in Ukraine. The building style is a fortress synagogue and it is listed in Ukraine as an Immovable Monument of National Significance.

== Architecture ==
The synagogue was built in 1589 as a fortress synagogue with walls between 1 and 2 metres (3 ft 3 in and 6 ft 7 in) thick. The 15-square-metre (160 sq ft) main hall was the prayer hall for the men. To the north is an extension which was the prayer hall for women. There are further extensions along the walls, of which the ones to the south and east are fairly modern (c. 1950). Inside the main hall are four pillars, which are decorated with ornamental stucco fragments of the 18th and 19th centuries.

== History ==
Sharhorod was occupied by the Turks between 1674 and 1699. During this time the synagogue was used as a mosque. After the Turks were driven out of the region, it was converted into a synagogue again.

From around 1930, when Ukraine (and Sharhorod) belonged to the Soviet Union, the building was used as a storehouse for beverages.

In 2012 it was returned to the small Jewish community of Sharhorod.

== See also ==
- History of the Jews in Ukraine
- List of synagogues in Ukraine
