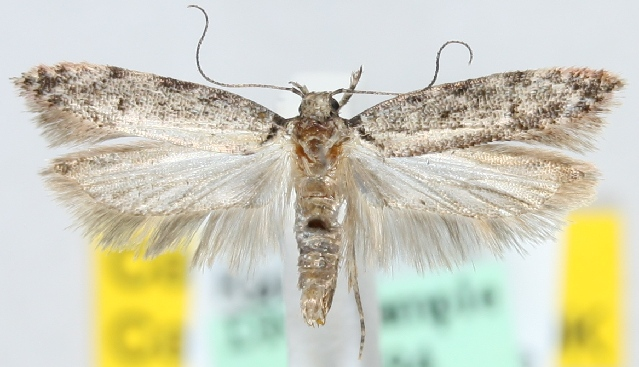
- Psoricoptera gibbosella

Scientific classification
- Kingdom: Animalia
- Phylum: Arthropoda
- Class: Insecta
- Order: Lepidoptera
- Family: Gelechiidae
- Tribe: Gelechiini
- Genus: Psoricoptera; Stainton, 1854

Synonyms
- Phoricoptera Stainton, 1854

= Psoricoptera =

Genus of moths

Psoricoptera is a genus of moths in the family Gelechiidae. The genus was erected by Henry Tibbats Stainton in 1854.

== Species ==
- Psoricoptera arenicolor Omelko, 1999
- Psoricoptera gibbosella (Zeller, 1839)
- Psoricoptera kawabei Park & Karsholt, 1999
- Psoricoptera latignathosa Park & Karsholt, 1999
- Psoricoptera speciosella Teich, 1893

== Former species ==
- Psoricoptera melanoptila Lower, 1897
