= Mikuláš Teich =

Slovak-British historian of science (1918–2018)

Mikuláš Teich (24 July 1918 – 16 August 2018) was a Slovak-British historian of science, best known for the series of histories in national context which he co-edited with Roy Porter. He was married to the economic historian Alice Teichova.

== Life ==
Mikuláš Teich was born in Kassa (Košice) on 24 July 1918, and grew up in an assimilated Jewish family. He studied medicine at Charles University, where he became politically active. After the German invasion in March 1939, he and his older brother decided to emigrate, and arrived in London in April 1939. Helped by the Montefiore family, he studied for an external university degree in chemistry at University College, Exeter. He went on to study at Leeds University, joining the Communist Party alongside Alice, who became his wife in 1944. After he gained his doctorate in 1946, they returned to Prague. However, Teich was there labelled a “destructive element” and lost his job in the chemistry department. He managed to build another career in the history of science, and was reinstated as a Party member in 1963. After the repression of the Prague Spring, he and Alice managed to escape to West Germany and on to England. There Joseph Needham found him employment at Caius College until he became a founding fellow of Robinson College, Cambridge. In the Spring of 1993, Teich held a Resident Fellowship at the Swedish Collegium for Advanced Study in Uppsala, Sweden. He remained a Fellow of Robinson until his death, aged 100, on 16 August 2018.

== Works ==
=== Books ===
- (ed. with Robert Young) Changing perspectives in the history of science: essays in honour of Joseph Needham, 1973
- (with Alica Teichova) Two essays on central European economic history, 1981
- (ed. with Roy Porter) The Enlightenment in national context, 1981
- (ed. with Roy Porter) Revolution in history, 1986
- (ed. with Roy Porter) Romanticism in national context, 1988
- (ed. with Roy Porter) Fin de siècle and its legacy, 1990
- (ed. with Roy Porter) The Renaissance in national context, 1991
- (ed, with Roy Porter) The scientific revolution in national context, 1992
- (ed. with Roy Porter) The National question in Europe in historical context, 1992
- (ed. with Dorothy M. Needham) A documentary history of biochemistry, 1770-1940, 1992
- (ed. with Roy Poter) The Reformation in national context, 1994
- (ed with Roy Porter) Sexual knowledge, sexual science : the history of attitudes to sexuality, 1994
- (ed. with Roy Porter) Drugs and narcotics in history, 1995
- (ed. with Roy Porter) The industrial revolution in national context, 1996
- (ed. with Roy Porter and Bo Gustaffson)Nature and society in national context, 1997
- (ed.) Bohemia in history, 1998
- (with Alice Teichová) Zwischen der kleinen und der grossen Welt : ein gemeinsames Leben im 20. Jahrhundert [Between the small and the large world: a common life in the 20th century], 2005
- (ed. with Dušan Kováč and Martin D Brown) Slovakia in History, 2011
- The Scientific Revolution Revisited, 2015

=== Articles ===
- 'Haldane and Lysenko revisited', Journal of the History of Biology Revisited, Vol. 40, No. 3 (Sep. 2007), pp.557-63
