= Meier Teich =

Romanian Israeli Zionist and ghetto leader

Meier Teich מאיר טייך
- Born: January 6, 1890; Suceava, Bukovina, Austria-Hungary
- Died: October 1975 (aged 84–85); Tel-Aviv, Israel
- Citizenship: Austria-Hungary Kingdom of Romania Israel
- Education: Doctor juris
- Alma mater: University of Vienna; University of Czernowitz
- Occupations: Lawyer journalist politician
- Known for: Ghetto leadership
- Political party: Jewish Party (Romania)
- Movement: Zionism

Meier Teich (Hebrew: מאיר טייך, 1890–1975) was a Bukovinian Jewish and Israeli lawyer, Zionist activist, and writer. During the Holocaust, he was the leading Jewish figure of the Sharhorod ghetto.

== Early life and career ==
Teich was born on January 6, 1890, in Suceava, which was then part of the Austro-Hungarian Empire within the Duchy of Bukovina. When he was 17 years old, he got involved in the Zionist movement, co-founding the local Poale Zion group in Bukovina.

After completing his schooling, Teich pursued his studies in law at the University of Vienna and at the University of Czernowitz. He earned his doctorate in law in 1913 and subsequently practiced law in Suceava, Vienna, and Bucharest. During the inter-war period, he became involved in the local politics of his hometown, serving as a member of the city council and later as vice-mayor. He also wrote for various Jewish newspapers and attended the World Jewish Congress in 1929. Until 1941, Teich had further been involved in various Jewish and Zionist organisations in the region.

== During the Holocaust ==
By the 1940s, Teich had established himself as a local community leader in Suceava. In 1941, Romania, aligned with Nazi Germany, initiated the deportation of its Jewish population to occupied Transnistria. Teich, along with approximately 5,000 Bukovian and Bessarabian Jews, was sent to Sharhorod. There, they were forced to dwell under desolate conditions in a ghetto alongside the 2,000 predominantly Ukrainian-speaking Jews native to the town. For his knowledge in Romanian and German languages and law, and experience as a community leader, Teich was elected chairman of a joint council representing the various communities in the ghetto on November 17, 1941, with Abraham Reicher serving as his deputy. Until the ghetto's liberation in 1944, Teich remained the leading representative of the community.

Many of the Jews in the Shargorod ghetto died of disease, 1,449 from a typhus epidemic in early 1942, or were deported to labor camps, leaving only about 2,971 deported Jews (2,731 from Bukovina and 240 from Bessarabia) alive on September 1, 1943, though about 500 Jews originally from Dorohoi were relocated to the village of Capusterna (Kopystyryn) in 1943, as a part of the relocation of 1,000 Jews to ten nearby villages. Only four Jews in Shargorod died because of typhus between October 1942 and February 1943, partly because of Meier Teich's leadership. Six Jews were executed on March 20, 1942, for leaving the ghetto without permission; Teich was not able to stop this. The local Jews fared well under Teich's leadership. The number of local Transnistrian Jews in Shargorod was originally 1,800 in round numbers in late 1941. The number was almost equally large on January 31, 1943, 1,800 in round numbers. According to a survivor of the deportations from Suceava in Bukovina, Zeef Scharf, "There were very few victims among the local Jews because the typhus was a customary thing in these areas and almost all the locals had gotten natural immunity". About 400 Jews fled to Shargorod from elsewhere, including the German-occupied area east of the Bug River, and were provided by the local Jewish committee under Teich's leadership with the necessary documents.

Teich's leadership as chairman was met with controversy, particularly due to suspicions of favoritisms towards community members from Suceava. These accusations were grave, as the Romanian authorities pressured the council to identify individuals for removal from the ghetto for forced labor, a fate often resulting in death. However, historians have viewed Teich's council as relatively impartial and successful compared to other ghetto self-administrations under Romanian or German jurisdiction. For instance, in Sharhorod, the Jewish community's leadership remained unified across national and linguistic divides, effectively providing mutual support. The self-organized Jewish police force maintained respect, enabling some degree of support for local partisan activity. According to the Yad Vashem database, the number of Jews who lived in Shargorod whose names are available, including the deportees, who died in the Holocaust was 2,652. Out of these, 124 Jews whose names are listed in the Yad Vashem database had lived in Ukraine before the war. Out of these, 93 had lived in Shargorod before the war, and some had been killed by the Germans before the arrival of the Romanians. Before the war, 2,145 of those who died during the Holocaust in Shargorod had lived in Romania before the war according to the Yad Vashem database. Out of them, 1,672 had lived in Bukovina before the war. Out of these, 673 had lived in Suceava before the war, while 566 had lived in Câmpulung Moldovenesc. Moreover, 76 had lived in Bessarabia before the war, while 301 had lived in Dorohoi and the adjacent localities. Among the latter, many who died came from smaller towns in Dorohoi County and their adjacent villages, namely Darabani (58 dead), Mihăileni (14 people), and Săveni (9 people). Shargorod was one of the minority of localities in Transnistria where most Bessarabian Jewish deportees survived the Holocaust, and Teich deserves some credit for this. Most of the Bessarabian Jews who died in Shargorod whose names are known came from Hotin.

Personally, Teich experienced the loss of his wife and both of his sons due to the harsh conditions of the ghetto.

After the liberation of the ghetto by Soviet forces on March 20, 1944, Teich and other council members faced accusations of treason and underwent trial under the Soviet occupation. Despite some incriminating testimony, Teich was acquitted, attributed to his support of partisans. The Police Inspectorate of Suceava reported that when Teich visited Suceava (he was settled in Bucharest) in July 1946, he was beaten by some members of the Suceava Jewish community for alleged abusive and inhumane treatment of some deportees to Transnistria.

== Later life and death ==
In 1950, Teich arrived in Israel and began writing for various papers, including Yediot Hadashot and Davar. Throughout the 1950s, he also made contributions to anthologies and monographs of Yad Vashem, documenting his intimate knowledge of the Jewish self-administration in Sharhorod. From 1965 until his death he was also editor of the German-language newspaper Die Stimme (קול העולה) of the Bukovian community in Israel.

Teich died in Tel Aviv in October 1975.

== See also ==
- History of the Jews in Bessarabia
- History of the Jews in Transnistria
- History of the Jews in Bukovina
- Shargorod
- Suceava
