= Roy Porter =

British historian of medicine

Roy Porter FBA
- Born: Roy Sydney Porter; 31 December 1946; South London, England
- Died: 3 March 2002 (aged 55)
- Education: Christ's College, Cambridge
- Occupation: Historian
- Spouse(s): Sue Limb; Jacqueline Rainfray; Dorothy Watkins; Hannah Augstein; Natsu Hattori

Roy Sydney Porter FBA (31 December 1946 – 3 March 2002) was a British historian known for his work on the history of medicine. He retired in 2001 as the director of the Wellcome Institute for the History of Medicine at University College London (UCL).

== Life ==
Porter grew up in South London and attended Wilson's School in Camberwell. He won a scholarship to Christ's College, Cambridge, where he studied under J. H. Plumb. His contemporaries included Simon Schama and Andrew Wheatcroft. He achieved a double starred first and became a junior Fellow in 1968, studying under Robert M. Young and lecturing on the British Enlightenment. In 1972, he moved to Churchill College as the Director of Studies in History, later becoming Dean in 1977. He received his doctorate in 1974, publishing a thesis on the history of geology as a scientific discipline. He was then appointed to the post of Assistant Lecturer in European History at Cambridge University and promoted to Lecturer in European History in 1977.

In 1979 he joined the Wellcome Institute for the History of Medicine (part of University College London) as a lecturer. In 1993 he became Professor of Social History at the institute. He briefly served as its director. In 2000, Porter published The Enlightenment: Britain and the Creation of the Modern World. He retired in September 2001, moving to St Leonards-on-Sea, where he wanted to learn to play the saxophone, cultivate his allotment and engage in some travelling. He died of a heart attack five months later, while cycling. His memorial service was on 22 April 2002 at St Pancras Parish Church.

He was married five times, firstly to Sue Limb (1970), then Jacqueline Rainfray (1983), then Dorothy Watkins (1987), then Hannah Augstein, and finally his wife at the time of his death, Natsu Hattori.

He was known for the fact that he needed very little sleep.

Roy Porter gave an annual history lecture to the boys at Wilson's School, Wallington.

== Media appearances ==
Porter made many television and radio appearances. He was an original presenter of BBC Radio 3's Night Waves, a programme on which he was scheduled to appear, discussing doctors in literature, at the point of his death.

He also spoke at a large variety of events, and was known for his oratorical talents.

== Honours ==
He was awarded the Leo Gershoy Award of the American Historical Association in 1988.

Porter was elected a fellow of the British Academy in 1994, and was made an honorary fellow of the Royal College of Physicians and the Royal College of Psychiatrists.

A plaque for the memory of Porter was unveiled by the Mayor of Lewisham in a ceremony that took place on Thursday 5 June 2008 at 13 Camplin Street, New Cross Gate, London.

== Works ==
Starting with the publishing of his PhD thesis, as The Making of Geology in 1977, Porter wrote or edited over 100 books, an academic output that was, and is, considered remarkable. The poet Michael Hofmann called him "a one-man book factory." He is particularly notable for his work in the history of medicine, in pioneering an approach that focuses on patients rather than doctors. Despite his recognition in the history of medicine, he is quoted as saying, "I'm not really a medical historian. I'm a social historian and an 18th century man". In addition to the history of medicine and other sciences, he specialised in the social history of 18th-century Britain and the Enlightenment. He also wrote and lectured on the history of London. With G. E. Berrios, Porter published A History of Clinical Psychiatry (1985) and co-edited the international journal History of Psychiatry (1989). He also edited the journal History of Science for many years.

In 2007 Roberta Bivins and John V. Pickstone edited Medicine, Madness and Social History: Essays in Honour of Roy Porter (Palgrave Macmillan). Several of the essays address Porter's work directly, and William F. Bynum appends a biographical sketch.

=== On the history of science ===
- The Making of Geology: Earth Science in Britain, 1660–1815 (Cambridge and New York, 1977; reprinted 1980) (ISBN 9780521215213)
- The Earth Sciences: An Annotated Bibliography (New York and London, 1983) (ISBN 9780824092672)
- Man Masters Nature: Twenty-Five Centuries of Science (1989) ISBN 978-0-8076-1233-0
- Porter, Roy, ed. (2003). Eighteenth-Century Science. The Cambridge History of Science. Vol. 4. Cambridge University Press. ISBN 9780521572439.

=== On the history of medicine ===
- The History of Medicine: Past, Present and Future (Uppsala, 1983)
- A Social History of Madness: Stories of the Insane (London, 1987; 1989; 1996) (ISBN 9780297792239)
- Disease, Medicine, and Society in England, 1550–1860 (London, 1987; Basingstoke, 1993; Cambridge, 1995) (ISBN 9780333398654)
- Mind-Forg'd Manacles: A History of Madness in England from the Restoration to the Regency (London, 1987; 1990) (ISBN 9780485113242)
- Health for Sale: Quackery in England, 1660–1850 (Manchester and New York, 1989) (ISBN 9780719019036)
- Doctor of Society: Thomas Beddoes and the Sick Trade in Late Enlightenment England (London, 1991)
- The Greatest Benefit to Mankind: A Medical History of Humanity (London, 1997; 1999) ISBN 978-0-393-04634-2
- Nicholas Venette: Conjugal Love (1983) ISBN 978-0-86245-107-3
- Anatomy of Madness (1985) ISBN 978-0-317-19358-9
- Disease, Medicine, and Society in England, 1550–1860 (1995) ISBN 978-0-521-55262-2
- The Cambridge Illustrated History of Medicine (1996) ISBN 978-0-521-44211-4
- A Social History of Madness: The World Through the Eyes of the Insane (1988) ISBN 978-1-55584-185-0
- Bodies Politic: Disease, Death, and Doctors in Britain, 1650–1900 (2001) ISBN 978-0-8014-3953-7
- Madness: A Brief History (2002) ISBN 978-0-19-280266-8
- Blood and Guts: A Short History of Medicine (2003) ISBN 978-0-393-03762-3
- Flesh in the Age of Reason (2004) ISBN 978-0-393-05075-2
- The Cambridge History of Medicine (2006) ISBN 978-0-521-86426-8
- Madmen: A Social History of Madhouses, Mad-Doctors and Lunatics (2006) ISBN 978-0-7524-3730-9

=== On the Enlightenment ===
- Edward Gibbon: Making History (London, 1988) (ISBN 9780297793373)
- The Enlightenment (Basingstoke, 1990; 2001)
- Enlightenment: Britain and the Creation of the Modern World (London, 2000) (ISBN 9780713991529)
  - Published in the US as The Creation of the Modern World: The Untold Story of the British Enlightenment (New York, 2000) (ISBN 9780393048728)

=== On social history ===
- English Society in the Eighteenth Century (London, 1982; Harmondsworth, 1990) (ISBN 9780140220995)
- London: A Social History (London, 1994; 1996; 2000) (ISBN 9780674538382)
- The Rise and Fall of London's Town Centres: Lessons for the Future (London, 1996) (ISBN 9781899626250)

=== History Today Articles ===
- "Under the influence": mesmerism in England (September 1985)
- The Rise and Fall of the Age of Miracles (November 1996)
- Bethlam/Bedlam: Methods of Madness? (October 1997)
- Reading is Bad for your Health (March 1998)
- Matrix of modernity – Roy Porter discusses how the British Enlightenment paved the way for the creation of the modern world (April 2001)
- The body politic: diseases and discourses – Roy Porter shows how 18th-century images of the medical profession flow over into the work of political caricaturists (October 2001)

=== Co-authored ===
- Rape, with Sylvana Tomaselli (1986) ISBN 978-0-393-04634-2
- Patient's Progress: Doctors and Doctoring in Eighteenth-Century England, with Dorothy Porter (1989) ISBN 978-0-8047-1744-1
- The Facts of Life: The Creation of Sexual Knowledge in Britain, 1650–1950, with Lesley A. Hall (1995) ISBN 978-0-300-06221-2
- Gout: The Patrician Malady, with G S Rousseau (1998) ISBN 978-0-300-07386-7

=== As editor ===
- The Ferment of Knowledge: Studies in the Historiography of Eighteenth-Century Science, with G S Rousseau (1980) ISBN 978-0-521-22599-1
- Dictionary of the History of Science, with W F Bynum and E J Browne (1981) ISBN 978-0-691-08287-5
- The Enlightenment in National Context, with Mikulás̆ Teich (1981) ISBN 978-0-521-23757-4
  - Contributed essay, 'The Enlightenment in England'
- The Anatomy of Madness: Essays in the History of Psychiatry, 3 volumes, with W F Bynum and Michael Shepherd (1985) ISBN 978-0-422-79430-5
  - Volume I: People and Ideas – contributed essay 'The Hunger of Imagination: approaching Samuel Johnson's melancholy'
- Revolution in History, with Mikulás̆ Teich (1986) ISBN 978-0-521-25978-1
  - Contributed essay, 'The scientific revolution: a spoke in the wheel?'
- Problems and Methods in the History of Medicine, with Andrew Wear (1987) ISBN 978-0-7099-3687-9
- The Social History of Language, with Peter Burke (1987) ISBN 978-0-521-30158-9
- Drugs and Narcotics in History, with Mikulás̆ Teich (1988) ISBN 978-0-521-43163-7
- Romanticism in National Context, with Mikulás̆ Teich (1988) ISBN 978-0-521-32605-6
- Sexual Underworlds of the Enlightenment, with G S Rousseau (1988) ISBN 978-0-8078-1782-7
- The Dialectics of Friendship, with Sylvana Tomaselli (1989) ISBN 978-0-415-01751-0
- The Hospital in History, with Lindsay Patricia Granshaw (1989) ISBN 978-0-415-00375-9
- Exoticism in the Enlightenment, with G S Rousseau (1989) ISBN 978-0-7190-2677-5
- Fin de Siècle and its Legacy, with Mikulás̆ Teich (1990) ISBN 978-0-521-34108-0
- The Popularization of Medicine, 1650–1850 (1992) ISBN 978-0-415-07217-5
- The Renaissance in National Context, with Mikulás̆ Teich (1992) ISBN 978-0-521-36181-1
- The Scientific Revolution in National Context, with Mikulás̆ Teich (1992) ISBN 978-0-521-39510-6
- Consumption and the World of Goods, with John Brewer (1993) ISBN 978-0-415-03712-9
- Companion Encyclopedia of the History of Medicine, with W F Bynum (1993) ISBN 978-0-415-04771-5
- A Dictionary of Eighteenth-Century World History, with Jeremy Black (1994) ISBN 978-0-631-18068-5
- The Biographical History of Scientists (1994) ISBN 978-0-19-521083-5
- Sexual Knowledge, Sexual Science: The History of Attitudes to Sexuality, with Mikulás̆ Teich (1994) ISBN 978-0-521-44434-7
- Inventing Human Science: Eighteenth-Century Domains, with Christopher Fox and Robert Wokler (1995) ISBN 978-0-520-20010-4
- Languages and Jargons: Contributions Towards the Social History of Language, with Peter Burke (1995) ISBN 978-0-7456-1279-9
- Pleasure in the Eighteenth Century, with Marie Mulvey Roberts (1996) ISBN 978-0-8147-6644-6
- Nature and Society in Historical Context, with Mikulás̆ Teich and Bo Gustafsson (1997) ISBN 978-0-521-49530-1
- From Physico-Theology to Bio-Technology: Essays in the Social and Cultural History of Biosciences, with Kurt Bayertz (1998)ISBN 978-9042005013
  - Also contributed essay 'Gout and quackery; or, banks and mountebanks'
- Toleration in Enlightenment Europe, with Ole Peter Grell (2000) ISBN 978-0-521-65196-7
- The Confinement of the Insane: International Perspectives, 1800–1965, with David Wright (2003) ISBN 978-0-521-80206-2
- Oxford Dictionary of Scientific Quotations, with W F Bynum (2005) ISBN 978-0-19-858409-4

=== Books about Roy Porter ===
- Remembering Roy Porter (2002, The Wellcome Trust)
- Medicine, Madness and Social History: Essays in Honour of Roy Porter (2007) ISBN 9780230525498
