= Dušan Kováč =

Slovak historian and writer (born 1942)

PhDr. Dušan Kováč DrSc.
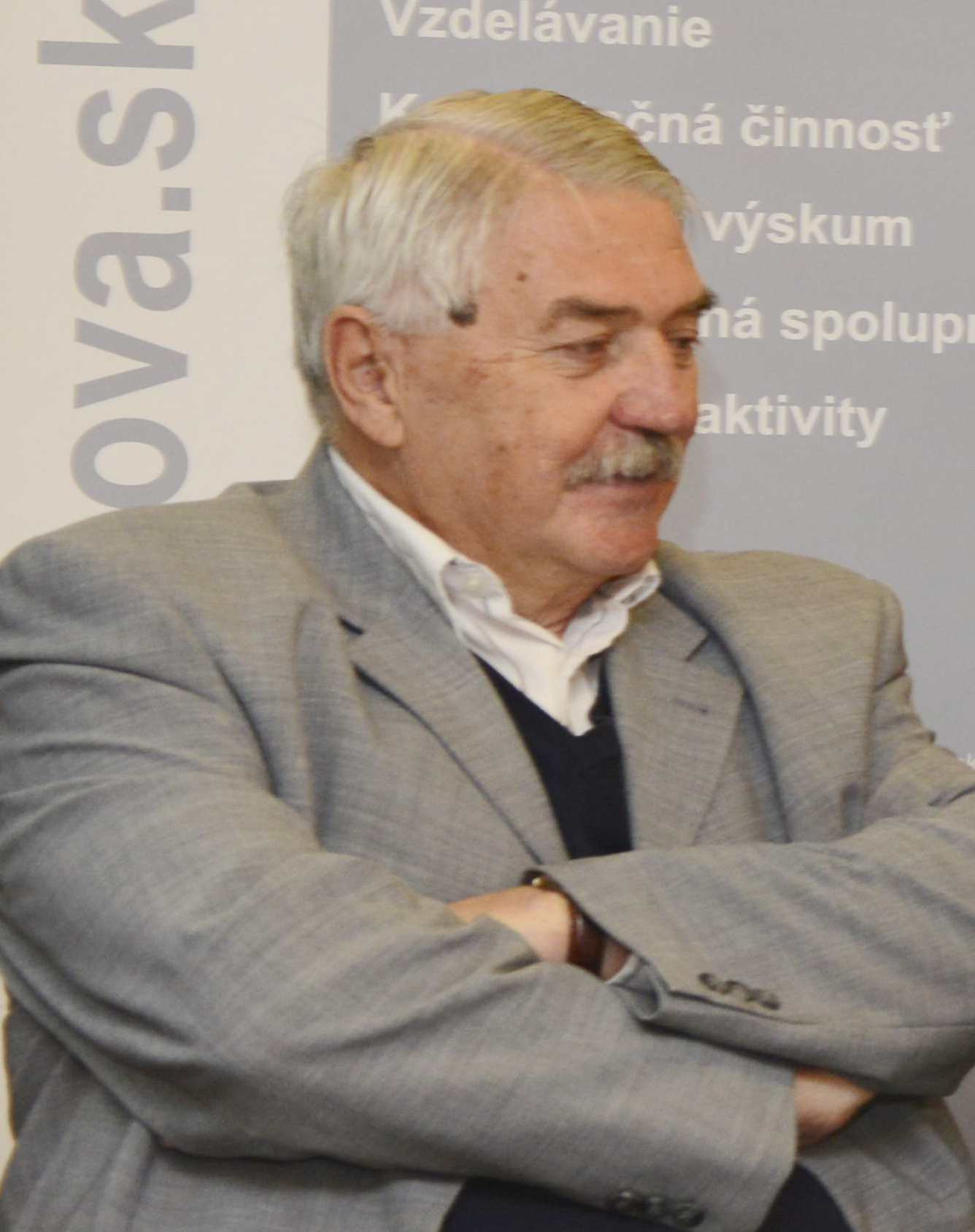
- Born: 3 January 1942 (age 84); Humenné, Slovak state

Academic work
- Discipline: History

Dušan Kováč (born 3 January 1942) is a Slovak historian and writer. He specializes in Slovak and Central European history of the 19th and 20th centuries, the author or co-author of several synthetic works about Slovak history. The head of the Institute of History of the Slovak Academy of Sciences (1990-1998), the scientific secretary of the Presidium of the Slovak Academy of Sciences (since 1998). The member of several Slovak and foreign scientific organisations like the Collegium Carolinum in Munich or the Royal Historical Society in London. He is a brother of the Slovak ex-president Michal Kováč.

== Selected works ==
- 1979 Od Dvojspolku k anšlusu [From the Double Alliance to the Anschluss]
- 1991 Nemecko a nemecká menšina na Slovensku 1871-1945 [Germany and the German Minority in Slovakia 1871-1945]
- 1992 Slovenské dejiny [Slovak History] (co-author)
- 1992 History and Politics
- 1995 Slovensko v Rakúsko-Uhorsku [Slovakia in Austria-Hungary]
- 1997 Slováci. Česi. Dejiny [The Slovaks. The Czechs. History]
- 1998 Dejiny Slovenska [History of Slovakia]
- 1998 Kronika Slovenska 1 [Chronicle of Slovakia 1] (co-author)
- 1999 Kronika Slovenska 2 [Chronicle of Slovakia 2] (co-author)

== Awards ==
- Pribina Cross, II. class (President of the Slovak Republic)
