= Alice Teichova =

Austrian-British economist (1920–2015)

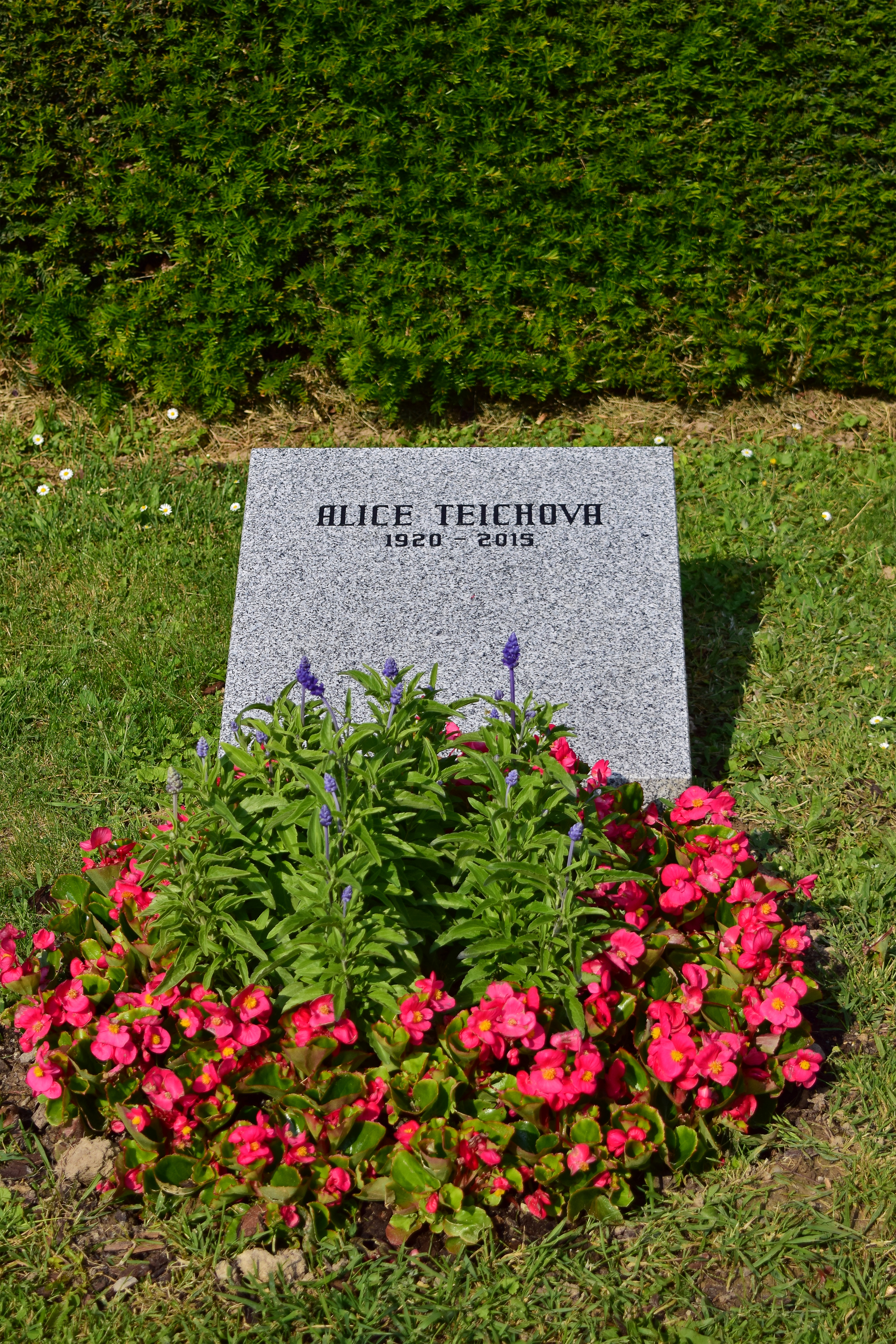
Gravestone of Alice Teichova in Wiener Zentralfriedhof

Alice Teichova (née Schwarz; 19 September 1920 – 12 March 2015) was an Austrian-born British economist and economic historian. She was considered one of the leading economic historians of modern Central Europe. Her publications included a landmark survey of the international business relations of Czechoslovakia, An Economic Background to Munich, published in 1974. She co-authored her most recent work, Nation, State and the Economy in History (2003), with the Austrian economist historian, Herbert Matis.

Teichova was born into a Jewish family in Vienna on 19 September 1920 to Arthur Schwarz, a watchmaker, and Gisela (née Leist). She was raised in a single room residence in the Floridsdorf district of Vienna, where her father owned a watch shop. The family fled Austria in the late 1930s following the rise of the Nazis and the Anschluss in 1938. Alice, who had obtained a job as a maid in Kingston-upon-Thames, Surrey, England, was the first to flee the country. The rest of the family later joined her in the United Kingdom. She met her husband, Mikulás Teich, who became a leading Slovak historian, at a refugee club in the UK in 1940.

Teichova became the first female professor at the University of East Anglia. In 1985, Teichova received an honorary doctorate from Uppsala University, Sweden. In the Spring of 1990, she held a Resident Fellowship at the Swedish Collegium for Advanced Study in Uppsala.

Alice Teichova died on 12 March 2015, at the age of 94.
