= Karl August Teich =

German entomologist

Karl, or Carl, August Teich (1838 Harthau-Chemnitz - 1908 Riga) was a German entomologist who specialised in Lepidoptera especially of the Baltic region. He described Caryocolum crepusculella, Gelechia bergiella and Gelechia farinosa among others. Fragments of his microlepidoptera collections are held by the Latvian Museum of Natural History. The bulk did not survive.

== Works ==
Partial list

- Teich, C.A., 1881 Lepidopterologische Bemerkungen Entomologische Zeitung (Stettin) 42: 187-189
- Teich, 1886 Lepidopterologisches aus Livland Stettiner Entomologische Zeitung 47 : 168-171
- Teich, C. A., 1889 Baltische Lepidopteren-Fauna. I-IX, 1-152. Riga.
- Teich, C. A., 1908 Lepidopterologische Notizen. KorrespBl. NaturfVer. Riga 51: 37-40.
