= Xystophora =

Scientific classification
- Kingdom: Animalia
- Phylum: Arthropoda
- Clade: Pancrustacea
- Class: Insecta
- Order: Lepidoptera
- Family: Gelechiidae
- Tribe: Gelechiini
- Genus: Xystophora; Wocke, 1876

Synonyms
- Doryphora Heinemann, 1870; Doryphorella Cockerell, 1888

Genus of moths

Xystophora is a genus of moths in the family Gelechiidae.

== Species ==
- Xystophora asthenodes (Meyrick, 1923)
- Xystophora carchariella (Zeller, 1839)
- Xystophora chengchengenis Li & Zheng, 1998
- Xystophora defixa (Meyrick, 1929)
- Xystophora ingentidentalis Li & Zheng, 1998
- Xystophora kostjuki Bidzilya, 2000
- Xystophora mongolica Emelyanov & Piskunov, 1982
- Xystophora novipsammitella Li & Zheng, 1998
- Xystophora parvisaccula Li & Zheng, 1998
- Xystophora psammitella (Snellen, 1884)
- Xystophora pulveratella (Herrich-Schaffer, 1854)

== Selected former species ==
- Xystophora rufulella Snellen, 1884
