= Monochroa nomadella =

Scientific classification
- Kingdom: Animalia
- Phylum: Arthropoda
- Clade: Pancrustacea
- Class: Insecta
- Order: Lepidoptera
- Family: Gelechiidae
- Genus: Monochroa
- Species: M. nomadella

Binomial name
- Monochroa nomadella (Zeller, 1868)

Synonyms
- Gelechia nomadella Frey, 1868

Species of moth

Monochroa nomadella is a moth of the family Gelechiidae. It is found from southern and central Europe to the southern Ural. It is also found in Mongolia. Records of M. nomadella from France and north-western Italy refer to Monochroa bronzella. The species prefers calcareous habitats.

The wingspan is 12–14 mm for males and about 8 mm for females.
