= Monochroa leptocrossa =

Scientific classification
- Kingdom: Animalia
- Phylum: Arthropoda
- Class: Insecta
- Order: Lepidoptera
- Family: Gelechiidae
- Genus: Monochroa
- Species: M. leptocrossa

Binomial name
- Monochroa leptocrossa (Meyrick, 1926)

Synonyms
- Aristotelia leptocrossa Meyrick, 1926

Species of moth

Monochroa leptocrossa is a moth of the family Gelechiidae. It was described by Edward Meyrick in 1926. It is found on the Japanese island of Hokkaido and in the Russian Far East. This species has been introduced to New Zealand. Lepidoptera and Some Other Life Forms gives this name as a synonym of Monochroa hornigi.

The wingspan is 8.9-10.7 mm. The forewings are grey speckled with whitish and sprinkled with dark grey. The plical and second discal stigmata are small, black and distinct. There is a cloudy white dot on the costa at two-thirds, and one on the tornus slightly before it. The hindwings are grey slightly bluish tinged.
