= Monochroa rutilella =

Scientific classification
- Kingdom: Animalia
- Phylum: Arthropoda
- Class: Insecta
- Order: Lepidoptera
- Family: Gelechiidae
- Genus: Monochroa
- Species: M. rutilella

Binomial name
- Monochroa rutilella (Snellen, 1884)

Synonyms
- Xystophora rutilella Snellen, 1884

Species of moth

Monochroa rutilella is a moth of the family Gelechiidae. It was described by Snellen in 1884. It is found in Russia (Amur region).

The wingspan is 9.5–10 mm. The forewings are dark violet at the base with a green-silvery diagonal band from one-sixth to the fold. The remainder are shining coppery with two purple-silvery dots, one at two-thirds of the fold and the other halfway in the cell. The last one-third, at the tip, is red-coppery with a violet glow which intensifies towards the tip. The hindwings are blackish-grey with a coppery tinge.
