= Xystophora parvisaccula =

Scientific classification
- Domain: Eukaryota
- Kingdom: Animalia
- Phylum: Arthropoda
- Class: Insecta
- Order: Lepidoptera
- Family: Gelechiidae
- Genus: Xystophora
- Species: X. parvisaccula

Binomial name
- Xystophora parvisaccula H.-H. Li & Z.-M. Zheng, 1998

Species of moth

Xystophora parvisaccula is a moth of the family Gelechiidae. It was described by Hou-Hun Li and Zhe-Min Zheng in 1998. It is found in Shaanxi, China.
