= Monochroa harrisonella =

Scientific classification
- Domain: Eukaryota
- Kingdom: Animalia
- Phylum: Arthropoda
- Class: Insecta
- Order: Lepidoptera
- Family: Gelechiidae
- Genus: Monochroa
- Species: M. harrisonella

Binomial name
- Monochroa harrisonella (Busck, 1904)

Synonyms
- Aristotelia harrisonella Busck, 1904

Species of moth

Monochroa harrisonella is a moth of the family Gelechiidae. It was described by August Busck in 1904. It is found in North America, where it has been recorded from California, Washington, British Columbia and Florida.

The wingspan is about 16 mm. The forewings are dirty whitish, overlaid with light ochreous. On the middle of the fold is a prominent short black streak, and at the end of the cell is a deep black round spot. Around the apical edge is a not very conspicuous dark line before the cilia. The hindwings are light yellowish fuscous.
