= Monochroa gracilella =

Scientific classification
- Domain: Eukaryota
- Kingdom: Animalia
- Phylum: Arthropoda
- Class: Insecta
- Order: Lepidoptera
- Family: Gelechiidae
- Genus: Monochroa
- Species: M. gracilella

Binomial name
- Monochroa gracilella (Chrétien, 1908)

Synonyms
- Apodia gracilella Chrétien, 1908

Species of moth

Monochroa gracilella is a moth of the family Gelechiidae. It was described by Pierre Chrétien in 1908. It is found in Algeria.

The wingspan is 9–10.5 mm. The forewings are white with brown or black scales. The hindwings are whitish.
