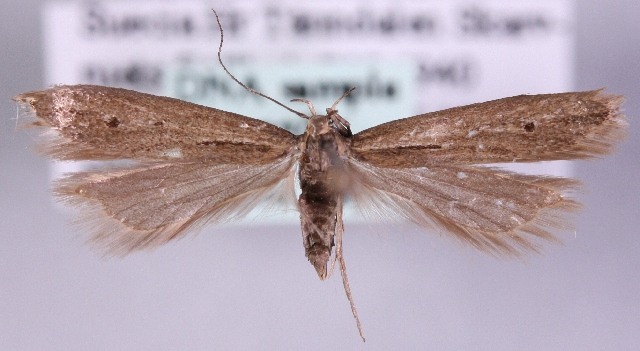

Scientific classification
- Domain: Eukaryota
- Kingdom: Animalia
- Phylum: Arthropoda
- Class: Insecta
- Order: Lepidoptera
- Family: Gelechiidae
- Genus: Monochroa
- Species: M. saltenella

Binomial name
- Monochroa saltenella (Benander, 1928)

Synonyms
- Xystophora saltenella Benander, 1928

= Monochroa saltenella =

Species of moth

Monochroa saltenella is a moth of the family Gelechiidae. It was described by Benander in 1928. It is found in Norway, Sweden, Finland and northern Russia.

The wingspan is 11–17 mm.

The larvae feed on Rumex acetosa.
