= Monochroa pullusella =

Scientific classification
- Kingdom: Animalia
- Phylum: Arthropoda
- Clade: Pancrustacea
- Class: Insecta
- Order: Lepidoptera
- Family: Gelechiidae
- Genus: Monochroa
- Species: M. pullusella

Binomial name
- Monochroa pullusella (Chambers, 1874)

Synonyms
- Gelechia pullusella Chambers, 1874; Aristotelia pullusella; Gelechia minimella Chambers, 1874; Aristotelia pullella Meyrick, 1925

Species of moth

Monochroa pullusella is a moth of the family Gelechiidae. It was described by Vactor Tousey Chambers in 1874. It is found in North America, where it has been recorded from Illinois, Maine, New Hampshire, New Jersey, Oklahoma and Texas.

Adults are brown, microscopically sprinkled obscurely with whitish scales.
