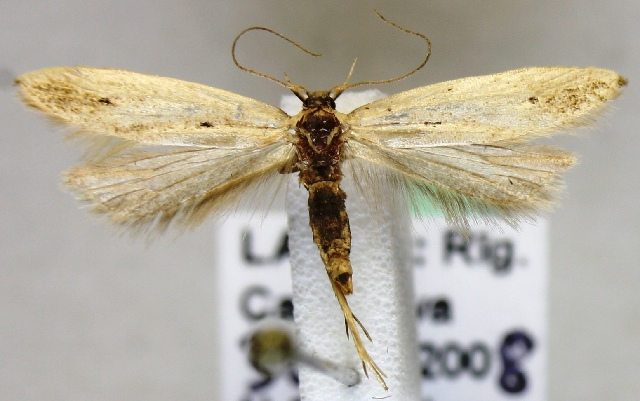

Scientific classification
- Domain: Eukaryota
- Kingdom: Animalia
- Phylum: Arthropoda
- Class: Insecta
- Order: Lepidoptera
- Family: Gelechiidae
- Genus: Monochroa
- Species: M. divisella

Binomial name
- Monochroa divisella (Douglas, 1850)

Synonyms
- Gelechia divisella Douglas, 1850; Xystophora divisella; Catabrachmia csornensis Rebel, 1909; Aristotelia (Xystophora) lepidolampra Gozmány, 1952; Monochroa zarichella Piskunov, 1975

= Monochroa divisella =

Species of moth

Monochroa divisella, the scarce marsh neb, is a moth of the family Gelechiidae. It is found in Denmark, Latvia, Germany, the Netherlands, Belgium, Great Britain, the Czech Republic, Hungary, Bulgaria and France. Outside of Europe, it is known from Korea, the Russian Far East and Japan.

The wingspan is 15–16 mm. The forewings are two-tone ochreous with two distinct black spots. Adults are on wing in June and July.

The larvae feed on Iris pseudacorus. They mine the leaves of their host plant. Pupation takes place outside of the mine.
