= Monochroa pentameris =

Scientific classification
- Kingdom: Animalia
- Phylum: Arthropoda
- Class: Insecta
- Order: Lepidoptera
- Family: Gelechiidae
- Genus: Monochroa
- Species: M. pentameris

Binomial name
- Monochroa pentameris (Meyrick, 1931)

Synonyms
- Aristotelia pentameris Meyrick, 1931

Species of moth

Monochroa pentameris is a moth of the family Gelechiidae. It was described by Edward Meyrick in 1931. It is found on Honshu in Japan and Guangxi in China.

The wingspan is 8–9 mm.
