= Xystophora psammitella =

Scientific classification
- Kingdom: Animalia
- Phylum: Arthropoda
- Class: Insecta
- Order: Lepidoptera
- Family: Gelechiidae
- Genus: Xystophora
- Species: X. psammitella

Binomial name
- Xystophora psammitella (Snellen, 1884)

Synonyms
- Gelechia psammitella Snellen, 1884

Species of moth

Xystophora psammitella is a moth of the family Gelechiidae. It was described by Snellen in 1884. It is found in the Russian Far East, Korea, China (Shaanxi) and Japan.

The wingspan is 11–12 mm.
