= Monochroa suffusella =

Scientific classification
- Domain: Eukaryota
- Kingdom: Animalia
- Phylum: Arthropoda
- Class: Insecta
- Order: Lepidoptera
- Family: Gelechiidae
- Genus: Monochroa
- Species: M. suffusella

Binomial name
- Monochroa suffusella (Douglas, 1850)

Synonyms
- Gelechia suffusella Douglas, 1850; Gelechia oblitella Doubleday, 1859; Bryotropha peterseni Teich, 1901

Species of moth

Monochroa suffusella, the notch wing neb, is a moth of the family Gelechiidae. It is found from Fennoscandia to the Pyrenees and Alps and from Ireland to Romania. In the east, the range extends to Japan. The habitat consists of bogs, fens, swamps and salt-marshes.

The wingspan is 10–12 mm. Head whitish. Forewings whitish-ochreous, posteriorly irrorated with brown, costal edge whitish; second discal stigma dark fuscous; a black costal dot above it. Hindwings pale grey.

Adults have been recorded on wing from June to July.

The larvae feed on Eriophorum angustifolium. They mine the leaves of their host plant.
