= Monochroa parvulata =

Scientific classification
- Kingdom: Animalia
- Phylum: Arthropoda
- Clade: Pancrustacea
- Class: Insecta
- Order: Lepidoptera
- Family: Gelechiidae
- Genus: Monochroa
- Species: M. parvulata

Binomial name
- Monochroa parvulata (Gozmány, 1957)

Synonyms
- Xystophora parvulata Gozmány, 1957; Monochroa mediterranea Nel & Luquet, 1997

Species of moth

Monochroa parvulata is a moth of the family Gelechiidae. It is found from southern and central Europe to Estonia in the north and the southern Ural in the east.
