= Monochroa discriminata =

Scientific classification
- Kingdom: Animalia
- Phylum: Arthropoda
- Class: Insecta
- Order: Lepidoptera
- Family: Gelechiidae
- Genus: Monochroa
- Species: M. discriminata

Binomial name
- Monochroa discriminata (Meyrick, 1923)

Synonyms
- Aristotelia discriminata Meyrick, 1923

Species of moth

Monochroa discriminata is a moth of the family Gelechiidae. It was described by Edward Meyrick in 1923. It is found in North America, where it has been recorded from southern Ontario.

The wingspan is 12–13 mm. The forewings are grey. The stigmata are cloudy, blackish and often obscure, the plical obliquely before the first discal, sometimes a faint oblique shade of blackish irroration (sprinkles) from near the costa at one-third to the first discal. There is an obscure whitish dot on the costa at two-thirds, preceded by slight darker suffusion, sometimes obsolete. The hindwings are grey.
