= Monochroa chromophanes =

Scientific classification
- Kingdom: Animalia
- Phylum: Arthropoda
- Class: Insecta
- Order: Lepidoptera
- Family: Gelechiidae
- Genus: Monochroa
- Species: M. chromophanes

Binomial name
- Monochroa chromophanes (Meyrick, 1938)

Synonyms
- Aristotelia chromophanes Meyrick, 1938

Species of moth

Monochroa chromophanes is a moth of the family Gelechiidae. It was described by Edward Meyrick in 1938. It is found in Yunnan, China.
