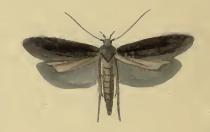

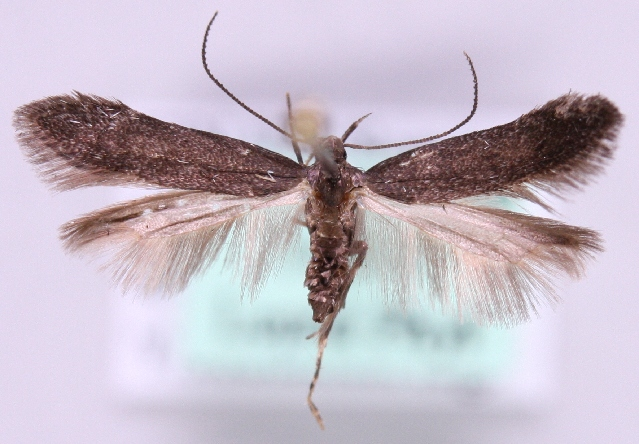

Scientific classification
- Kingdom: Animalia
- Phylum: Arthropoda
- Clade: Pancrustacea
- Class: Insecta
- Order: Lepidoptera
- Family: Gelechiidae
- Genus: Monochroa
- Species: M. servella

Binomial name
- Monochroa servella (Zeller, 1839)

Synonyms
- Gelechia servella Zeller, 1839; Gelechia farinosae Stainton, 1867; Xystophora farinosae; Monochroa farinosae

= Monochroa servella =

Species of moth

Monochroa servella is a moth of the family Gelechiidae. It is found from Fennoscandia to Italy and from Portugal to Bulgaria and Russia.

The wingspan is 11–13 mm. Adults are on wing in June.

The larvae feed on Primula farinosa and Primula veris. They mine the leaves of their host plant. Larvae can be found in May.

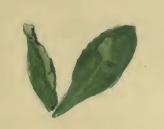
A discoloured leaf of Primula farinosa

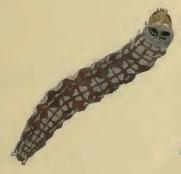
Larva
