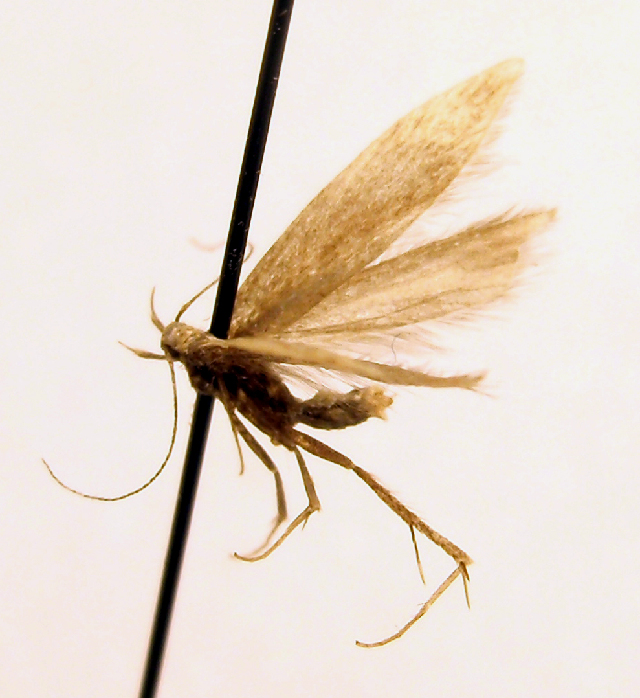

Scientific classification
- Kingdom: Animalia
- Phylum: Arthropoda
- Clade: Pancrustacea
- Class: Insecta
- Order: Lepidoptera
- Family: Gelechiidae
- Genus: Monochroa
- Species: M. simplicella

Binomial name
- Monochroa simplicella (Lienig & Zeller, 1846)

Synonyms
- Gelechia simplicella Lienig & Zeller, 1846; Paltodora impella Piskunov, 1975

= Monochroa simplicella =

Species of moth

Monochroa simplicella is a moth of the family Gelechiidae. It is found in Russia (the southern Ural and the central part of European Russia), Belarus, Slovakia, Germany, Italy, Hungary, Finland and the Baltic region. Outside of Europe, it is found in the Altai and in Irkutskaya oblast.
