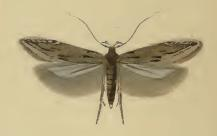

Scientific classification
- Kingdom: Animalia
- Phylum: Arthropoda
- Clade: Pancrustacea
- Class: Insecta
- Order: Lepidoptera
- Family: Gelechiidae
- Genus: Monochroa
- Species: M. arundinetella

Binomial name
- Monochroa arundinetella (Stainton, 1858)

Synonyms
- Gelechia arundinetella Stainton, 1858; Gelechia arundinetella Boyd, 1857

= Monochroa arundinetella =

Species of moth

Monochroa arundinetella is a moth of the family Gelechiidae. It is found from Fennoscandia to the Pyrenees, Alps and Hungary and from Great Britain to Ukraine.

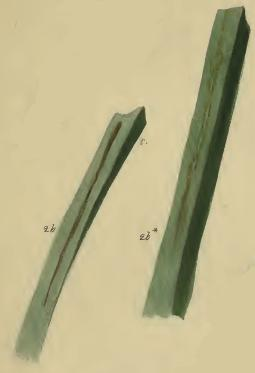
Mined leaves of Carex riparia

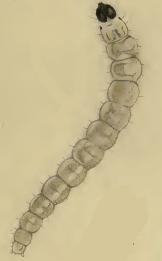
Larva

The wingspan is 10–12 mm.

The larvae feed on Carex acutiformis, Carex riparia and Carex rostrata. They mine the leaves of their host plant. Larvae can be found from March to May.

== Taxonomy ==
Some sources list Boyd as the author of the species, claiming it was described by him in 1857.
