= Monochroa cleodoroides =

Scientific classification
- Domain: Eukaryota
- Kingdom: Animalia
- Phylum: Arthropoda
- Class: Insecta
- Order: Lepidoptera
- Family: Gelechiidae
- Genus: Monochroa
- Species: M. cleodoroides

Binomial name
- Monochroa cleodoroides Sakamaki, 1994

Species of moth

Monochroa cleodoroides is a moth of the family Gelechiidae. It was described by Sakamaki in 1994. It is found in Japan (Honshu, Kyushu) and Korea.
