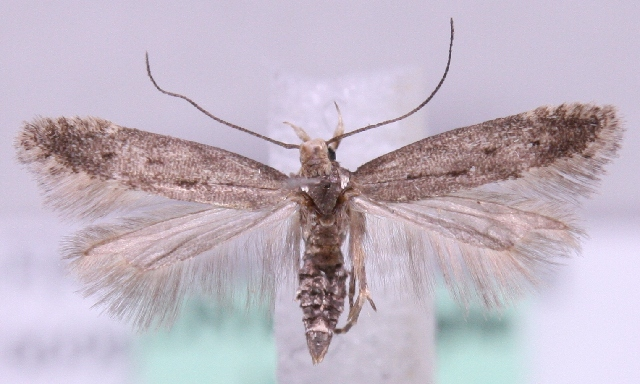

Scientific classification
- Kingdom: Animalia
- Phylum: Arthropoda
- Clade: Pancrustacea
- Class: Insecta
- Order: Lepidoptera
- Family: Gelechiidae
- Genus: Monochroa
- Species: M. tetragonella

Binomial name
- Monochroa tetragonella (Stainton, 1885)

Synonyms
- Gelechia tetragonella Stainton, 1885; Xystophora gudmanni Larsen, 1927; Aristotelia gudmanni; Monochroa gudmanni

= Monochroa tetragonella =

Species of moth

Monochroa tetragonella, the saltern neb, is a moth of the family Gelechiidae. It is found in Scandinavia, the Baltic region, Great Britain, the Netherlands and Russia (including the Altai and Transbaikalia). The habitat consists of saltmarshes.

The wingspan is 9–11 mm. Adults are on wing from June to July.

Larvae feed on sea milkwort (Lysimachia maritima), mining the leaves.
