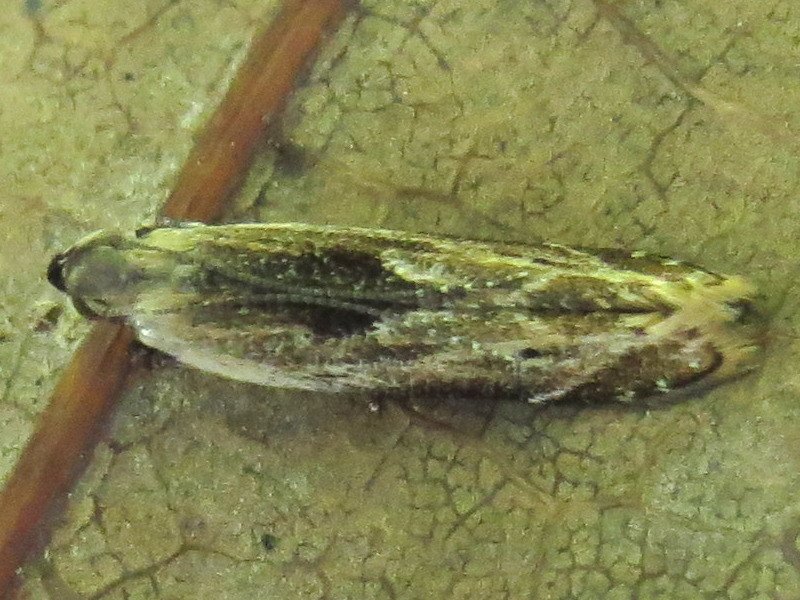

Scientific classification
- Kingdom: Animalia
- Phylum: Arthropoda
- Clade: Pancrustacea
- Class: Insecta
- Order: Lepidoptera
- Family: Gelechiidae
- Genus: Monochroa
- Species: M. gilvolinella

Binomial name
- Monochroa gilvolinella (Clemens, 1863)

Synonyms
- Gelechia gilvolinella Clemens, 1863

= Monochroa gilvolinella =

Species of moth

Monochroa gilvolinella is a moth of the family Gelechiidae. It was described by James Brackenridge Clemens in 1863. It is found in North America, where it has been recorded from Illinois, Indiana, Mississippi, New Hampshire and Pennsylvania.

The wingspan is about 10 mm. The forewings are pale yellowish, dusted with dark fuscous, especially towards the tip and along the costa from the middle to the tip. Near the tip is an oblique, pale yellowish line from the costa, extended to a spot of the same hue beneath the tip. Behind this line in the middle of the wing is a blackish-brown dot. Between the costal end of the line and the tip of the wing are two or three small pale yellowish costal dots, and a few on the margin beneath the tip, sometimes indistinct. The hindwings are fuscous.
