= Xystophora carchariella =

Scientific classification
- Kingdom: Animalia
- Phylum: Arthropoda
- Clade: Pancrustacea
- Class: Insecta
- Order: Lepidoptera
- Family: Gelechiidae
- Genus: Xystophora
- Species: X. carchariella

Binomial name
- Xystophora carchariella (Zeller, 1839)

Synonyms
- Gelechia carchariella Zeller, 1839

Species of moth

Xystophora carchariella is a moth of the family Gelechiidae. It is found from southern and central Europe to the Ural Mountains, Sweden and the Baltic States. Outside of Europe, it is also found in Turkey, China and the Russian Far East.

The wingspan is 11–12 mm. Adults have been recorded on wing in June and July.

The larvae have been found on Kashubian vetch (Vicia cassubica) and Vicia pisiformis.
