= Monochroa uralensis =

Scientific classification
- Kingdom: Animalia
- Phylum: Arthropoda
- Clade: Pancrustacea
- Class: Insecta
- Order: Lepidoptera
- Family: Gelechiidae
- Genus: Monochroa
- Species: M. uralensis

Binomial name
- Monochroa uralensis Junnilainen, 2010

Species of moth

Monochroa uralensis is a moth of the family Gelechiidae. It is found in Russia (the southern Ural). The habitat consists of dry steppes close to moist meadows.

The wingspan is about 19 mm. Adults are on wing in mid-June.
