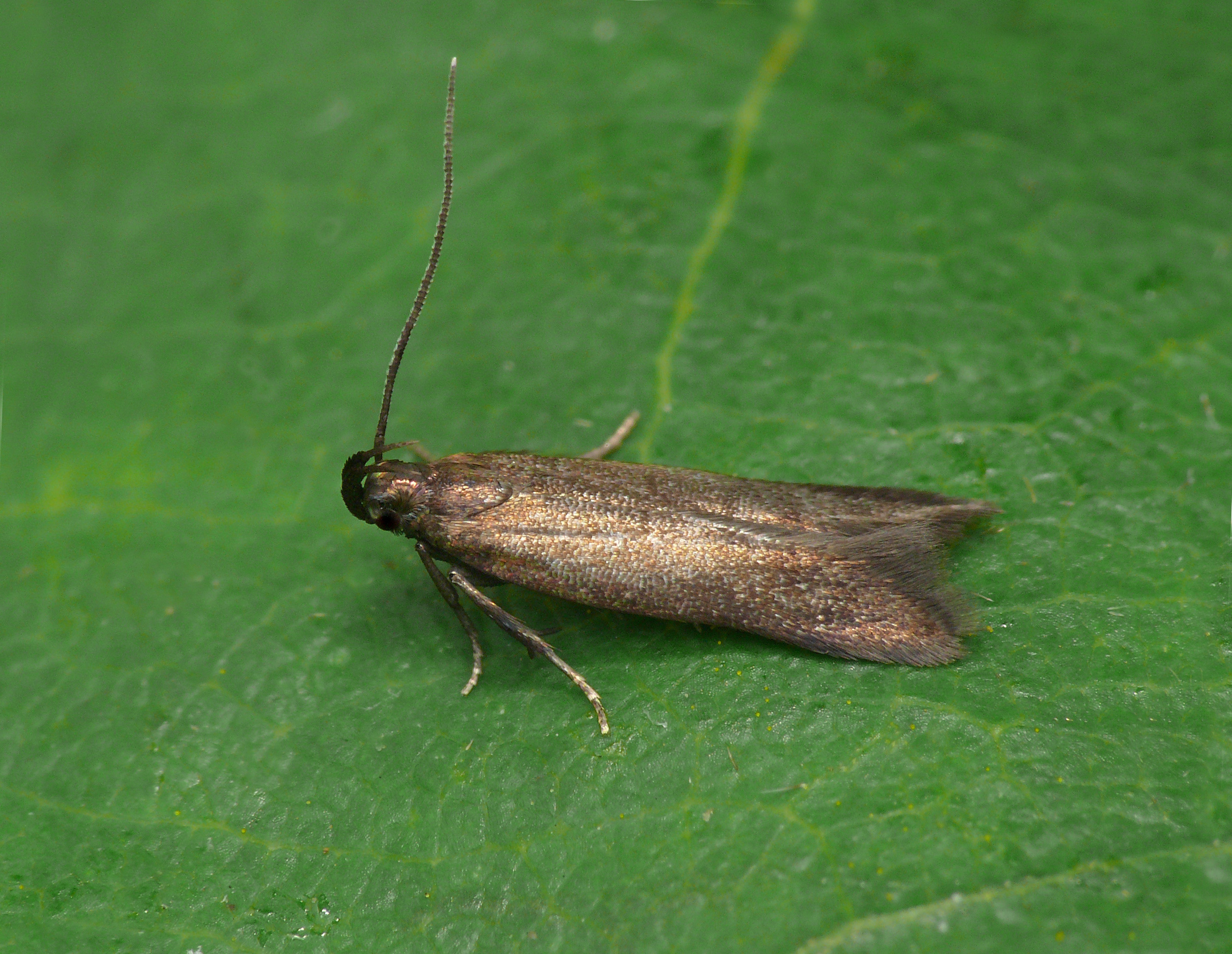

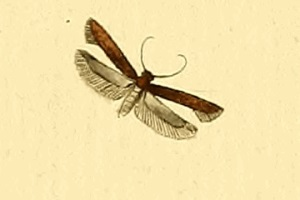

Scientific classification
- Kingdom: Animalia
- Phylum: Arthropoda
- Clade: Pancrustacea
- Class: Insecta
- Order: Lepidoptera
- Family: Gelechiidae
- Genus: Monochroa
- Species: M. tenebrella

Binomial name
- Monochroa tenebrella (Hübner, [1817])

Synonyms
- Tinea tenebrella Hübner, [1817]; Porrectaria fuscocuprea Haworth, 1828; Glyphipteryx subcuprella Stephens, 1834; Gelechia tenebrosella Zeller, 1839; Butalis buffonella Millière, 1876

= Monochroa tenebrella =

Species of moth

Monochroa tenebrella, the common plain neb, is a moth of the family Gelechiidae. It was described by Jacob Hübner in 1817. It is found in most of Europe. The habitat consists of open grassy areas and heathland.

The wingspan is 10–12 mm. The antennae with apical third in female white. Forewings unicolorous dark shining bronzy; base of costa purplish-tinged. Hindwings are grey. The larva is reddish; spots brown; head and plate of 2 black-brown.

Adults are on wing from June to July and are day-flying.

The larvae feed on Rumex acetosella. They feed on the roots and lower stems of their host plant.
