= Monochroa kumatai =

Scientific classification
- Domain: Eukaryota
- Kingdom: Animalia
- Phylum: Arthropoda
- Class: Insecta
- Order: Lepidoptera
- Family: Gelechiidae
- Genus: Monochroa
- Species: M. kumatai

Binomial name
- Monochroa kumatai Sakamaki, 1996

Species of moth

Monochroa kumatai is a moth of the family Gelechiidae. It was described by Sakamaki in 1996. It is found in Japan (Hokkaido, Honshu) and Korea.

The wingspan is 11.9-12.4 mm.
