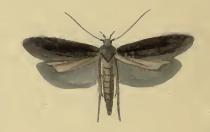
- Monochroa servella

Scientific classification
- Kingdom: Animalia
- Phylum: Arthropoda
- Clade: Pancrustacea
- Class: Insecta
- Order: Lepidoptera
- Family: Gelechiidae
- Subfamily: Anomologinae
- Genus: Monochroa; Heinemann, 1870

Synonyms
- Catabrachmia Rebel, 1909; Paltodora Meyrick, 1894; Opacochroa Omelko, 1998; Iridesna Omelko, 1998

= Monochroa =

Genus of moths

Monochroa is a genus of moths in the family Gelechiidae.

== Species ==
- Monochroa absconditella (Walker, 1864)
- Monochroa agatha (Meyrick, 1918)
- Monochroa ainella (Chrétien, 1908)
- Monochroa angustipennella (Clemens, 1863)
- Monochroa arundinetella (Stainton, 1858)
- Monochroa bronzella Karsholt, Nel, Fournier, Varenne & Huemer, 2013
- Monochroa chromophanes (Meyrick, 1938)
- Monochroa cleodora (Meyrick, 1935)
- Monochroa cleodoroides Sakamaki, 1994
- Monochroa conspersella (Herrich-Schäffer, 1854)
- Monochroa cytisella (Curtis, 1837)
- Monochroa dellabeffai (Rebel, 1932)
- Monochroa disconotella (Chambers, 1878)
- Monochroa discriminata (Meyrick, 1923)
- Monochroa divisella (Douglas, 1850)
- Monochroa drosocrypta (Meyrick, 1926)
- Monochroa elongella (Heinemann, 1870)
- Monochroa ferrea (Frey, 1870)
- Monochroa fervidella (Mann, 1864)
- Monochroa fragariae (Busck, 1919)
- Monochroa gilvolinella (Clemens, 1863)
- Monochroa gracilella (Chrétien, 1908)
- Monochroa harrisonella (Busck, 1904)
- Monochroa hornigi (Staudinger, 1883)
- Monochroa inflexella Svensson, 1992
- Monochroa ingravata (Meyrick, 1918)
- Monochroa japonica Sakamaki, 1996
- Monochroa kumatai Sakamaki, 1996
- Monochroa leptocrossa (Meyrick, 1926)
- Monochroa lucidella (Stephens, 1834)
- Monochroa lutulentella (Zeller, 1839)
- Monochroa melagonella (Constant, 1895)
- Monochroa monactis (Meyrick, 1923)
- Monochroa moyses Uffen, 1991
- Monochroa niphognatha (Gozmány, 1953)
- Monochroa nomadella (Zeller, 1868)
- Monochroa pallida Sakamaki, 1996
- Monochroa palustrella (Douglas, 1850)
- Monochroa parvulata (Gozmany, 1953)
- Monochroa pentameris (Meyrick, 1931)
- Monochroa perterrita (Meyrick, 1923)
- Monochroa pessocrossa (Meyrick, 1926)
- Monochroa placidella (Zeller, 1874)
- Monochroa plusia (Caradja, 1920)
- Monochroa pullusella (Chambers, 1874)
- Monochroa quinquepunctella (Busck, 1903)
- Monochroa rebeli (M. Hering, 1927)
- Monochroa repudiata (Meyrick, 1923)
- Monochroa robusta (Braun, 1921)
- Monochroa rufulella (Snellen, 1884)
- Monochroa rumicetella (Hofmann, 1868)
- Monochroa rutilella (Snellen, 1884)
- Monochroa saltenella (Benander, 1928)
- Monochroa scutatella (Müller-Rutz, 1920)
- Monochroa sepicolella (Herrich-Schäffer, 1854)
- Monochroa servella (Zeller, 1839)
- Monochroa simplicella (Lienig & Zeller, 1846)
- Monochroa sperata Huemer & Karsholt, 2010
- Monochroa subcostipunctella Sakamaki, 1996
- Monochroa suffusella (Douglas, 1850)
- Monochroa tenebrella (Hübner, 1817)
- Monochroa tetragonella (Stainton, 1885)
- Monochroa uralensis Junnilainen, 2010

== Status unclear ==
- Monochroa decolorella (Herrich-Schäffer, 1854), described as Anacampsia decolorella from Austria. Synonym: Doryphora luteella Heinemann, 1870
- Monochroa griseella (Heinemann, 1870), described as Doryphora griseella from Switzerland.
- Monochroa rhenanella (Heyden, 1863), described as Gelechia rhenanella from Germany.

== Selected former species ==
- Monochroa csornensis (Rebel, 1909)
- Monochroa nigromaculella (Millière, 1872)
