= Monochroa monactis =

Scientific classification
- Kingdom: Animalia
- Phylum: Arthropoda
- Class: Insecta
- Order: Lepidoptera
- Family: Gelechiidae
- Genus: Monochroa
- Species: M. monactis

Binomial name
- Monochroa monactis (Meyrick, 1923)

Synonyms
- Aristotelia monactis Meyrick, 1923

Species of moth

Monochroa monactis is a moth of the family Gelechiidae. It was described by Edward Meyrick in 1923. It is found in North America, where it has been recorded from southern Ontario and North Carolina.

The wingspan is 9–11 mm. The forewings are whitish, sprinkled with grey except towards the costa anteriorly, suffused with grey on the posterior third. The plical and second discal stigmata are black and distinct and there is a very oblique whitish striga from the costa at two-thirds to the termen beneath the apex, preceded and followed on the costa by dark grey suffusion, between this and the apex three or four whitish costal dots separated by dark grey suffusion. The hindwings are light grey.
