= Monochroa dellabeffai =

Scientific classification
- Kingdom: Animalia
- Phylum: Arthropoda
- Class: Insecta
- Order: Lepidoptera
- Family: Gelechiidae
- Genus: Monochroa
- Species: M. dellabeffai

Binomial name
- Monochroa dellabeffai (Rebel, 1932)

Synonyms
- Gelechia dellabeffai Rebel, 1932

Species of moth

Monochroa dellabeffai is a moth of the family Gelechiidae. It was described by Hans Rebel in 1932. It is found in France and Italy.

The wingspan is 15–16 mm.
