= Monochroa disconotella =

Scientific classification
- Kingdom: Animalia
- Phylum: Arthropoda
- Clade: Pancrustacea
- Class: Insecta
- Order: Lepidoptera
- Family: Gelechiidae
- Genus: Monochroa
- Species: M. disconotella

Binomial name
- Monochroa disconotella (Chambers, 1878)

Synonyms
- Gelechia disconotella Chambers, 1878

Species of moth

Monochroa disconotella is a moth of the family Gelechiidae. It was described by Vactor Tousey Chambers in 1878. It is found in North America, where it has been recorded from Kentucky, Maine, New Hampshire and Ohio.

Adults are pale fuscous, or rather ochreous yellow, irrorated (sprinkled) with fuscous, with a faint silky-roseate hue, and with a longitudinal-elliptical brown spot at the end of the cell.
