= Monochroa plusia =

Scientific classification
- Domain: Eukaryota
- Kingdom: Animalia
- Phylum: Arthropoda
- Class: Insecta
- Order: Lepidoptera
- Family: Gelechiidae
- Genus: Monochroa
- Species: M. plusia

Binomial name
- Monochroa plusia (Caradja, 1920)

Synonyms
- Xystophora plusia Caradja, 1920

Species of moth

Monochroa plusia is a moth of the family Gelechiidae. It was described by Aristide Caradja in 1920. It is found in the Russian Far East.
