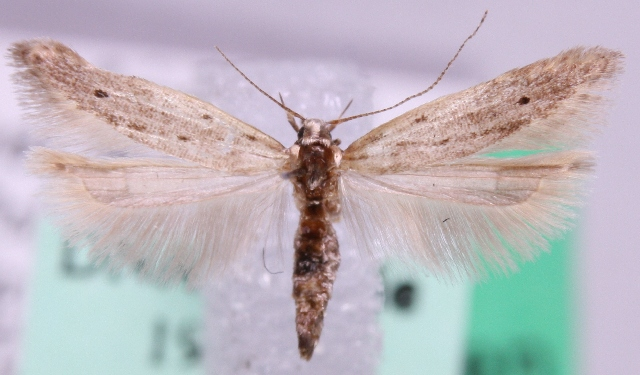

Scientific classification
- Kingdom: Animalia
- Phylum: Arthropoda
- Clade: Pancrustacea
- Class: Insecta
- Order: Lepidoptera
- Family: Gelechiidae
- Genus: Monochroa
- Species: M. niphognatha

Binomial name
- Monochroa niphognatha (Gozmány, 1953)

Synonyms
- Aristotelia (Xystophora) niphognatha Gozmány, 1953

= Monochroa niphognatha =

Species of moth

Monochroa niphognatha is a moth of the family Gelechiidae. It was described by László Anthony Gozmány in 1953. It is found in Great Britain, Germany, Denmark, Poland, Slovakia, Hungary, Sweden, Finland, Latvia and Ukraine.

The wingspan is 13–15 mm. Adults fly in June and July.

The larvae feed in the stem of Persicaria amphibia.
