= Monochroa melagonella =

Scientific classification
- Domain: Eukaryota
- Kingdom: Animalia
- Phylum: Arthropoda
- Class: Insecta
- Order: Lepidoptera
- Family: Gelechiidae
- Genus: Monochroa
- Species: M. melagonella

Binomial name
- Monochroa melagonella (Constant, 1895)

Synonyms
- Anacampsis melagonella Constant, 1895; Stomopteryx melagonella

Species of moth

Monochroa melagonella is a moth of the family Gelechiidae. It was described by Constant in 1895. It is found in Portugal, Spain, France, Italy and on Cyprus.

The wingspan is about 8 mm.

The larvae feed on Rubia peregrina and Rubia tenuifolia. The frass is dispersed in black grains. Larvae can be found from March to July.
