= Monochroa fervidella =

Scientific classification
- Domain: Eukaryota
- Kingdom: Animalia
- Phylum: Arthropoda
- Class: Insecta
- Order: Lepidoptera
- Family: Gelechiidae
- Genus: Monochroa
- Species: M. fervidella

Binomial name
- Monochroa fervidella (J. J. Mann, 1864)

Synonyms
- Gelechia fervidella J. J. Mann, 1864

Species of moth

Monochroa fervidella is a moth of the family Gelechiidae. It was described by Josef Johann Mann in 1864. It is found in Asia Minor.

The forewings are shining gold brown, shading to coppery red at the fold. There are three paler spots at the margin. Adults have been recorded on wing in June.
