= Monochroa pessocrossa =

Scientific classification
- Kingdom: Animalia
- Phylum: Arthropoda
- Class: Insecta
- Order: Lepidoptera
- Family: Gelechiidae
- Genus: Monochroa
- Species: M. pessocrossa

Binomial name
- Monochroa pessocrossa (Meyrick, 1926)

Synonyms
- Aristotelia pessocrossa Meyrick, 1926

Species of moth

Monochroa pessocrossa is a moth of the family Gelechiidae. It was described by Edward Meyrick in 1926. It is found in the Russian Far East.

The wingspan is 14–16 mm. The forewings are rather dark brownish fuscous with the plical and second discal stigmata somewhat elongate and blackish. The hindwings are pale grey.
