= Monochroa placidella =

Scientific classification
- Kingdom: Animalia
- Phylum: Arthropoda
- Clade: Pancrustacea
- Class: Insecta
- Order: Lepidoptera
- Family: Gelechiidae
- Genus: Monochroa
- Species: M. placidella

Binomial name
- Monochroa placidella (Zeller, 1874)

Synonyms
- Gelechia placidella Zeller, 1874; Aristotelia natalella Busck, 1904

Species of moth

Monochroa placidella is a moth of the family Gelechiidae. It was described by Philipp Christoph Zeller in 1874. It is found in North America, where it has been recorded from California, Washington, British Columbia and Arizona.

The wingspan is 15–16 mm. The forewings are rich saffron yellow, lightest at base, gradually deeper saffron toward the apex. At apical third is a hardly perceptible light ochreous costal streak, and similar light, inconspicuous dashes are found along the costal and dorsal edge on the apical third of the wing. Around the extreme apical edge is a prominent narrow black line before the cilia. The hindwings are dark fuscous.
