= Monochroa cleodora =

Scientific classification
- Kingdom: Animalia
- Phylum: Arthropoda
- Clade: Pancrustacea
- Class: Insecta
- Order: Lepidoptera
- Family: Gelechiidae
- Genus: Monochroa
- Species: M. cleodora

Binomial name
- Monochroa cleodora (Meyrick, 1935)

Synonyms
- Aristotelia cleodora Meyrick, 1935

Species of moth

Monochroa cleodora is a moth of the family Gelechiidae. It was described by Edward Meyrick in 1935. It is found in Japan (Honshu, Shikoku, Kyushu) and Korea.
