= Monochroa ingravata =

Scientific classification
- Kingdom: Animalia
- Phylum: Arthropoda
- Class: Insecta
- Order: Lepidoptera
- Family: Gelechiidae
- Genus: Monochroa
- Species: M. ingravata

Binomial name
- Monochroa ingravata (Meyrick, 1918)

Synonyms
- Aristotelia ingravata Meyrick, 1918

Species of moth

Monochroa ingravata is a moth of the family Gelechiidae. It was described by Edward Meyrick in 1918. It is found in the Bengal region of what was then British India.

The wingspan is about 9 mm. The forewings are pale ochreous or whitish ochreous with a thick black finely whitish-speckled costal streak from the base to three-fourths, occupying nearly half of wing, its lower edge with prominences before the middle of the wing and near the extremity probably indicating the discal stigmata. There is some black irroration (sprinkles) along the upper part of the termen to the apex. The hindwings are grey.
