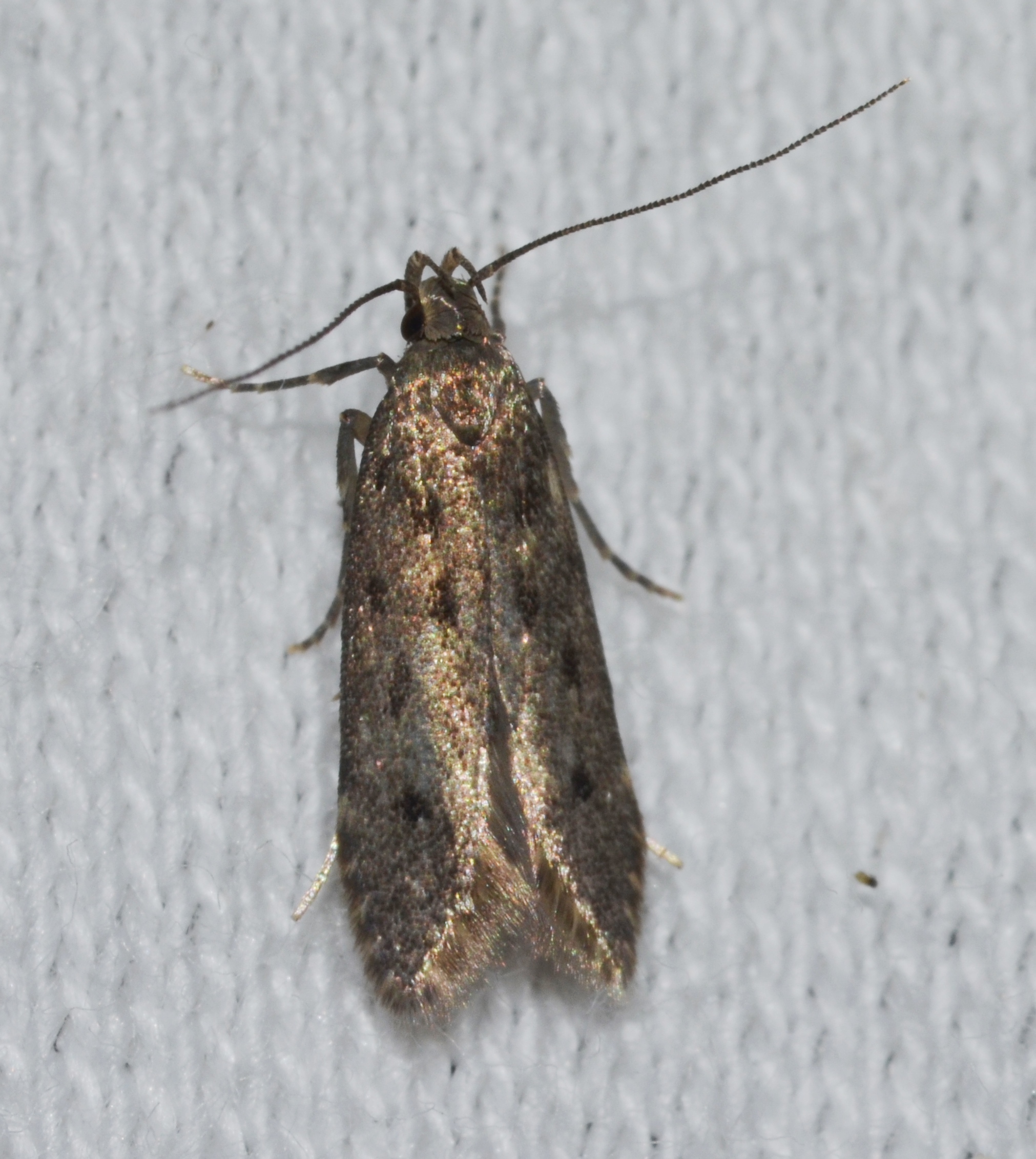

Scientific classification
- Domain: Eukaryota
- Kingdom: Animalia
- Phylum: Arthropoda
- Class: Insecta
- Order: Lepidoptera
- Family: Gelechiidae
- Genus: Monochroa
- Species: M. quinquepunctella

Binomial name
- Monochroa quinquepunctella (Busck, 1903)

Synonyms
- Aristotelia quinquepunctella Busck, 1903

= Monochroa quinquepunctella =

Species of moth

Monochroa quinquepunctella is a moth of the family Gelechiidae. It is found in North America, where it has been recorded from Alabama, Arkansas, Illinois, Indiana, Louisiana, Maine, Massachusetts, Mississippi, New Hampshire, North Carolina, Ohio, Quebec, South Carolina and Tennessee.

The wingspan is about 11.5 mm. The forewings are pale whitish yellow, sparsely sprinkled with fuscous on the disk, more strongly overlaid with fuscous along the edges and gradually more so toward the tip, which is quite dark. On the disk are four nearly equidistant black prominent dots forming a rhomb, one within the costal edge at the basal third, one opposite a little further outward within the dorsal margin on the fold, a third also on the fold near base, and the fourth on the middle of the wing. A fifth similar black spot is found just outside the end of the cell at the same distance from point four as that between the other dots. The hindwings are light silvery fuscous.
