= Monochroa ainella =

Scientific classification
- Domain: Eukaryota
- Kingdom: Animalia
- Phylum: Arthropoda
- Class: Insecta
- Order: Lepidoptera
- Family: Gelechiidae
- Genus: Monochroa
- Species: M. ainella

Binomial name
- Monochroa ainella (Chrétien, 1908)

Synonyms
- Apodia ainella Chrétien, 1908

Species of moth

Monochroa ainella is a moth of the family Gelechiidae. It was described by Pierre Chrétien in 1908. It is found in Algeria.

The wingspan is 10–13 mm. The forewings are ochreous yellow. The hindwings are grey.
