= Monochroa subcostipunctella =

Scientific classification
- Domain: Eukaryota
- Kingdom: Animalia
- Phylum: Arthropoda
- Class: Insecta
- Order: Lepidoptera
- Family: Gelechiidae
- Genus: Monochroa
- Species: M. subcostipunctella

Binomial name
- Monochroa subcostipunctella Sakamaki, 1996

Species of moth

Monochroa subcostipunctella is a moth of the family Gelechiidae. It was described by Sakamaki in 1996. It is found in Japan (Hokkaido and Honshu) and Korea.

Adults are on wing from mid-July to early August.

The larvae feed on Juncus species. Young larvae enter the stem of their host plant. Later, they move from this stem to another stem, and pupate within.
