= Xystophora mongolica =

Scientific classification
- Kingdom: Animalia
- Phylum: Arthropoda
- Clade: Pancrustacea
- Class: Insecta
- Order: Lepidoptera
- Family: Gelechiidae
- Genus: Xystophora
- Species: X. mongolica

Binomial name
- Xystophora mongolica Emelyanov & Piskunov, 1982

Species of moth

Xystophora mongolica is a moth of the family Gelechiidae. It was described by Emelyanov and Piskunov in 1982. It is found in Mongolia and Russia.
