= Monochroa drosocrypta =

Scientific classification
- Kingdom: Animalia
- Phylum: Arthropoda
- Class: Insecta
- Order: Lepidoptera
- Family: Gelechiidae
- Genus: Monochroa
- Species: M. drosocrypta

Binomial name
- Monochroa drosocrypta (Meyrick, 1926)

Synonyms
- Aristotelia drosocrypta Meyrick, 1926

Species of moth

Monochroa drosocrypta is a moth of the family Gelechiidae. It was described by Edward Meyrick in 1926. It is found in the Russian Far East.

The wingspan is about 11 mm. The forewings are dark fuscous speckled whitish. The stigmata are cloudy, obscurely blackish, with the plical very obliquely before the first discal. The hindwings are rather bluish grey.
