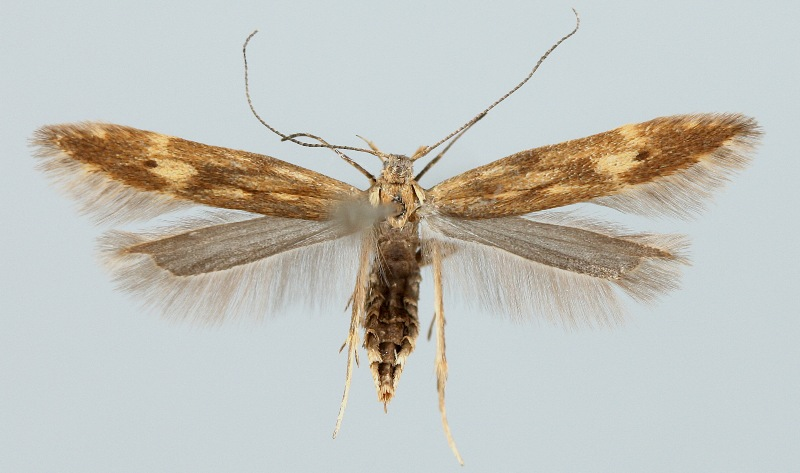

Scientific classification
- Kingdom: Animalia
- Phylum: Arthropoda
- Clade: Pancrustacea
- Class: Insecta
- Order: Lepidoptera
- Family: Gelechiidae
- Genus: Monochroa
- Species: M. lucidella

Binomial name
- Monochroa lucidella (Stephens, 1834)

Synonyms
- Cleodora lucidella Stephens, 1834; Xystophora scordiscella Rebel, 1904; Catabrachmia unipunctella Amsel, 1935

= Monochroa lucidella =

Species of moth

Monochroa lucidella is a moth of the family Gelechiidae. It is found in most of Europe, except Spain, Switzerland and most of the Balkan Peninsula. It is recorded from the Near East and Siberia (Transbaikalia).

The wingspan is 12–14 mm. The forewings are very pointed, fuscous, mievenly sprinkled with ochreous-whitish, sometimes forming indistinct darker and lighter fasciae; an oblong ochreous-whitish suffusion in disc at 2/3 followed by a dark fuscous dot; a very indistinct ochreous-whitish tornal spot beneath this, and costal spot beyond it. Hindwings are grey.

Adults are on wing from June to July.

The larvae feed within stems of common spike-rush.

== Subspecies ==
- Monochroa lucidella immaculatella Huemer, 1996 (Italy)
- Monochroa lucidella lucidella (Stephens, 1834)
