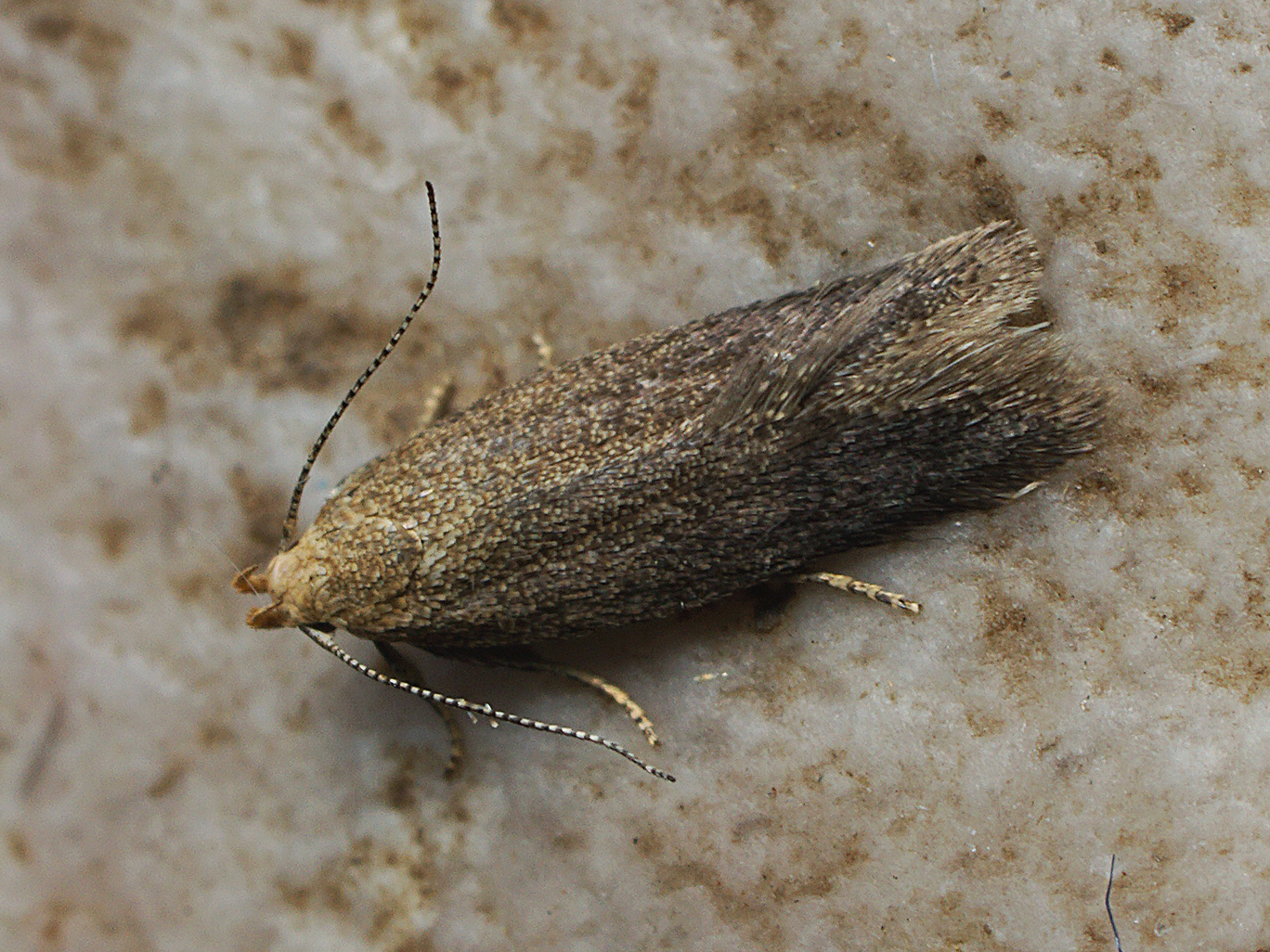

Scientific classification
- Kingdom: Animalia
- Phylum: Arthropoda
- Class: Insecta
- Order: Lepidoptera
- Family: Gelechiidae
- Genus: Xystophora
- Species: X. pulveratella

Binomial name
- Xystophora pulveratella (Herrich-Schäffer, 1854)

Synonyms
- Anacampsis pulveratella Herrich-Schäffer, 1854; Aristotelia intaminatella Stainton, 1860; Gelechia steudeliella Frey, 1880

= Xystophora pulveratella =

Species of moth

Xystophora pulveratella is a moth of the family Gelechiidae. It is found from central and northern Europe to the Ural Mountains and southern Siberia.

The wingspan is 10–11 mm. They are on wing from May to June.

The larvae have been found on Trifolium pratense, Lotus corniculatus, Vicia, Medicago and Lathyrus palustris. They feed from within spun leaves. The larvae can be found from August to September. The species overwinters in the cocoon.
