= Monochroa absconditella =

Scientific classification
- Kingdom: Animalia
- Phylum: Arthropoda
- Clade: Pancrustacea
- Class: Insecta
- Order: Lepidoptera
- Family: Gelechiidae
- Genus: Monochroa
- Species: M. absconditella

Binomial name
- Monochroa absconditella (Walker, 1864)

Synonyms
- Gelechia absconditella Walker, 1864; Gelechia palpiannulella Chambers, 1872

Species of moth

Monochroa absconditella is a moth of the family Gelechiidae. It was described by Francis Walker in 1864. It is found in North America, where it has been recorded from Florida, Illinois, Maine, Mississippi, New Hampshire and Ohio.

The wingspan is about 12.7 mm (0.50 in). Adults are on wing from January to February and from April to December.

The larvae feed in the stem of Ampelopsis and Polygonum species (including Polygonum densilflorum and Persicaria punctata).
