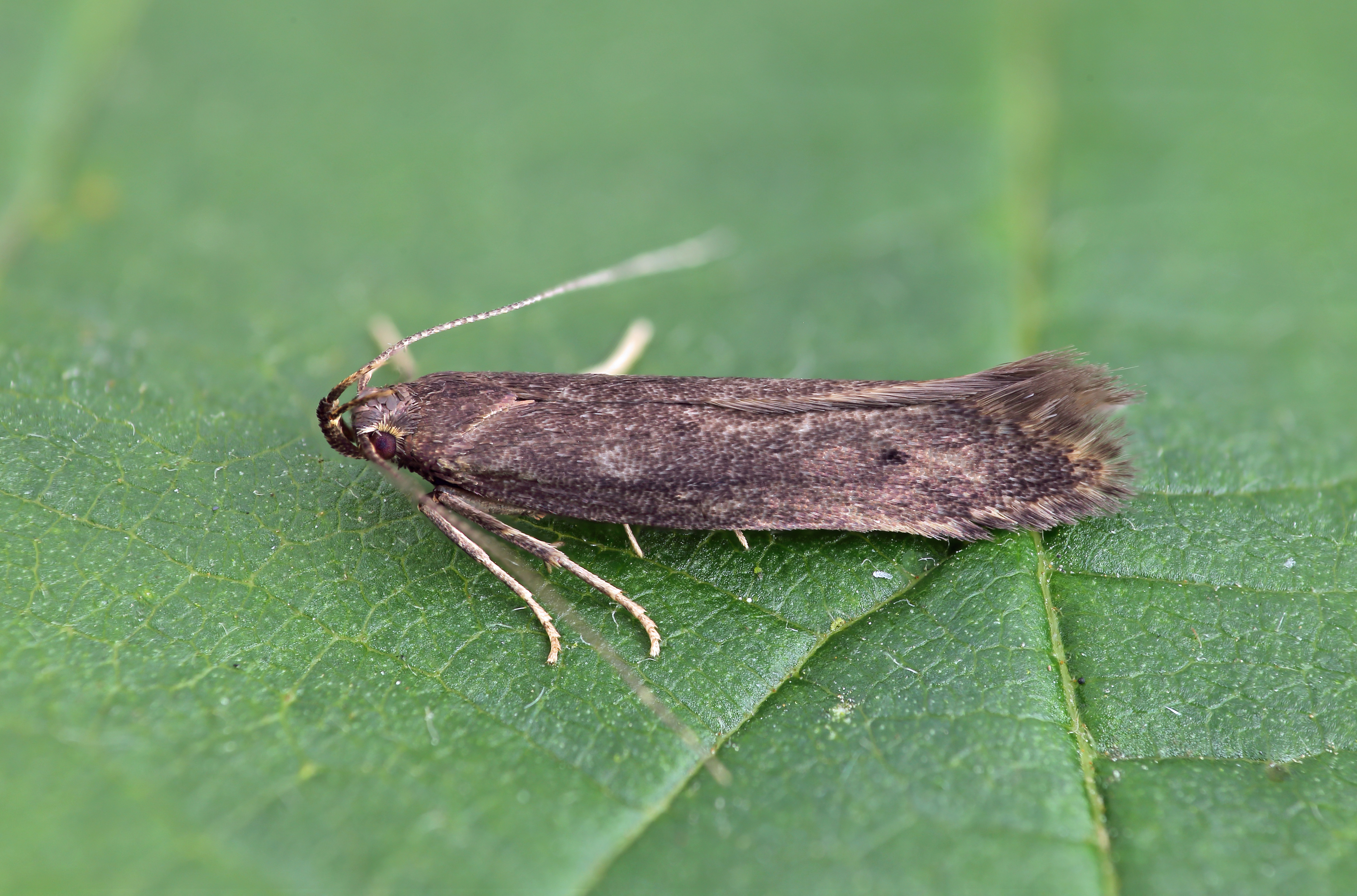

Scientific classification
- Kingdom: Animalia
- Phylum: Arthropoda
- Clade: Pancrustacea
- Class: Insecta
- Order: Lepidoptera
- Family: Gelechiidae
- Genus: Monochroa
- Species: M. lutulentella

Binomial name
- Monochroa lutulentella (Zeller, 1839)

Synonyms
- Gelechia lutulentella Zeller, 1839; Xystophora brunickii Rebel, 1913

= Monochroa lutulentella =

Species of moth

Monochroa lutulentella, the black neb, is a moth of the family Gelechiidae. It is widely distributed in northern Europe and the central European mountains, east to the Ural Mountains. The habitat consists of fens, marshes and on river-banks.

The wingspan is 14–16 mm. The abdomen is ochreous yellowish towards base. Forewings varying from light ochreous brownish to dark fuscous, glossy; second discal stigma indistinctly darker. Hindwings are very pale grey.

Adults are on wing from the end of July to the beginning of August.

The larvae feed on Filipendula ulmaria. They feed within the roots of their host plant.
