= Monochroa japonica =

Scientific classification
- Domain: Eukaryota
- Kingdom: Animalia
- Phylum: Arthropoda
- Class: Insecta
- Order: Lepidoptera
- Family: Gelechiidae
- Genus: Monochroa
- Species: M. japonica

Binomial name
- Monochroa japonica Sakamaki, 1996

Species of moth

Monochroa japonica is a moth of the family Gelechiidae. It was described by Sakamaki in 1996. It is found in Japan (Hokkaido, Honshu, Kyushu) and Korea.

Adults emerge in early summer.

The larvae feed within the stem of Polygonum thunbergii. Pupation takes place within the stem in late spring.
