= Monochroa perterrita =

Scientific classification
- Kingdom: Animalia
- Phylum: Arthropoda
- Clade: Pancrustacea
- Class: Insecta
- Order: Lepidoptera
- Family: Gelechiidae
- Genus: Monochroa
- Species: M. perterrita

Binomial name
- Monochroa perterrita (Meyrick, 1923)

Synonyms
- Aristotelia perterrita Meyrick, 1923

Species of moth

Monochroa perterrita is a moth of the family Gelechiidae. It was described by Edward Meyrick in 1923. It is found in North America, where it has been recorded from southern Ontario.

The wingspan is about 14 mm. The forewings are ochreous whitish, on the apical third and towards the tornus more ochreous tinged and sprinkled with light greyish. The plical and second discal stigmata are small, blackish and widely remote. The hindwings are grey.
