= Monochroa angustipennella =

Scientific classification
- Kingdom: Animalia
- Phylum: Arthropoda
- Clade: Pancrustacea
- Class: Insecta
- Order: Lepidoptera
- Family: Gelechiidae
- Genus: Monochroa
- Species: M. angustipennella

Binomial name
- Monochroa angustipennella (Clemens, 1863)

Synonyms
- Gelechia angustipennella Clemens, 1863; Aristotelia kearfottella Busck, 1903

Species of moth

Monochroa angustipennella is a moth of the family Gelechiidae. It was described by James Brackenridge Clemens in 1863. It is found in North America, where it has been recorded from California, Illinois, Maine, New Jersey, New York, Ohio, Oklahoma and Pennsylvania.

The wingspan is about 12 mm. The base of the forewings is silvery white, gradually becoming overlaid with fuscous outward. The outer half of the wing dark fuscous with a silvery-yellowish luster. At the end of the cell is a small round black dot and at the beginning of the costal cilia is a short oblique triangular light yellow spot. At the base of the cilia, round the entire apical edge, is a heavy deep black line, interrupted by four costal and three dorsal short indistinct yellowish-white dashes, which are faintly continued out in the dark fuscous cilia. The dorsal edge opposite the costal triangular spot is yellowish. The hindwings are dark fuscous, nearly black, with silvery reflections.
