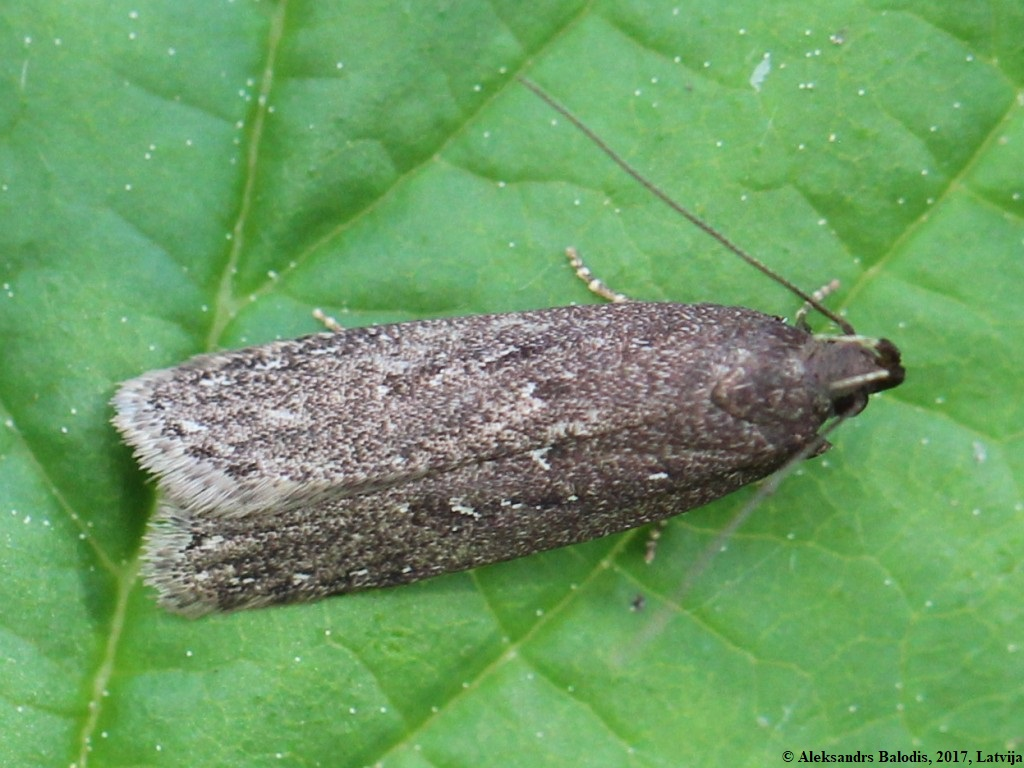

Scientific classification
- Domain: Eukaryota
- Kingdom: Animalia
- Phylum: Arthropoda
- Class: Insecta
- Order: Lepidoptera
- Family: Gelechiidae
- Genus: Monochroa
- Species: M. conspersella

Binomial name
- Monochroa conspersella (Herrich-Schäffer, 1854)

Synonyms
- Gelechia conspersella Herrich-Schäffer, 1854; Gelechia morosa Mühlig, 1864; Xystiphora morosa; Anacampsis quaestionella Herrich-Schäffer, 1854

= Monochroa conspersella =

Species of moth

Monochroa conspersella is a moth of the family Gelechiidae. In Europe, it is found from the Alps to the north. In the east, the range extends to the southern Ural and the Middle Volga, as well as Japan.

The wingspan is 11–12 mm. Adults are on wing from May to August.

The larvae feed on Lysimachia vulgaris. They mine the leaves of their host plant. The larvae can be found from September to the beginning of winter.
