= Xystophora kostjuki =

Scientific classification
- Kingdom: Animalia
- Phylum: Arthropoda
- Class: Insecta
- Order: Lepidoptera
- Family: Gelechiidae
- Genus: Xystophora
- Species: X. kostjuki

Binomial name
- Xystophora kostjuki Bidzilya, 2000

Species of moth

Xystophora kostjuki is a moth of the family Gelechiidae. It was described by Oleksiy V. Bidzilya in 2000. It is found in the Tuva Republic of Russia.
