= Monochroa robusta =

Scientific classification
- Domain: Eukaryota
- Kingdom: Animalia
- Phylum: Arthropoda
- Class: Insecta
- Order: Lepidoptera
- Family: Gelechiidae
- Genus: Monochroa
- Species: M. robusta

Binomial name
- Monochroa robusta (Braun, 1921)

Synonyms
- Aristotelia robusta Braun, 1921

Species of moth

Monochroa robusta is a moth of the family Gelechiidae. It was described by Annette Frances Braun in 1921. It is found in North America, where it has been recorded from Ohio and South Carolina.

The wingspan is 11–12 mm. The forewings are dull ocherous, rather densely overlaid with purplish fuscous dusting, especially toward the apex, where it obscures the ground color. Before the middle of the wing and the beginning within the costa, a darker shade crosses the wing very obliquely to the fold where it spreads out, rarely reaching the dorsal margin near the tornus. At two-thirds a not very oblique yellowish costal streak passes to the middle of the wing just beyond the rather elongate black spot at the end of the cell. A dark line at the base of the cilia is broken on the costa by four faint ocherous spots and similar pale spots are sometimes visible along the termen. The hindwings are fuscous.

The larvae feed on Scirpus atrovirens. They mine the leaves of their host plant. The mine extends toward the tip of the leaf, beginning as a small transparent blotch, with an opening on the underside of the leaf. Following this is a linear green portion with sides nearly parallel, in which the leaf substance is not eaten. Beyond this, the mine expands and becomes larger and semi-transparent. When ready to pupate, the larva leaves the mine through a circular hole in the upperside of the linear green portion. The larvae are whitish with a black head.
