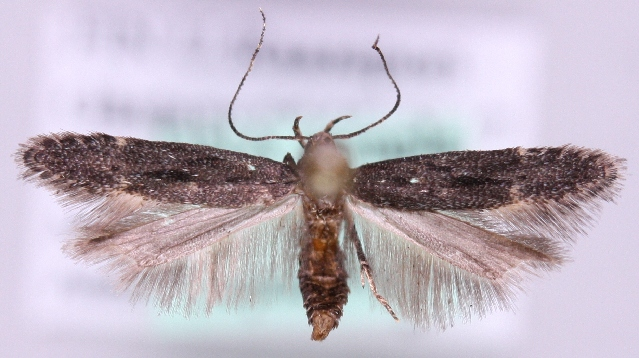

Scientific classification
- Kingdom: Animalia
- Phylum: Arthropoda
- Clade: Pancrustacea
- Class: Insecta
- Order: Lepidoptera
- Family: Gelechiidae
- Genus: Monochroa
- Species: M. elongella

Binomial name
- Monochroa elongella (Heinemann, 1870)

Synonyms
- Doryphora elongella Heinemann, 1870; Aristotelia micrometra Meyrick, 1935

= Monochroa elongella =

Species of moth

Monochroa elongella, the Pembroke neb, is a moth of the family Gelechiidae. It is widely distributed throughout Europe. Outside of Europe, it is found in southern Siberia (Transbaikalia, Altai and Tuva). The habitat consists of coastal sand-dunes and chalk downland.

The wingspan is 12–15 mm. Adults are on wing from June to August.

The larvae feed on Potentilla anserina. They feed in the roostock of their host plant. Larvae can be found from late August to May. Pupation takes place in the stem.
