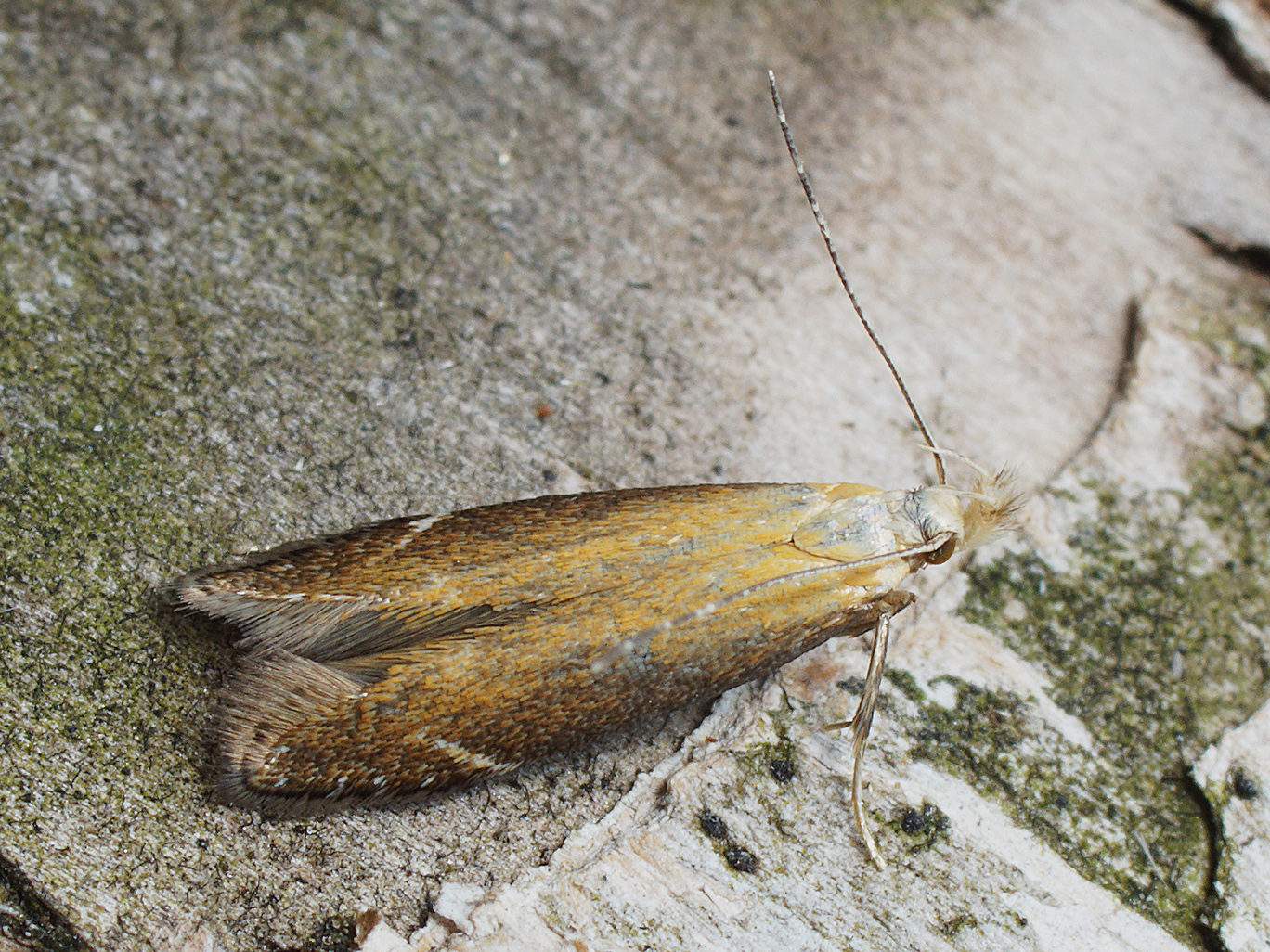

Scientific classification
- Domain: Eukaryota
- Kingdom: Animalia
- Phylum: Arthropoda
- Class: Insecta
- Order: Lepidoptera
- Family: Gelechiidae
- Genus: Monochroa
- Species: M. cytisella

Binomial name
- Monochroa cytisella (Curtis, 1837)

Synonyms
- List: Cleodora cytisella Curtis, 1837; Anacampsis fuscipennis Humphreys & Westwood, 1845; Gelechia walkeriella Douglas, 1850; Eupleuris coenulentella Herrich-Schäffer, 1854; Aristotelia clinosema Meyrick, 1935; Paltodora griseocapitella Bentinck, 1949

= Monochroa cytisella =

Species of moth

Monochroa cytisella is a moth of the family Gelechiidae and found in most of Europe. The larva feed in the stems of bracken causing a slight gall.

== Description ==
The wingspan is 10–12 mm. The head is ochreous-whitish. Forewings are ochreous - yellowish, towards costa sprinkled or suffused with fuscous; a yellowish-white streak from 4/5 of costa towards termen, not reaching it; usually an indistinct outwardly oblique whitish tornal mark. Hindwings are grey.

Adults are on wing in July. There is one generation per year.

The larvae feed within a bracken (Pteridium aquilinum) stem, in a slight gall. The gall is a slight swelling, usually in the rachis, up to 15 mm (occasionally 25 mm) long. Initially it is green and later brown; the shoot beyond the gall is poorly developed or dies. Pupation takes place in the gall.

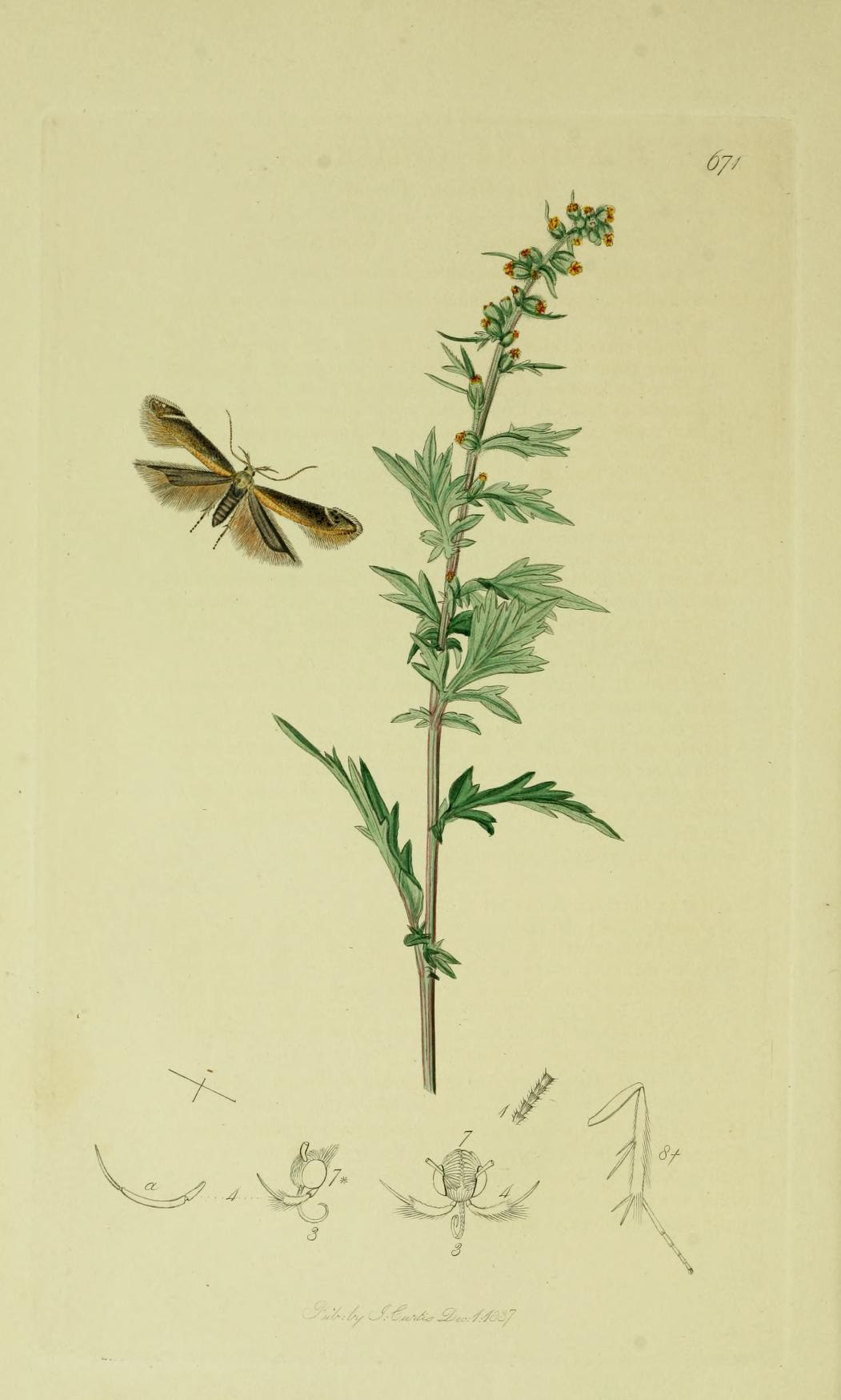
Illustration from John Curtis's British Entomology Volume 6

== Distribution ==
Found in most of mainland Europe from Ireland to Ukraine, and some of the Mediterranean islands, such as Sardinia and Sicily.

== Etymology ==
English entomologist, John Curtis originally named the moth, Cleodora cytisella in 1837 from three type localities, Glengarriff, County Cork, the Isle of Wight and London. It was later moved to the genus Monochroa; from the Greek monos, i.e., single and khros skin and referring to the unicolorous of some of the moths in the genus. The moths specific name cytisella is mistakenly named after the genus of broom Cytisus; despite the foodplant being bracken.
