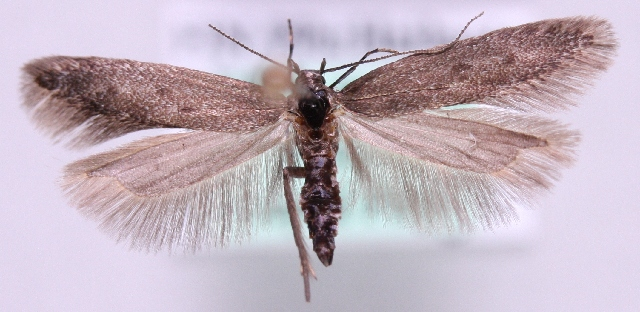

Scientific classification
- Kingdom: Animalia
- Phylum: Arthropoda
- Class: Insecta
- Order: Lepidoptera
- Family: Gelechiidae
- Genus: Monochroa
- Species: M. ferrea

Binomial name
- Monochroa ferrea (Frey, 1870)

Synonyms
- Gelechia ferrea Frey, 1870; Doryphora latiuscula Heinemann, 1870; Xystophora alfkeni Amsel, 1938

= Monochroa ferrea =

Species of moth

Monochroa ferrea is a moth of the family Gelechiidae. It is found from central and northern Europe to the southern Ural. Outside of Europe, it is found in Transbaikalia and the Altai region.

The wingspan is 12–13 mm. Adults are on wing from June to August.

The larvae feed on Carex species, including Carex ericetorum.
