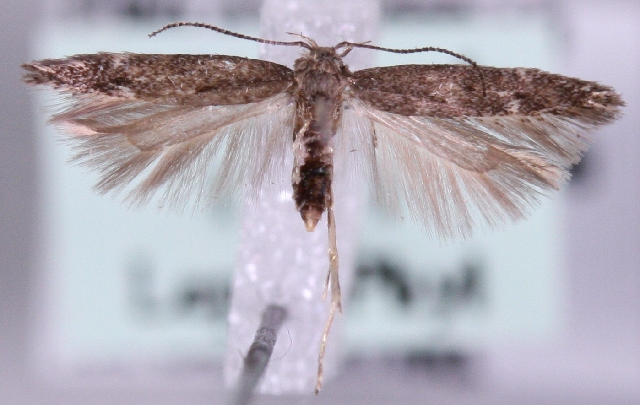

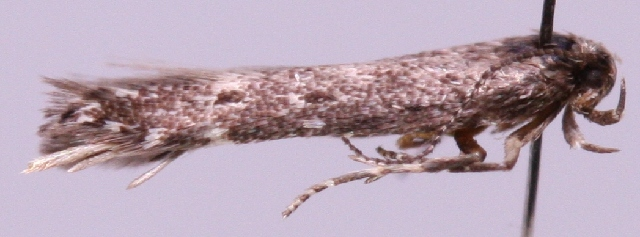

Scientific classification
- Kingdom: Animalia
- Phylum: Arthropoda
- Clade: Pancrustacea
- Class: Insecta
- Order: Lepidoptera
- Family: Gelechiidae
- Genus: Monochroa
- Species: M. rumicetella

Binomial name
- Monochroa rumicetella (O. Hofmann, [1868])

Synonyms
- Gelechia rumicetella O. Hofmann, 1868; Xystophora acutangulella Heinemann, 1870; Aristotelia leptotechna Meyrick, 1937

= Monochroa rumicetella =

Species of moth

Monochroa rumicetella is a moth of the family Gelechiidae. It was described by O. Hofmann in 1868. It is found from Fennoscandia and Belarus to Portugal, the Alps and Greece, and from France to Romania.

The wingspan is 10–11 mm. Adults are on wing in May.

The larvae feed on Rumex acetosa and Rumex acetosella. They mine the leaves of their host plant. Larvae can be found in July and August.
