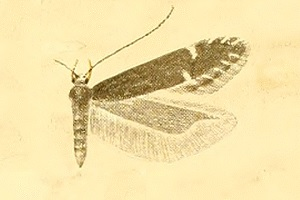

Scientific classification
- Domain: Eukaryota
- Kingdom: Animalia
- Phylum: Arthropoda
- Class: Insecta
- Order: Lepidoptera
- Family: Gelechiidae
- Genus: Monochroa
- Species: M. scutatella

Binomial name
- Monochroa scutatella (Müller-Rutz, 1920)

Synonyms
- Xystophora scutatella Müller-Rutz, 1920

= Monochroa scutatella =

Species of moth

Monochroa scutatella is a moth of the family Gelechiidae. It was described by Johann Müller-Rutz in 1920. It is found in Switzerland and Italy.
