= Monochroa agatha =

Scientific classification
- Kingdom: Animalia
- Phylum: Arthropoda
- Class: Insecta
- Order: Lepidoptera
- Family: Gelechiidae
- Genus: Monochroa
- Species: M. agatha

Binomial name
- Monochroa agatha (Meyrick, 1918)

Synonyms
- Aristotelia agatha Meyrick, 1918

Species of moth

Monochroa agatha is a moth of the family Gelechiidae. It was described by Edward Meyrick in 1918. It is found in Assam, India.

The wingspan is about 13 mm. The forewings are ferruginous brown with a very oblique indistinct darker streak from near the base of the costa to below the fold and a spot of deeper suffusion on the costa at one-third. The plical and first discal stigmata are deeper brown, faintly edged with whitish posteriorly, the plical very obliquely anterior, the second discal dark fuscous, finely pale edged. There are three costal and two terminal whitish dots towards the apex, the apical edge blackish between these. The hindwings are dark fuscous.
