= Monochroa repudiata =

Scientific classification
- Kingdom: Animalia
- Phylum: Arthropoda
- Class: Insecta
- Order: Lepidoptera
- Family: Gelechiidae
- Genus: Monochroa
- Species: M. repudiata

Binomial name
- Monochroa repudiata (Meyrick, 1923)

Synonyms
- Aristotelia repudiata Meyrick, 1923

Species of moth

Monochroa repudiata is a moth of the family Gelechiidae. It was described by Edward Meyrick in 1923. It is found in Assam, India.

The wingspan is about 15 mm. The forewings are dark fuscous with the plical and second discal stigmata blackish. There is a slight whitish mark on the costa at two-thirds. The hindwings are light greyish or whitish grey.
