= Monochroa sperata =

Scientific classification
- Kingdom: Animalia
- Phylum: Arthropoda
- Clade: Pancrustacea
- Class: Insecta
- Order: Lepidoptera
- Family: Gelechiidae
- Genus: Monochroa
- Species: M. sperata

Binomial name
- Monochroa sperata Huemer & Karsholt, 2010

Species of moth

Monochroa sperata is a moth of the family Gelechiidae. It was described by Peter Huemer and Ole Karsholt in 2010. It is found in the south-western Alps of France and Italy.
