= Monochroa moyses =

Scientific classification
- Domain: Eukaryota
- Kingdom: Animalia
- Phylum: Arthropoda
- Class: Insecta
- Order: Lepidoptera
- Family: Gelechiidae
- Genus: Monochroa
- Species: M. moyses

Binomial name
- Monochroa moyses Uffen, 1991

Species of moth

Monochroa moyses is a moth of the family Gelechiidae. It was described by Uffen in 1991. It is found in Portugal, Great Britain, Belgium, and the Netherlands. Adult males have wings 8.5 mm across and light brown forewings. The hindwings are mottled grey. Larvae have light brown heads and pale pinkish-white heads. The larvae feed on Bolboschoenus maritimus and possibly Scirpus sylvaticus. They mine the leaves of their host plant.

== Taxonomy ==
Monochroa moyses was described in 1991 by the English entomologist R. W. J. Uffen in 1991 based on a male specimen collected from East Mersea, Essex, as a larva in 1986. It is named after Moses, a reference to the larvae being hidden in rushes. Additionally, one of the sites where it was first observed by Uffen is located near Mucking church.

== Description ==
Adult males have wings 8.5 mm across and light brown forewings. The hindwings are mottled grey.

Larvae have light brown heads and pale pinkish-white heads. The mines made by them are full depth gallery and up to 10 cm long. They start off less than one millimetre wide near the hole where the larva enters the leaf, before ascending towards the tip. The end of the mine can be up to 25 mm wide. The larvae leave the mines to hibernate via an opening near the entrance, near which it makes a "safety net". All the frass is removed from the mine and caught in the safety net.

== Distribution ==
The species has been recorded from Britain, Portugal, Belgium, and the Netherlands.

== Ecology ==
The larvae feed on Bolboschoenus maritimus and possibly Scirpus sylvaticus. They emerge from their mines to overwinter between July and September. They can be induced to pupate in their mines by keeping them in sleeves filled with moist Sphagnum moss.
