= Monochroa inflexella =

Scientific classification
- Domain: Eukaryota
- Kingdom: Animalia
- Phylum: Arthropoda
- Class: Insecta
- Order: Lepidoptera
- Family: Gelechiidae
- Genus: Monochroa
- Species: M. inflexella

Binomial name
- Monochroa inflexella Svensson, 1992

Species of moth

Monochroa inflexella is a moth of the family Gelechiidae. It is found in Sweden, Lithuania, the Czech Republic, Slovakia, Austria, Romania and Russia (the southern Ural).

The wingspan is 9–14 mm. Adults are on wing from June to July.
