= Monochroa rebeli =

Scientific classification
- Domain: Eukaryota
- Kingdom: Animalia
- Phylum: Arthropoda
- Class: Insecta
- Order: Lepidoptera
- Family: Gelechiidae
- Genus: Monochroa
- Species: M. rebeli

Binomial name
- Monochroa rebeli (M. Hering, 1927)

Synonyms
- Xystophora rebeli Hering, 1927

Species of moth

Monochroa rebeli is a moth of the family Gelechiidae. It was described by M. Hering in 1927. It is found on the Canary Islands.

The wingspan is about 8 mm.
