= Monochroa fragariae =

Scientific classification
- Domain: Eukaryota
- Kingdom: Animalia
- Phylum: Arthropoda
- Class: Insecta
- Order: Lepidoptera
- Family: Gelechiidae
- Genus: Monochroa
- Species: M. fragariae

Binomial name
- Monochroa fragariae (Busck, 1919)

Synonyms
- Aristotelia fragariae Busck, 1919

Species of moth

Monochroa fragariae, the strawberry crown miner moth, is a moth of the family Gelechiidae. It was described by August Busck in 1919. It is found in North America, where it has been recorded from Oregon and British Columbia.

The wingspan is about 12 mm. The forewings are dark fuscous, overlaid with sparse yellowish scales and with three indistinct and ill-defined blackish-brown spots on the cell and another more defined black spot at the end of the cell. At the apical third is an indistinct yellowish costal streak and around the edge is a postmarginal black line on the base of the cilia. The hindwings are light fuscous.

They feed on the root crowns of Fragaria species.
