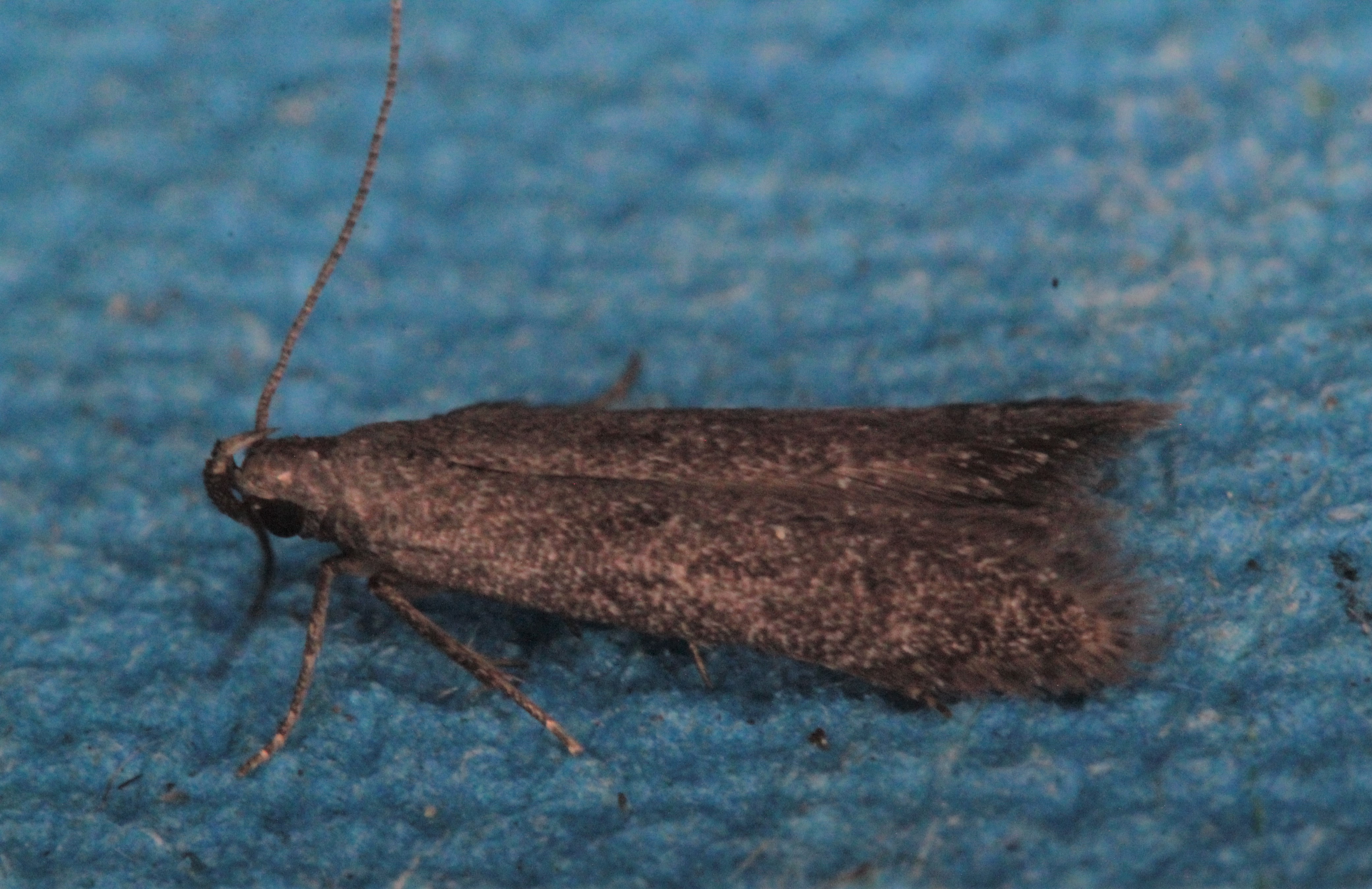

Scientific classification
- Domain: Eukaryota
- Kingdom: Animalia
- Phylum: Arthropoda
- Class: Insecta
- Order: Lepidoptera
- Family: Gelechiidae
- Genus: Monochroa
- Species: M. hornigi

Binomial name
- Monochroa hornigi (Staudinger, 1883)

Synonyms
- Doryphora hornigi Staudinger, 1883; Monochroa nordmanella Bruun, 1958

= Monochroa hornigi =

Species of moth

Monochroa hornigi, the knotweed neb, is a moth of the family Gelechiidae. It was described by Otto Staudinger in 1883. It is found in most of Europe (except Ireland, Belgium, Luxembourg, Spain and most of the Balkan Peninsula), European Russia, western and south-eastern Siberia, Transbaikalia, Korea and Japan (Hokkaido).

The wingspan is about 9–12 mm. Adults are on wing from July to August in one generation per year.

The larvae feed on Polygonum species, including Polygonum lapathifolium and Polygonum aviculare. They mine the stems of their host plant and overwinter in a silken chamber.
