= Monochroa rufulella =

Scientific classification
- Kingdom: Animalia
- Phylum: Arthropoda
- Class: Insecta
- Order: Lepidoptera
- Family: Gelechiidae
- Genus: Monochroa
- Species: M. rufulella

Binomial name
- Monochroa rufulella (Snellen, 1884)

Synonyms
- Xystophora rufulella Snellen, 1884

Species of moth

Monochroa rufulella is a moth of the family Gelechiidae. It was described by Snellen in 1884. It is found in Russia (Irkutsk).

The wingspan is about 14 mm. The forewings are light ochreous brown with slightly paler veins. The hindwings are light grey.
