= Monochroa bronzella =

Scientific classification
- Kingdom: Animalia
- Phylum: Arthropoda
- Clade: Pancrustacea
- Class: Insecta
- Order: Lepidoptera
- Family: Gelechiidae
- Genus: Monochroa
- Species: M. bronzella

Binomial name
- Monochroa bronzella Karsholt, Nel, Fournier, Varenne & Huemer, 2013

Species of moth

Monochroa bronzella is a moth of the family Gelechiidae. It is found in the south-western Alps of France and north-western Italy. The habitat consists of steppic and xerothermic slopes.

The wingspan is 13–16 mm for males and about 9 mm for females.
