= Tridrepana bifurcata =

Scientific classification
- Domain: Eukaryota
- Kingdom: Animalia
- Phylum: Arthropoda
- Class: Insecta
- Order: Lepidoptera
- Family: Drepanidae
- Genus: Tridrepana
- Species: T. bifurcata

Binomial name
- Tridrepana bifurcata Chen, 1985

Species of hook-tip moth

Tridrepana bifurcata is a moth in the family Drepanidae. It was described by X. Y. Chen in 1985. It is found in China in Hainan, Yunnan and Tibet.

Adults are similar to Tridrepana crocea, but can be distinguished by the browner ground colour.
