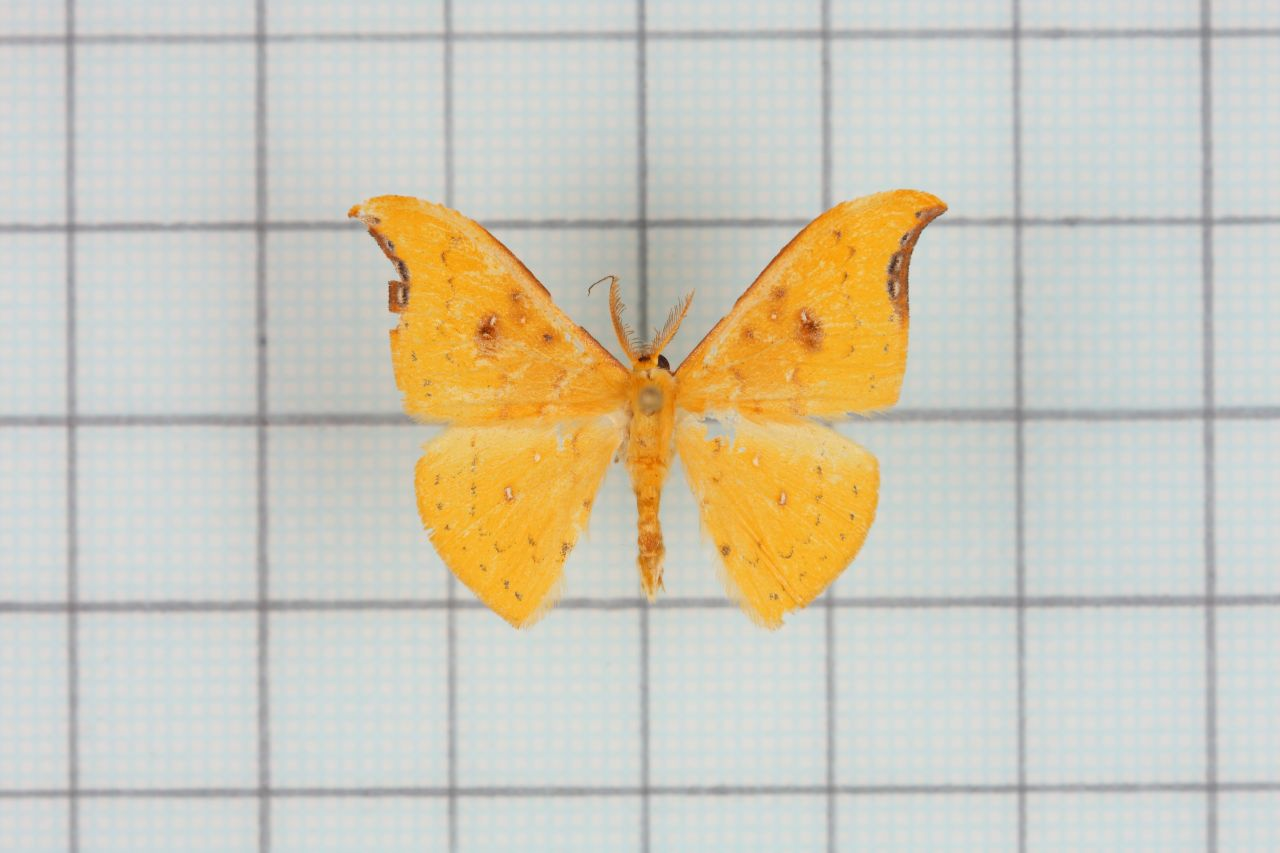

Scientific classification
- Domain: Eukaryota
- Kingdom: Animalia
- Phylum: Arthropoda
- Class: Insecta
- Order: Lepidoptera
- Family: Drepanidae
- Genus: Tridrepana
- Species: T. arikana

Binomial name
- Tridrepana arikana (Matsumura, 1921)

Synonyms
- Konjikia arikana Matsumura, 1921; Iridrepana falcipennis Warren, 1922; Tridrepana falcipennis; Tridrepana emina Chu & Wang, 1988

= Tridrepana arikana =

Species of hook-tip moth

Tridrepana arikana is a moth in the family Drepanidae first described by Shōnen Matsumura in 1921. It is found in China, India and Taiwan.

The wingspan is 24–28 mm.

The larvae feed on the leaves of Sapindus mukorossi and Koelreuteria elegans formosana.

== Subspecies ==
- Tridrepana arikana arikana (Taiwan)
- Tridrepana arikana emina Chu & Wang, 1988 (China: Hainan)
- Tridrepana arikana falcipennis (Warren, 1922) (Bhutan, China: Guangdong, Guangxi)
