= Tridrepana finita =

Scientific classification
- Domain: Eukaryota
- Kingdom: Animalia
- Phylum: Arthropoda
- Class: Insecta
- Order: Lepidoptera
- Family: Drepanidae
- Genus: Tridrepana
- Species: T. finita

Binomial name
- Tridrepana finita Watson, 1957

Species of hook-tip moth

Tridrepana finita is a moth in the family Drepanidae. It was described by Watson in 1957. It is found in China (Sichuan, Yunnan, Tibet).

Adults are similar to Tridrepana sadana and Tridrepana rubromarginata.
