= Tridrepana subadelpha =

Scientific classification
- Domain: Eukaryota
- Kingdom: Animalia
- Phylum: Arthropoda
- Class: Insecta
- Order: Lepidoptera
- Family: Drepanidae
- Genus: Tridrepana
- Species: T. subadelpha

Binomial name
- Tridrepana subadelpha Song, Xue & Han, 2011

Species of hook-tip moth

Tridrepana subadelpha is a moth in the family Drepanidae. It was described by Song, Xue and Han in 2011. It is found in Yunnan, China.

The length of the forewings is about 13 mm.

== Etymology ==
The species name refers to the similarity of its genitalia to Tridrepana adelpha and is derived from the Latin prefix sub- and the species name adelpha.
