= Tridrepana hainana =

Scientific classification
- Domain: Eukaryota
- Kingdom: Animalia
- Phylum: Arthropoda
- Class: Insecta
- Order: Lepidoptera
- Family: Drepanidae
- Genus: Tridrepana
- Species: T. hainana

Binomial name
- Tridrepana hainana Chu & Wang, 1988

Species of hook-tip moth

Tridrepana hainana is a moth in the family Drepanidae. It was described by Hong-Fu Chu and Lin-Yao Wang in 1988. It is found in Hainan, China.

Adults are similar to Tridrepana crocea, but can be distinguished by the male genitalic features.
