= Tridrepana aurorina =

Scientific classification
- Kingdom: Animalia
- Phylum: Arthropoda
- Class: Insecta
- Order: Lepidoptera
- Family: Drepanidae
- Genus: Tridrepana
- Species: T. aurorina

Binomial name
- Tridrepana aurorina Bryk, 1943

Synonyms
- Tridrepana glaciata aurorina Bryk, 1943

Species of hook-tip moth

Tridrepana aurorina is a moth in the family Drepanidae. It was described by Felix Bryk in 1943. It is found in north-eastern Myanmar.

The wingspan is about 31.2-36.2 mm. Adults are similar to Tridrepana sadana, but lack dark scales.
