= Tridrepana septempunctata =

Scientific classification
- Domain: Eukaryota
- Kingdom: Animalia
- Phylum: Arthropoda
- Class: Insecta
- Order: Lepidoptera
- Family: Drepanidae
- Genus: Tridrepana
- Species: T. septempunctata

Binomial name
- Tridrepana septempunctata Warren, 1896

Species of hook-tip moth

Tridrepana septempunctata is a moth in the family Drepanidae. It was described by Warren in 1896. It is found in Assam in India and on Sumatra in Indonesia.

The wingspan is about 30.2-34.6 mm.

== Subspecies ==
- Tridrepana septempunctata septempunctata (India: Assam)
- Tridrepana septempunctata nitidior Watson, 1957 (Sumatra)
