= Faristenia polemica =

Scientific classification
- Kingdom: Animalia
- Phylum: Arthropoda
- Class: Insecta
- Order: Lepidoptera
- Family: Gelechiidae
- Genus: Faristenia
- Species: F. polemica

Binomial name
- Faristenia polemica (Meyrick, 1935)

Synonyms
- Chelaria polemica Meyrick, 1935; Hypatima polemica

Species of moth

Faristenia polemica is a moth in the family Gelechiidae. It is found in India (Bengal) and Thailand.

The length of the forewings is about 14 mm.

The larvae feed on Michelia champaca.
