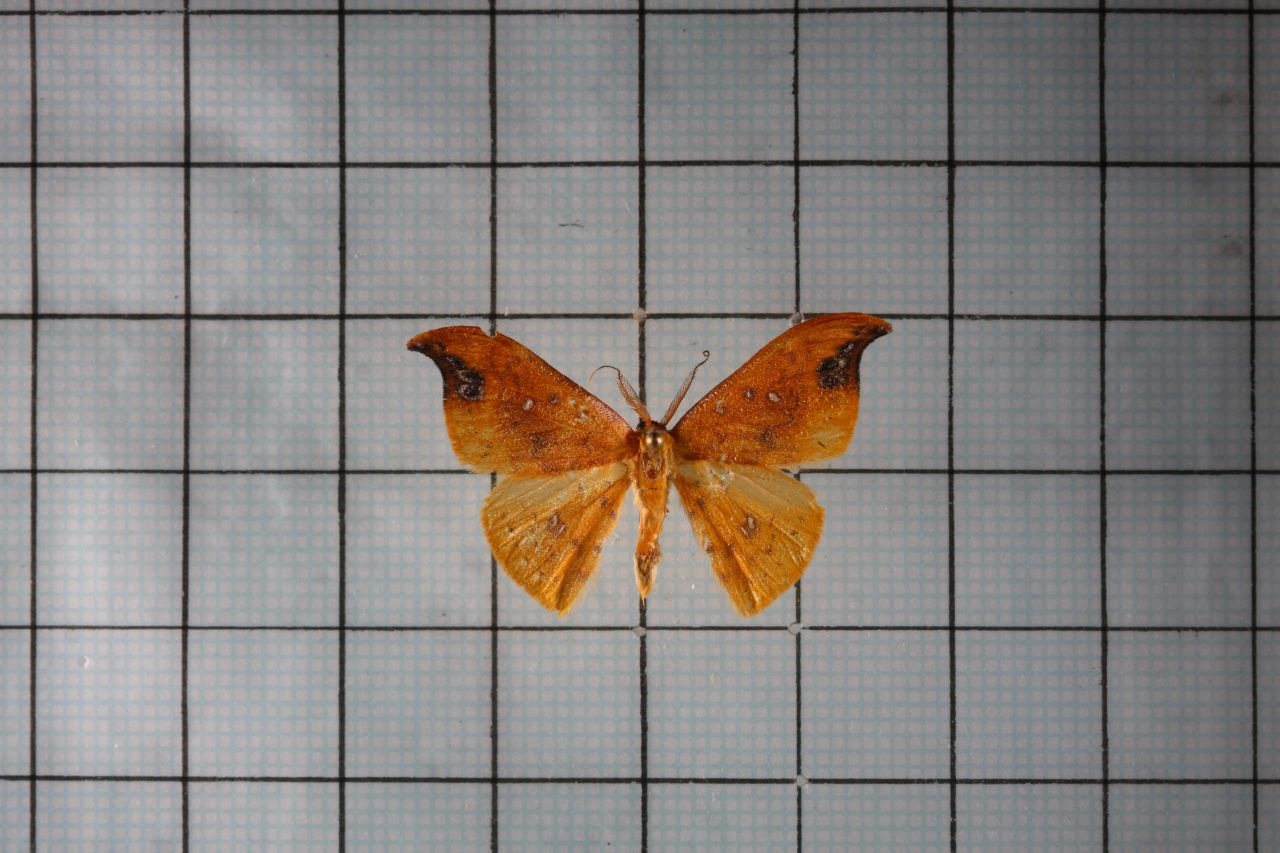

Scientific classification
- Domain: Eukaryota
- Kingdom: Animalia
- Phylum: Arthropoda
- Class: Insecta
- Order: Lepidoptera
- Family: Drepanidae
- Genus: Tridrepana
- Species: T. unispina

Binomial name
- Tridrepana unispina Watson, 1957

= Tridrepana unispina =

Species of hook-tip moth

Tridrepana unispina is a moth in the family Drepanidae. It is found in China (Fujian, Guangdong, Chongqing, Sichuan, Yunnan), Japan and Taiwan.

The wingspan is 27–42 mm. Adults are on wing in June.

The larvae feed on the leaves of Castanopsis formosana.
