= Tridrepana olivacea =

Scientific classification
- Domain: Eukaryota
- Kingdom: Animalia
- Phylum: Arthropoda
- Class: Insecta
- Order: Lepidoptera
- Family: Drepanidae
- Genus: Tridrepana
- Species: T. olivacea

Binomial name
- Tridrepana olivacea (Warren, 1922)

Synonyms
- Iridrepana olivacea Warren, 1922; Tridrepana fulvata ab. olivacea; Iridrepana semirufa Warren, 1922; Tridrepana semirufata; Iridrepana semirufa elegans Warren, 1922; Iridrepana semirufa ab. diluta Warren, 1922; Tridrepana tristigma Warren, 1922

Species of hook-tip moth

Tridrepana olivacea is a moth in the family Drepanidae. It was described by Warren in 1922. It is found in New Guinea, extending to Goodenough Island and the Bismarck Archipelago.

The wingspan is about 34–41 mm for males and about 44.5 mm for females.

== Subspecies ==
- Tridrepana olivacea olivacea
- Tridrepana olivacea crocata Watson, 1957 (Rook Island and New Britain)
