= Tridrepana sera =

Scientific classification
- Domain: Eukaryota
- Kingdom: Animalia
- Phylum: Arthropoda
- Class: Insecta
- Order: Lepidoptera
- Family: Drepanidae
- Genus: Tridrepana
- Species: T. sera

Binomial name
- Tridrepana sera (Warren, 1896)

Synonyms
- Drepana sera Warren, 1896; Iridrepana sera; Iridrepana sera ab. suffusa Warren, 1922

Species of hook-tip moth

Tridrepana sera is a moth in the family Drepanidae. It was first described by William Warren in 1896. It is found on Fergusson Island and in New Guinea.

The wingspan is about 27–31.6 mm for males and 33.6-36.8 mm for females. The forewings are dull yellow with obscure markings. There is a rufous spot on the upper vertical arm of the discocellular, and a white rufous-edged spot at the lower angle of the cell, as well as a rufous curved line near the base, plainest on the inner margin. There is also a rufous outer line from the centre of costa to middle of the inner margin, strongly outcurved and thickened opposite the cell, then oblique inwards. The submarginal line is curved and consists of blackish spots between the veins, that are most distinct and swollen opposite the cell. The apical region is suffused with rufous. The hindwings have the three lines as in the forewings and a rufous blotch at the end of the cell.
