= Faristenia jumbongae =

Scientific classification
- Domain: Eukaryota
- Kingdom: Animalia
- Phylum: Arthropoda
- Class: Insecta
- Order: Lepidoptera
- Family: Gelechiidae
- Genus: Faristenia
- Species: F. jumbongae

Binomial name
- Faristenia jumbongae Park, 1993

Species of moth

Faristenia jumbongae is a moth in the family Gelechiidae. It is found in Korea and Japan.

The wingspan is 12–14.5 mm.
