= Tridrepana acuta =

Scientific classification
- Domain: Eukaryota
- Kingdom: Animalia
- Phylum: Arthropoda
- Class: Insecta
- Order: Lepidoptera
- Family: Drepanidae
- Genus: Tridrepana
- Species: T. acuta

Binomial name
- Tridrepana acuta Watson, 1957

Species of hook-tip moth

Tridrepana acuta is a moth in the family Drepanidae. It was described by Allan Watson in 1957. It is found in Sri Lanka and possibly southern India.

== Description ==
The wingspan is about 32-35.6 mm. The mid and hind tibia have a terminal pairs of spurs. The antennae are bipectinate (comb like on both sides) in the male, the branches long. Palpi upturned, reaching vertex of head. In the male, the frons is red. Head, thorax and abdomen ochreous. Forewing yellow and costa is reddish. The area below the medial two-thirds of costa suffused with red brown. An indistinct dark spot on discocellulars. Outer margin from below apex to near outer angle red brown. Hindwing yellow, the cilia red brown. Underside suffused with crimson.
