= Tridrepana aequinota =

Scientific classification
- Domain: Eukaryota
- Kingdom: Animalia
- Phylum: Arthropoda
- Class: Insecta
- Order: Lepidoptera
- Family: Drepanidae
- Genus: Tridrepana
- Species: T. aequinota

Binomial name
- Tridrepana aequinota Watson, 1957

Species of hook-tip moth

Tridrepana aequinota is a moth in the family Drepanidae. It was described by Allan Watson in 1957. It is found on Buru in Indonesia.
