= Tridrepana spatulata =

Scientific classification
- Domain: Eukaryota
- Kingdom: Animalia
- Phylum: Arthropoda
- Class: Insecta
- Order: Lepidoptera
- Family: Drepanidae
- Genus: Tridrepana
- Species: T. spatulata

Binomial name
- Tridrepana spatulata Watson, 1957

Species of hook-tip moth

Tridrepana spatulata is a moth in the family Drepanidae. It was described by Allan Watson in 1957. It is found on Luzon and Mindanao in the Philippines.

The wingspan is about 31–35 mm for males and about 38.5 mm for females.
