= Tridrepana fulva =

Scientific classification
- Kingdom: Animalia
- Phylum: Arthropoda
- Class: Insecta
- Order: Lepidoptera
- Family: Drepanidae
- Genus: Tridrepana
- Species: T. fulva

Binomial name
- Tridrepana fulva (Hampson, [1893])

Synonyms
- Drepana fulva Hampson, 1893; Iridrepana fulva

Species of hook-tip moth

Tridrepana fulva is a moth in the family Drepanidae. It was described by George Hampson in 1893. It is found in Tibet in China, Sikkim in India and Nepal.

The wingspan is about 44 mm. Adults are bright fulvous yellow, the forewings with traces of two dark specks beyond the cell in the interspaces between veins 2 and 4. The hindwings are uniform fulvous yellow.
