= Faristenia angustivalvata =

Scientific classification
- Kingdom: Animalia
- Phylum: Arthropoda
- Clade: Pancrustacea
- Class: Insecta
- Order: Lepidoptera
- Family: Gelechiidae
- Genus: Faristenia
- Species: F. angustivalvata

Binomial name
- Faristenia angustivalvata Li & Zheng, 1998

Species of moth

Faristenia angustivalvata is a moth in the family Gelechiidae. It is found in China (Jiangxi).
