= Faristenia acerella =

Scientific classification
- Kingdom: Animalia
- Phylum: Arthropoda
- Class: Insecta
- Order: Lepidoptera
- Family: Gelechiidae
- Genus: Faristenia
- Species: F. acerella

Binomial name
- Faristenia acerella Ponomarenko, 1991

Species of moth

Faristenia acerella is a moth in the family Gelechiidae. It is found in the Russian Far East and Korea.

The wingspan is 13.5-14.5 mm.

The larvae feed on Acer ginnala.
