= Faristenia hirowatarii =

Scientific classification
- Kingdom: Animalia
- Phylum: Arthropoda
- Clade: Pancrustacea
- Class: Insecta
- Order: Lepidoptera
- Family: Gelechiidae
- Genus: Faristenia
- Species: F. hirowatarii

Binomial name
- Faristenia hirowatarii Ueda, 2012

Species of moth

Faristenia hirowatarii is a moth in the family Gelechiidae. It is found in Japan (Honshu). It is named for Toshiya Hirowatari from the Osaka Prefecture University who collected the holotype.

The length of the forewings is 5.6–6.9 mm (0.22–0.27 in) for males and 5.7–7.2 mm (0.22–0.28 in) for females. The larval host plan is unknown but a pupa was collected from Lindera umbellata.
