= Tridrepana bicuspidata =

Scientific classification
- Domain: Eukaryota
- Kingdom: Animalia
- Phylum: Arthropoda
- Class: Insecta
- Order: Lepidoptera
- Family: Drepanidae
- Genus: Tridrepana
- Species: T. bicuspidata

Binomial name
- Tridrepana bicuspidata Song, Xue & Han, 2011

Species of hook-tip moth

Tridrepana bicuspidata is a moth in the family Drepanidae. It was first described by Song, Xue and Han in 2011. It is found in Hainan, China.
