= Tridrepana thermopasta =

Scientific classification
- Kingdom: Animalia
- Phylum: Arthropoda
- Class: Insecta
- Order: Lepidoptera
- Family: Drepanidae
- Genus: Tridrepana
- Species: T. thermopasta

Binomial name
- Tridrepana thermopasta (Hampson, 1914)

Synonyms
- Drepana thermopasta Hampson, 1914

Species of hook-tip moth

Tridrepana thermopasta is a moth in the family Drepanidae. It was described by George Hampson in 1914. It is found in south-western China.

The wingspan is about 28 mm. The forewings are orange, thickly irrorated (sprinkled) with rufous and with a rufous discoidal point, as well as traces of a sinuous rufous antemedial line and of two similar postmedial lines. There is a patch of rufous suffusion on the terminal area below the apex. The hindwings are orange, the basal and inner areas irrorated with rufous and with traces of an obliquely curved antemedial line and of postmedial and subterminal lines on the inner area only.
