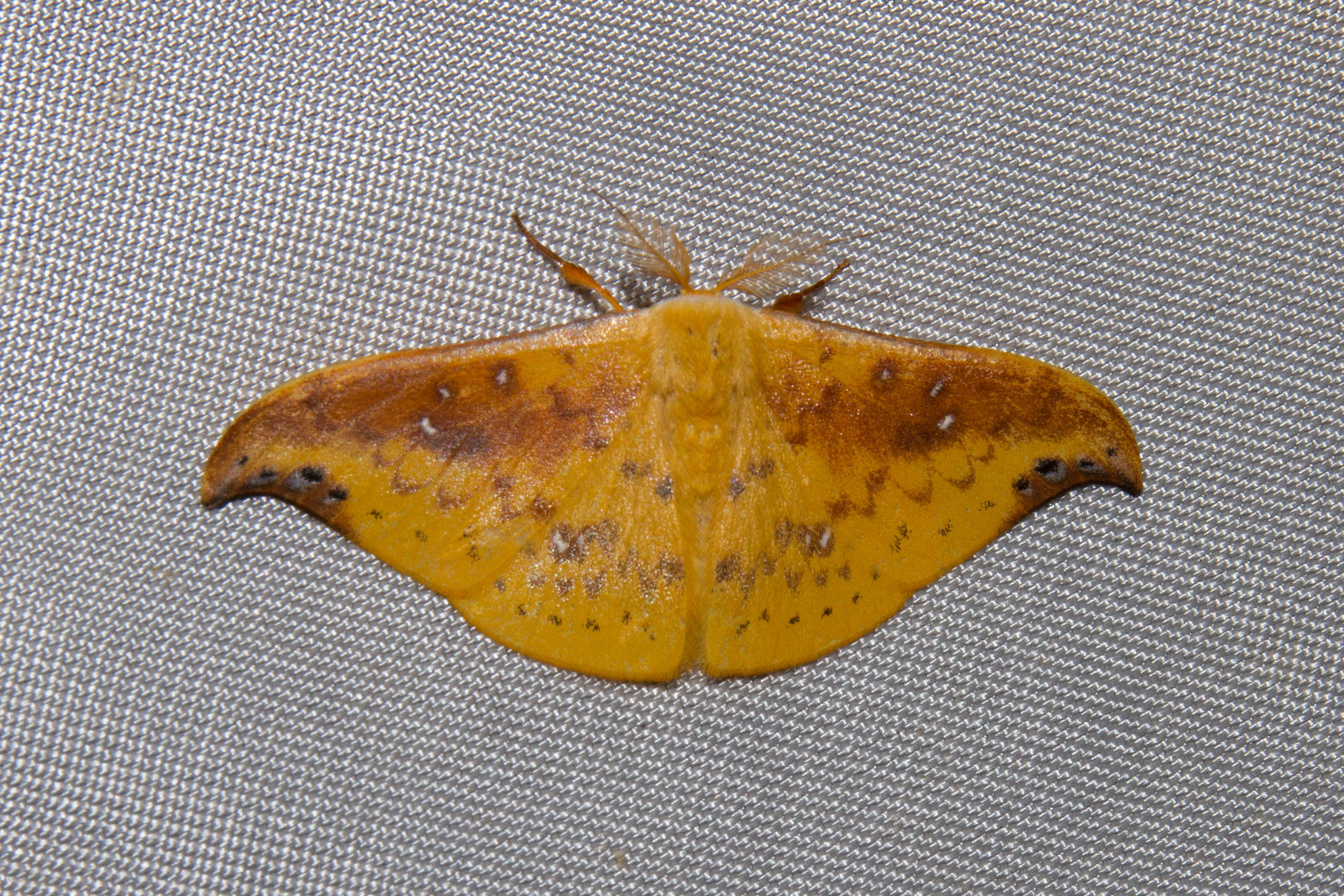

Scientific classification
- Domain: Eukaryota
- Kingdom: Animalia
- Phylum: Arthropoda
- Class: Insecta
- Order: Lepidoptera
- Family: Drepanidae
- Genus: Tridrepana
- Species: T. examplata

Binomial name
- Tridrepana examplata (Warren, 1922)

Synonyms
- Iridrepana examplata Warren, 1922

= Tridrepana examplata =

Species of hook-tip moth

Tridrepana examplata is a moth in the family Drepanidae. It was described by Warren in 1922. It is widely distributed in New Guinea, where it is especially common in mountainous areas.

The wingspan is about 38-46.2 mm for males and 41.2–51 mm for females.
