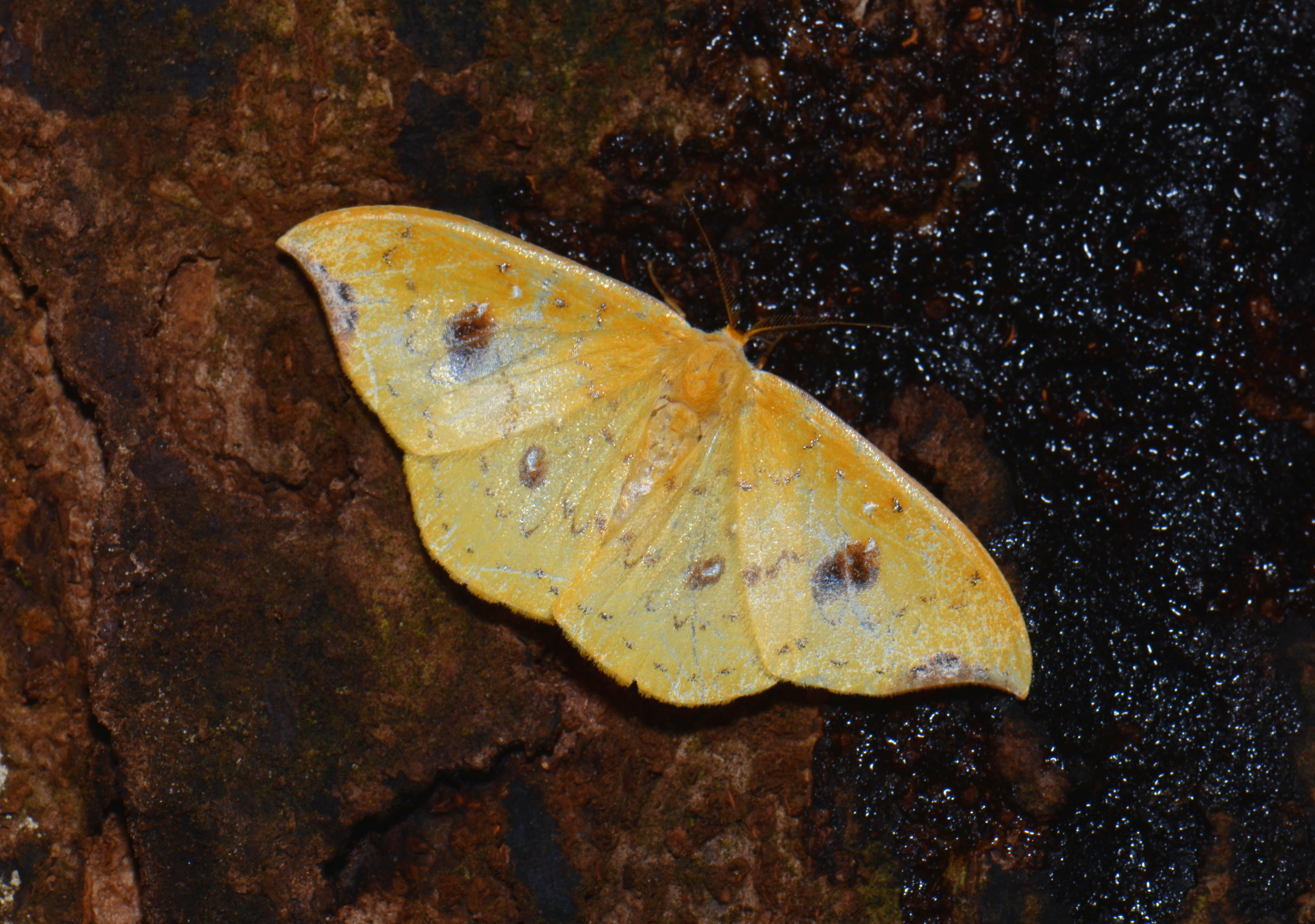

Scientific classification
- Kingdom: Animalia
- Phylum: Arthropoda
- Class: Insecta
- Order: Lepidoptera
- Family: Drepanidae
- Genus: Tridrepana
- Species: T. fulvata

Binomial name
- Tridrepana fulvata (Snellen, 1876)

Synonyms
- Drepana fulvata Snellen, 1876; Platypteryx fulvata

= Tridrepana fulvata =

Species of hook-tip moth

Tridrepana fulvata is a moth in the family Drepanidae. It was described by Snellen in 1876. It is found in China, India, Myanmar, Malaysia and Indonesia.

The wingspan is 30–38 mm for males and 32.5–45 mm for females.

The larvae feed on Nephelium species.

== Subspecies ==
- Tridrepana fulvata fulvata
- Tridrepana fulvata brevis Watson, 1957 (India, Myanmar, China: Shanghai, Fujian, Guangdong, Hainan, Hong Kong, Yunnan)
- Tridrepana fulvata celebica Watson, 1961 (Sulawesi)
