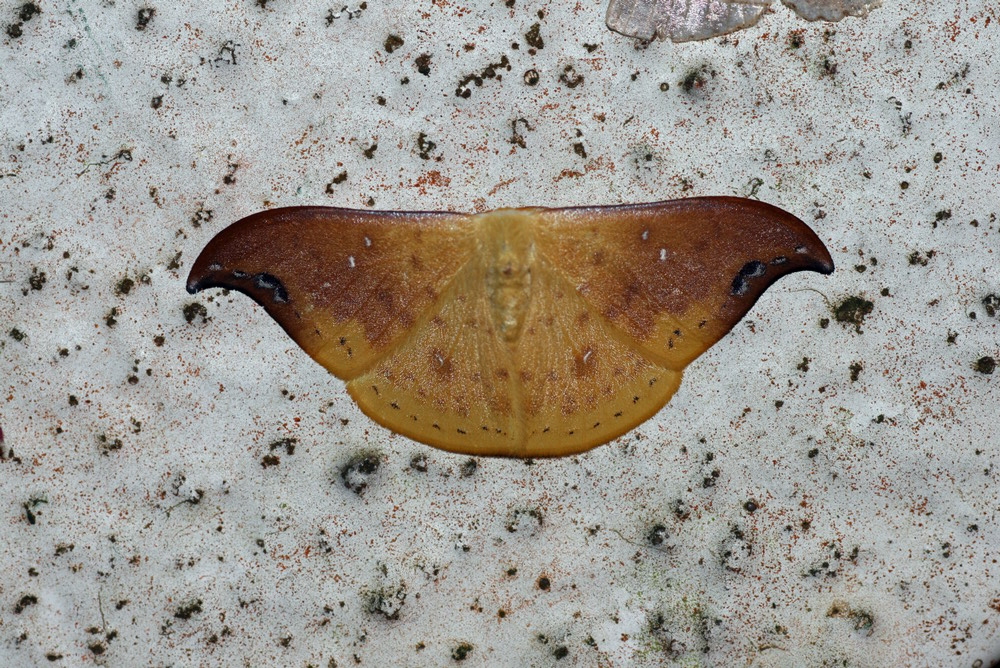

Scientific classification
- Domain: Eukaryota
- Kingdom: Animalia
- Phylum: Arthropoda
- Class: Insecta
- Order: Lepidoptera
- Family: Drepanidae
- Genus: Tridrepana
- Species: T. albonotata

Binomial name
- Tridrepana albonotata (Moore, 1879)

Synonyms
- Drepana albonotata Moore, 1879; Callidrepana ochrea Butler, 1886; Iridrepana septempunctata pervasata Warren, 1922; Iridrepana glaciana Warren, 1922; Agnidra ferrea Hampson, 1892

= Tridrepana albonotata =

Species of hook-tip moth

Tridrepana albonotata is a moth of the family Drepanidae described by Frederic Moore in 1879. It is found in India, Nepal, Vietnam, Sri Lanka, Peninsular Malaysia, Sumatra, Borneo, Java, Bali and Sulawesi.

== Description ==
In the female, the body is chestnut brown with a purplish tinge. Forewings with indistinct maculate antemedial and postmedial fuscous bands. Two white dark-outlines specks present at end of cell. Traces of a submarginal series of dark specks. A dark blotch on outer margin below the apex. Hindwings with the markings similar. One white speck found at end of cell.

== Subspecies ==
- Tridrepana albonotata albonotata (India, Nepal, Vietnam)
- Tridrepana albonotata ferrea (Hampson, 1892) (Sri Lanka)
- Tridrepana albonotata angusta Watson, 1957 (Peninsular Malaysia, Sumatra, Borneo)
- Tridrepana albonotata rotunda Watson, 1957 (Java, Bali)
- Tridrepana albonotata celebesensis Watson, 1957 (Sulawesi)
