= Tridrepana obliquitaenia =

Scientific classification
- Domain: Eukaryota
- Kingdom: Animalia
- Phylum: Arthropoda
- Class: Insecta
- Order: Lepidoptera
- Family: Drepanidae
- Genus: Tridrepana
- Species: T. obliquitaenia

Binomial name
- Tridrepana obliquitaenia (Warren, 1922)

Synonyms
- Iridrepana obliquitaenia Warren, 1922

Species of hook-tip moth

Tridrepana obliquitaenia is a moth in the family Drepanidae. It was described by Warren in 1922. It is widely distributed in New Guinea.

The wingspan is about 35.2-41.8 mm for males.
