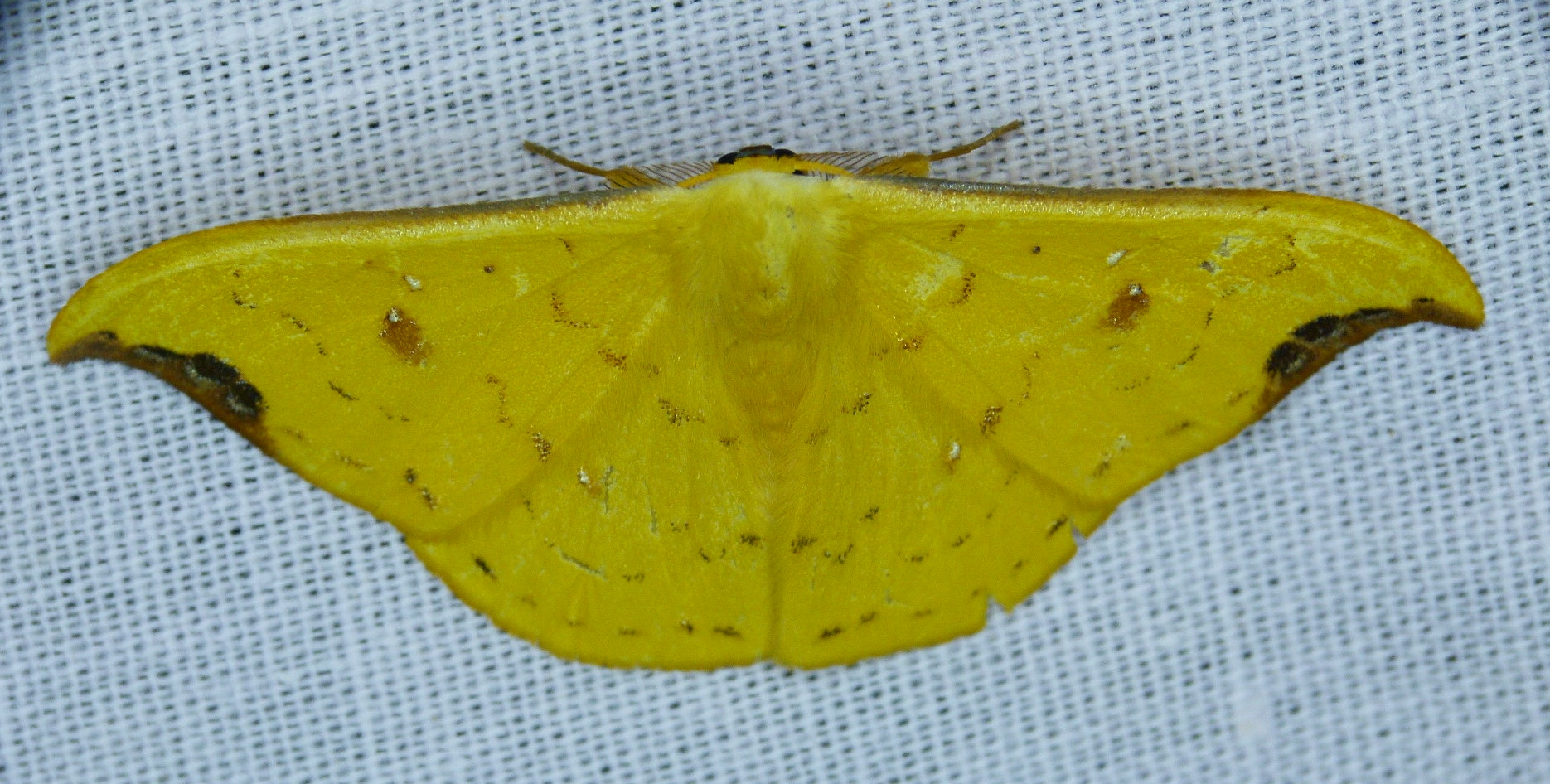
- Tridrepana species from India

Scientific classification
- Domain: Eukaryota
- Kingdom: Animalia
- Phylum: Arthropoda
- Class: Insecta
- Order: Lepidoptera
- Family: Drepanidae
- Tribe: Drepanini
- Genus: Tridrepana; Swinhoe, 1895

Synonyms
- Konjikia Nakano, 1917; Iridrepana Warren, 1922

= Tridrepana =

Moth genus in family Drepanidae

Tridrepana is a genus of moths belonging to the subfamily Drepaninae.

== Species ==
- Tridrepana acuta Watson, 1957
- Tridrepana adelpha Swinhoe, 1905
- Tridrepana aequinota Watson, 1957
- Tridrepana albonotata (Moore, 1879)
- Tridrepana argentistriga Warren, 1896
- Tridrepana arikana (Matsumura, 1921)
- Tridrepana aurorina Bryk, 1943
- Tridrepana bicuspidata Song, Xue & Han, 2011
- Tridrepana bifurcata Chen, 1985
- Tridrepana brunneilinea Holloway, 1998
- Tridrepana cervina (Warren, 1922)
- Tridrepana crocea (Leech, 1889)
- Tridrepana examplata (Warren, 1922)
- Tridrepana finita Watson, 1957
- Tridrepana flava (Moore, 1879)
- Tridrepana fulva (Hampson, [1893])
- Tridrepana fulvata (Snellen, 1876)
- Tridrepana hainana Chu & Wang, 1988
- Tridrepana hypha Chu & Wang, 1988
- Tridrepana lunulata (Butler, 1887)
- Tridrepana maculosa Watson, 1957
- Tridrepana marginata Watson, 1957
- Tridrepana mediata (Warren, 1922)
- Tridrepana melliflua (Warren, 1922)
- Tridrepana microcrocea Gaede, 1914
- Tridrepana obliquitaenia (Warren, 1922)
- Tridrepana obscura Watson, 1957
- Tridrepana olivacea (Warren, 1922)
- Tridrepana postica (Moore, 1879)
- Tridrepana rectifascia Watson, 1957
- Tridrepana rubromarginata (Leech, 1898)
- Tridrepana sadana (Moore, 1865)
- Tridrepana septempunctata Warren, 1896
- Tridrepana sera (Warren, 1896)
- Tridrepana sigma Watson, 1957
- Tridrepana spatulata Watson, 1957
- Tridrepana subadelpha Song, Xue & Han, 2011
- Tridrepana subtusmaculata Gaede, 1933
- Tridrepana subunispina Song, Xue & Han, 2011
- Tridrepana thermopasta (Hampson, 1914)
- Tridrepana trialba Watson, 1957
- Tridrepana unispina Watson, 1957
