= Faristenia maritimella =

Scientific classification
- Kingdom: Animalia
- Phylum: Arthropoda
- Class: Insecta
- Order: Lepidoptera
- Family: Gelechiidae
- Genus: Faristenia
- Species: F. maritimella

Binomial name
- Faristenia maritimella Ponomarenko, 1991

Species of moth

Faristenia maritimella is a moth in the family Gelechiidae. It is found in the Russian Far East.
