= Faristenia nakatanii =

Scientific classification
- Kingdom: Animalia
- Phylum: Arthropoda
- Clade: Pancrustacea
- Class: Insecta
- Order: Lepidoptera
- Family: Gelechiidae
- Genus: Faristenia
- Species: F. nakatanii

Binomial name
- Faristenia nakatanii Ueda, 2012

Species of moth

Faristenia nakatanii is a moth in the family Gelechiidae. It is found in Japan (Kyushu, the Ryukyu Islands). It is named for Yukinobu Nakatani from the National Institute for Agro-Environmental Sciences (Japan) who collected the holotype.

The length of the forewings is 5.6–6 mm (0.22–0.24 in) for males and 5.6–6.3 mm (0.22–0.25 in) for females. The larvae feed on Distylium racemosum.
