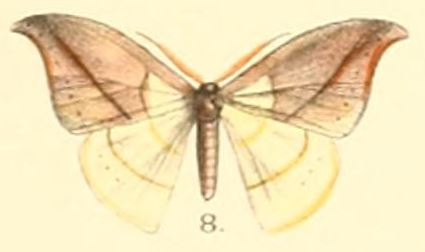

Scientific classification
- Domain: Eukaryota
- Kingdom: Animalia
- Phylum: Arthropoda
- Class: Insecta
- Order: Lepidoptera
- Family: Drepanidae
- Genus: Tridrepana
- Species: T. postica

Binomial name
- Tridrepana postica (Moore, 1879)

Synonyms
- Drepana postica Moore, 1879; Iridrepana postica; Drepana xanthoptera Hampson, 1893; Tridrepana xanthoptera

= Tridrepana postica =

Species of hook-tip moth

Tridrepana postica is a moth in the family Drepanidae. It was described by Frederic Moore in 1879. It is found in north-eastern India and Malaysia.

The wingspan is about 27.4-37.4 mm for males and 35.8-40.2 mm for females.
