= Tridrepana microcrocea =

Scientific classification
- Domain: Eukaryota
- Kingdom: Animalia
- Phylum: Arthropoda
- Class: Insecta
- Order: Lepidoptera
- Family: Drepanidae
- Genus: Tridrepana
- Species: T. microcrocea

Binomial name
- Tridrepana microcrocea Gaede, 1914

Species of hook-tip moth

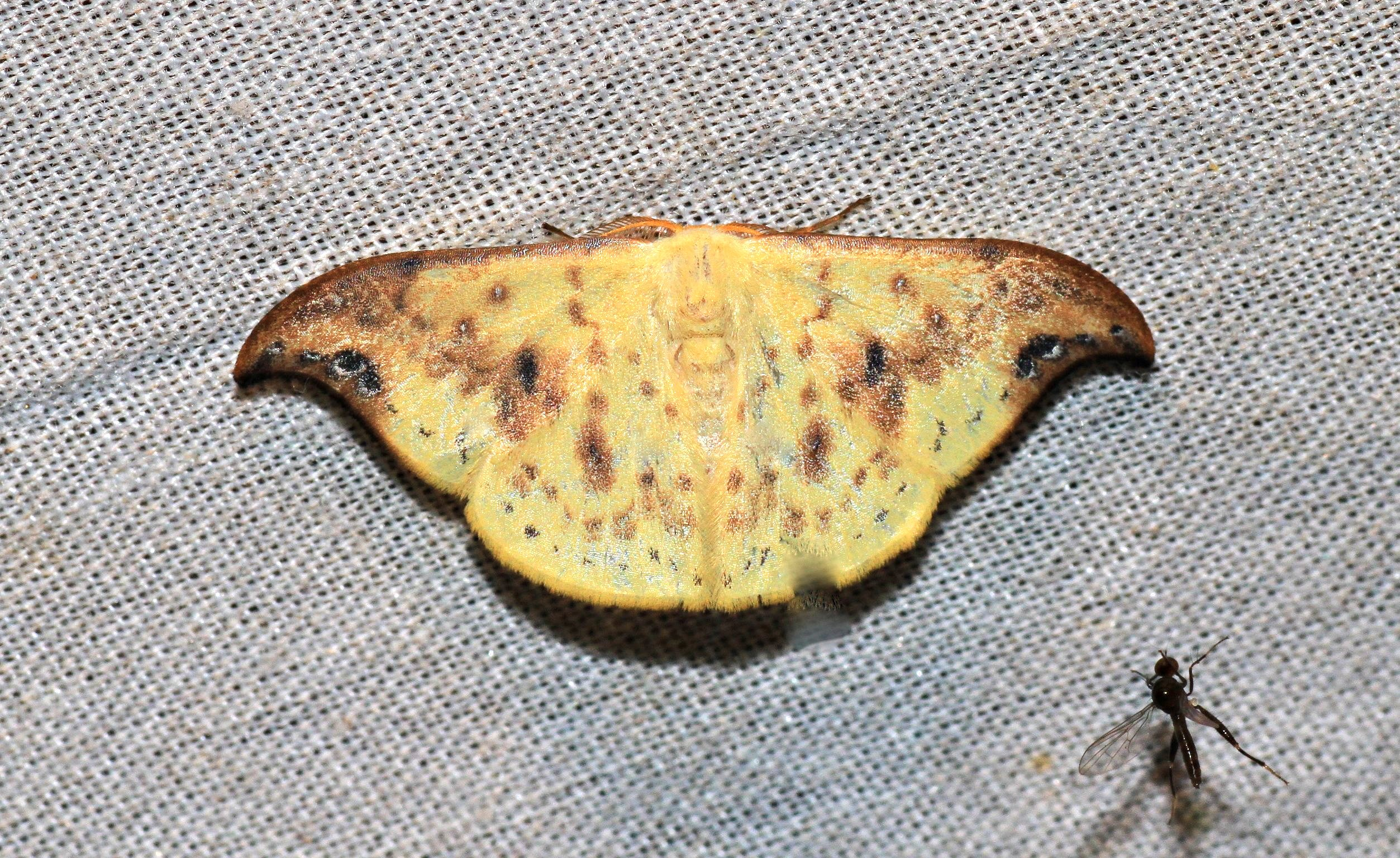
Tridrepana microcrocea

Tridrepana microcrocea is a moth in the family Drepanidae. It was described by Max Gaede in 1914. It is found on Peninsular Malaysia, Sumatra and Borneo.
