= Tridrepana melliflua =

Scientific classification
- Domain: Eukaryota
- Kingdom: Animalia
- Phylum: Arthropoda
- Class: Insecta
- Order: Lepidoptera
- Family: Drepanidae
- Genus: Tridrepana
- Species: T. melliflua

Binomial name
- Tridrepana melliflua (Warren, 1922)

Synonyms
- Iridrepana melliflua Warren, 1922

Species of hook-tip moth

Tridrepana melliflua is a moth in the family Drepanidae. It was described by Warren in 1922. It is found in New Guinea, but probably also occurs in Papua New Guinea.

The wingspan is about 31.8–35.4 mm for males and 35.2–43.8 mm for females.
