= Tridrepana sigma =

Scientific classification
- Domain: Eukaryota
- Kingdom: Animalia
- Phylum: Arthropoda
- Class: Insecta
- Order: Lepidoptera
- Family: Drepanidae
- Genus: Tridrepana
- Species: T. sigma

Binomial name
- Tridrepana sigma Watson, 1957

Species of hook-tip moth

Tridrepana sigma is a moth in the family Drepanidae. It was described by Allan Watson in 1957. It is found in Indonesia (Buru and Ambon Island).

The wingspan is about 36-40.4 mm.
