= Tridrepana obscura =

Scientific classification
- Domain: Eukaryota
- Kingdom: Animalia
- Phylum: Arthropoda
- Class: Insecta
- Order: Lepidoptera
- Family: Drepanidae
- Genus: Tridrepana
- Species: T. obscura

Binomial name
- Tridrepana obscura Watson, 1957

Species of hook-tip moth

Tridrepana obscura is a moth in the family Drepanidae. It was described by Allan Watson in 1957. It is found in Indonesia (Java, Bali, Sumatra).

The wingspan is about 26.2-33.7 mm for males and 34-36.4 mm for females.
