= Tridrepana maculosa =

Scientific classification
- Domain: Eukaryota
- Kingdom: Animalia
- Phylum: Arthropoda
- Class: Insecta
- Order: Lepidoptera
- Family: Drepanidae
- Genus: Tridrepana
- Species: T. maculosa

Binomial name
- Tridrepana maculosa Watson, 1957

Species of hook-tip moth

Tridrepana maculosa is a moth in the family Drepanidae. It was described by Watson in 1957. It is found in the Chinese provinces of Sichuan and Yunnan.

The wingspan is 38.8-46.4 mm for males and 45.6-48.2 mm for females.
