= Faristenia kanazawai =

Scientific classification
- Kingdom: Animalia
- Phylum: Arthropoda
- Clade: Pancrustacea
- Class: Insecta
- Order: Lepidoptera
- Family: Gelechiidae
- Genus: Faristenia
- Species: F. kanazawai

Binomial name
- Faristenia kanazawai Ueda & Ponomarenko, 2000

Species of moth

Faristenia kanazawai is a moth in the family Gelechiidae. It is found in Japan (Honshu). It is named for Itaru Kanazawa from the Osaka Museum of Natural History who collected the holotype.

The length of the forewings is 6.6–7.1 mm (0.26–0.28 in) for males.
