= Tridrepana marginata =

Scientific classification
- Domain: Eukaryota
- Kingdom: Animalia
- Phylum: Arthropoda
- Class: Insecta
- Order: Lepidoptera
- Family: Drepanidae
- Genus: Tridrepana
- Species: T. marginata

Binomial name
- Tridrepana marginata Watson, 1957

Species of hook-tip moth

Tridrepana marginata is a moth in the family Drepanidae. It was described by Watson in 1957. It is found in Yunnan, China.

The wingspan is 27-32.2 mm for males and 30.2–39 mm for females.
