= Tridrepana subunispina =

Scientific classification
- Domain: Eukaryota
- Kingdom: Animalia
- Phylum: Arthropoda
- Class: Insecta
- Order: Lepidoptera
- Family: Drepanidae
- Genus: Tridrepana
- Species: T. subunispina

Binomial name
- Tridrepana subunispina Song, Xue & Han, 2011

Species of hook-tip moth

Tridrepana subunispina is a moth in the family Drepanidae. It was described by Song, Xue and Han in 2011. It is found in Yunnan, China.
