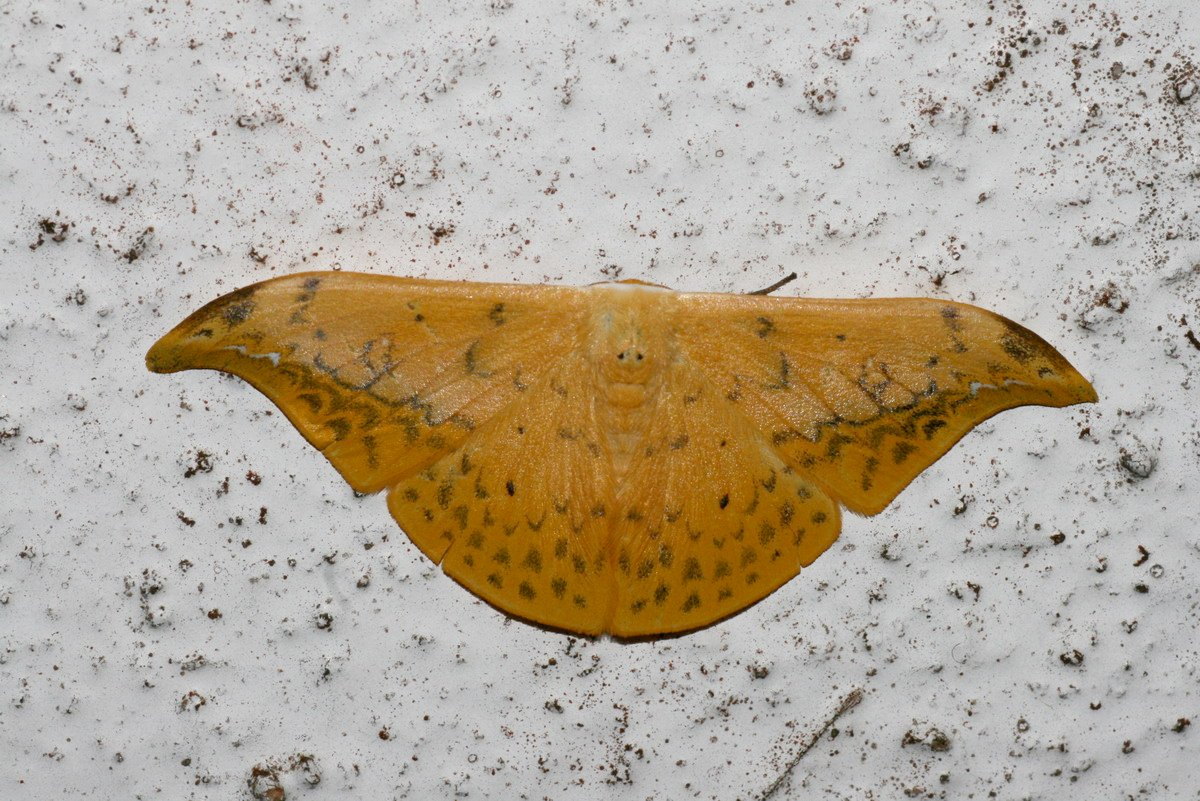

Scientific classification
- Domain: Eukaryota
- Kingdom: Animalia
- Phylum: Arthropoda
- Class: Insecta
- Order: Lepidoptera
- Family: Drepanidae
- Genus: Tridrepana
- Species: T. flava

Binomial name
- Tridrepana flava (Moore, 1879)

Synonyms
- Drepana flava Moore, 1879; Albara flava; Callidrepana flava; Iridrepana flava

= Tridrepana flava =

Species of hook-tip moth

Tridrepana flava is a moth of the family Drepanidae. It is found in the north-eastern parts of the Himalaya, China, Taiwan, Sundaland, and Sulawesi.

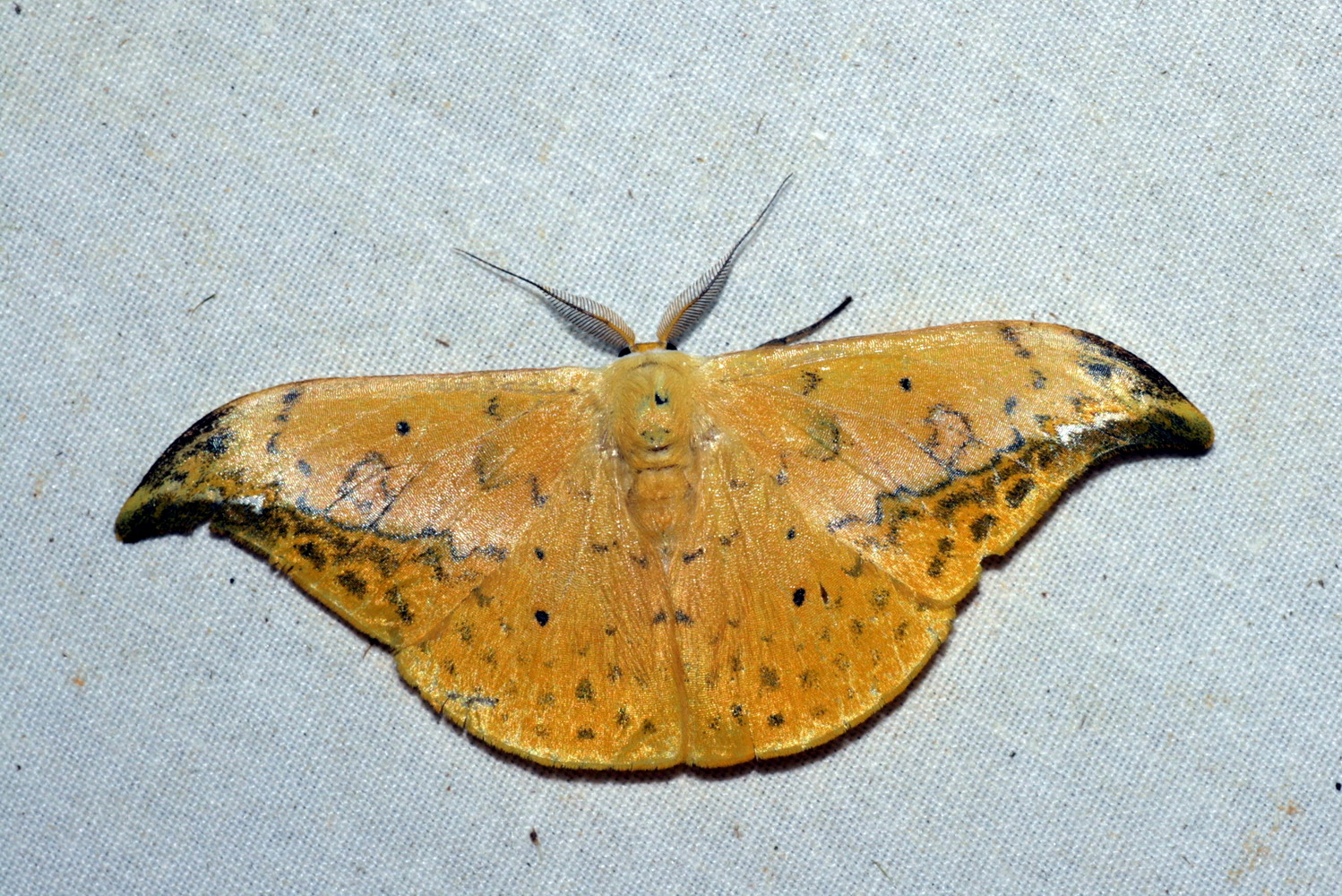

The larvae feed on the leaves of Eurya japonica. Mature larvae curl a leaf margin and fix it with silk to pupate inside.

== Subspecies ==
- Tridrepana flava flava (India, north-eastern Himalaya, Taiwan, China: Jiangxi, Fujian, Guangdong, Hainan, Guangxi, Yunnan)
- Tridrepana flava contracta Watson, 1957 (Sundaland)
- Tridrepana flava unita Watson, 1957 (Sulawesi)
