= Faristenia =

Scientific classification
- Kingdom: Animalia
- Phylum: Arthropoda
- Class: Insecta
- Order: Lepidoptera
- Family: Gelechiidae
- Tribe: Chelariini
- Genus: Faristenia; Ponomarenko, 1991

Genus of moths

Faristenia is a genus of moths in the family Gelechiidae.

== Species ==
- Faristenia acerella Ponomarenko, 1991
- Faristenia angustivalvata Li & Zheng, 1998
- Faristenia atrimaculata Park, 1993
- Faristenia circulicaudata Li & Zheng, 1998
- Faristenia cornutivalvaris Li & Zheng, 1998
- Faristenia furtumella Ponomarenko, 1991
- Faristenia geminisignella Ponomarenko, 1991
- Faristenia hirowatarii Ueda, 2012
- Faristenia impenicilla Li & Zheng, 1998
- Faristenia jumbongae Park, 1993
- Faristenia kanazawai Ueda & Ponomarenko, 2000
- Faristenia kangxianensis Li & Zheng, 1998
- Faristenia maritimella Ponomarenko, 1991
- Faristenia medimaculata Li & Zheng, 1998
- Faristenia mukurossivora Ueda & Ponomarenko, 2000
- Faristenia nakatanii Ueda, 2012
- Faristenia nemoriella Ponomarenko, 1998
- Faristenia obliqua Park, Lee & Lee, 2000
- Faristenia omelkoi Ponomarenko, 1991
- Faristenia pallida Li & Zheng, 1998
- Faristenia polemica (Meyrick, 1935)
- Faristenia praemaculata (Meyrick, 1931)
- Faristenia quercivora Ponomarenko, 1991
- Faristenia tamarinda Bippus, 2020
- Faristenia triangula Li & Zheng, 1998
- Faristenia ussuriella Ponomarenko, 1991
- Faristenia wuyiensis Li & Zheng, 1998
