= Tridrepana argentistriga =

Scientific classification
- Domain: Eukaryota
- Kingdom: Animalia
- Phylum: Arthropoda
- Class: Insecta
- Order: Lepidoptera
- Family: Drepanidae
- Genus: Tridrepana
- Species: T. argentistriga

Binomial name
- Tridrepana argentistriga Warren, 1896

Synonyms
- Iridrepana argentistriga Warren, 1922

Species of hook-tip moth

Tridrepana argentistriga is a moth in the family Drepanidae. It was described by Warren in 1896. It is found in Malaysia, Singapore, Indonesia (Borneo, Sulawesi), Myanmar and Hainan, China.

The wingspan is about 32 mm. The forewings are yellow, the outer half with pale red-brown suffusion. There is a dark red-brown line from before the apex to the middle of the inner margin, meeting a vertical line which becomes obsolete at the median. There is also an irregularly wavy red-brown submarginal line, its upper half edged externally with silvery white. The hindwings are yellow, with an oblique antemedial line and a fine postmedial line. There is an oval silvery spot at the lower end of the discocellular, and a fine linear spot at the upper end.

== Subspecies ==
- Tridrepana argentistriga argentistriga
- Tridrepana argentistriga brevilinea Watson, 1957 (Sulawesi)
