= Tridrepana cervina =

Scientific classification
- Domain: Eukaryota
- Kingdom: Animalia
- Phylum: Arthropoda
- Class: Insecta
- Order: Lepidoptera
- Family: Drepanidae
- Genus: Tridrepana
- Species: T. cervina

Binomial name
- Tridrepana cervina (Warren, 1922)

Synonyms
- Iridrepana cervina Warren, 1922

Species of hook-tip moth

Tridrepana cervina is a moth in the family Drepanidae. It was described by Warren in 1922. It is found in New Guinea.
