= Faristenia atrimaculata =

Scientific classification
- Domain: Eukaryota
- Kingdom: Animalia
- Phylum: Arthropoda
- Class: Insecta
- Order: Lepidoptera
- Family: Gelechiidae
- Genus: Faristenia
- Species: F. atrimaculata

Binomial name
- Faristenia atrimaculata Park, 1993

Species of moth

Faristenia atrimaculata is a moth in the family Gelechiidae. It is found in Korea.

The wingspan is 14–16 mm.
