= Tridrepana trialba =

Scientific classification
- Domain: Eukaryota
- Kingdom: Animalia
- Phylum: Arthropoda
- Class: Insecta
- Order: Lepidoptera
- Family: Drepanidae
- Genus: Tridrepana
- Species: T. trialba

Binomial name
- Tridrepana trialba Watson, 1957

Species of hook-tip moth

Tridrepana trialba is a moth in the family Drepanidae. It was described by Allan Watson in 1957. It is found on Sulawesi in Indonesia.

The wingspan is about 27.6–35 mm for males and 37.6-38.8 mm for females. Adults can be distinguished from related species by a white (not brown) mid-cell spot on the upperside of the forewings.
