= Faristenia furtumella =

Scientific classification
- Kingdom: Animalia
- Phylum: Arthropoda
- Clade: Pancrustacea
- Class: Insecta
- Order: Lepidoptera
- Family: Gelechiidae
- Genus: Faristenia
- Species: F. furtumella

Binomial name
- Faristenia furtumella Ponomarenko, 1991

Species of moth

Faristenia furtumella is a moth in the family Gelechiidae. It is found in the Russian Far East, Korea and Japan (Honshu).

The larvae feed on Quercus mongolica, the Mongolian oak.
