= Faristenia kangxianensis =

Scientific classification
- Kingdom: Animalia
- Phylum: Arthropoda
- Clade: Pancrustacea
- Class: Insecta
- Order: Lepidoptera
- Family: Gelechiidae
- Genus: Faristenia
- Species: F. kangxianensis

Binomial name
- Faristenia kangxianensis Li & Zheng, 1998

Species of moth

Faristenia kangxianensis is a moth in the family Gelechiidae. It is found in China (Gansu).
