= Faristenia omelkoi =

Scientific classification
- Kingdom: Animalia
- Phylum: Arthropoda
- Class: Insecta
- Order: Lepidoptera
- Family: Gelechiidae
- Genus: Faristenia
- Species: F. omelkoi

Binomial name
- Faristenia omelkoi Ponomarenko, 1991

Synonyms
- Faristenia nigriella Park, 1993

Species of moth

Faristenia omelkoi is a moth in the family Gelechiidae. It is found in the Russian Far East, Korea, Japan (Honshu) and Taiwan.

The wingspan is 13-13.5 mm.

The larvae feed on Quercus mongolica.
