= Tridrepana mediata =

Scientific classification
- Domain: Eukaryota
- Kingdom: Animalia
- Phylum: Arthropoda
- Class: Insecta
- Order: Lepidoptera
- Family: Drepanidae
- Genus: Tridrepana
- Species: T. mediata

Binomial name
- Tridrepana mediata (Warren, 1922)

Synonyms
- Iridrepana mediata Warren, 1922

Species of hook-tip moth

Tridrepana mediata is a moth in the family Drepanidae. It was described by William Warren in 1922. It is found in New Guinea, extending to Goodenough Island and Sudest Island in the south-west.

The wingspan is about 29.4–33.4 mm for males and 34.2–42.2 mm for females.
