= Faristenia medimaculata =

Scientific classification
- Kingdom: Animalia
- Phylum: Arthropoda
- Clade: Pancrustacea
- Class: Insecta
- Order: Lepidoptera
- Family: Gelechiidae
- Genus: Faristenia
- Species: F. medimaculata

Binomial name
- Faristenia medimaculata Li & Zheng, 1998

Species of moth

Faristenia medimaculata is a moth in the family Gelechiidae. It is found in China (Jiangxi).
