= Faristenia quercivora =

Scientific classification
- Kingdom: Animalia
- Phylum: Arthropoda
- Class: Insecta
- Order: Lepidoptera
- Family: Gelechiidae
- Genus: Faristenia
- Species: F. quercivora

Binomial name
- Faristenia quercivora Ponomarenko, 1991

Species of moth

Faristenia quercivora is a moth in the family Gelechiidae. It is found in the Russian Far East, Korea and Japan (Honshu).

The wingspan is 13.5–17 mm.

The larvae feed on Quercus mongolica.
