= Faristenia obliqua =

Scientific classification
- Domain: Eukaryota
- Kingdom: Animalia
- Phylum: Arthropoda
- Class: Insecta
- Order: Lepidoptera
- Family: Gelechiidae
- Genus: Faristenia
- Species: F. obliqua

Binomial name
- Faristenia obliqua Park, Lee & Lee, 2000

Species of moth

Faristenia obliqua is a moth in the family Gelechiidae. It is found in Taiwan.

The wingspan is 15–17 mm.
