= Faristenia praemaculata =

Scientific classification
- Kingdom: Animalia
- Phylum: Arthropoda
- Class: Insecta
- Order: Lepidoptera
- Family: Gelechiidae
- Genus: Faristenia
- Species: F. praemaculata

Binomial name
- Faristenia praemaculata (Meyrick, 1931)

Synonyms
- Chelaria praemaculata Meyrick, 1931; Hypatima praemaculata Meyrick, 1931

Species of moth

Faristenia praemaculata is a moth in the family Gelechiidae. It is found in China (Sichuan).
