= Faristenia nemoriella =

Scientific classification
- Kingdom: Animalia
- Phylum: Arthropoda
- Class: Insecta
- Order: Lepidoptera
- Family: Gelechiidae
- Genus: Faristenia
- Species: F. nemoriella

Binomial name
- Faristenia nemoriella Ponomarenko, 1998

Species of moth

Faristenia nemoriella is a moth in the family Gelechiidae. It is found in the Russian Far East.
