= Faristenia mukurossivora =

Scientific classification
- Kingdom: Animalia
- Phylum: Arthropoda
- Clade: Pancrustacea
- Class: Insecta
- Order: Lepidoptera
- Family: Gelechiidae
- Genus: Faristenia
- Species: F. mukurossivora

Binomial name
- Faristenia mukurossivora Ueda & Ponomarenko, 2000

Species of moth

Faristenia mukurossivora is a moth in the family Gelechiidae. It is found in Japan (Honshu).

The length of the forewings is 6.2–6.8 mm (0.24–0.27 in) for males and 6.5–7.4 mm (0.26–0.29 in) for females. The larvae feed on Sapindus mukorossi. (Note: Spelled Sapindus mukurossi by Ueda & Ponomarenko (2000). Hence the specific name, "mukurossi-eater".)
