= Tridrepana lunulata =

Scientific classification
- Domain: Eukaryota
- Kingdom: Animalia
- Phylum: Arthropoda
- Class: Insecta
- Order: Lepidoptera
- Family: Drepanidae
- Genus: Tridrepana
- Species: T. lunulata

Binomial name
- Tridrepana lunulata (Butler, 1887)

Synonyms
- Callidrepana lunulata Butler, 1887; Tridrepana fasciata Warren, 1903; Iridrepana fasciata Warren, 1922; Tridrepana prolata Watson, 1957

Species of hook-tip moth

Tridrepana lunulata is a moth in the family Drepanidae. It was described by Arthur Gardiner Butler in 1887. It is found in Indonesia, Papua New Guinea and Australia, where it has been recorded from northern Queensland.

The wingspan is about 25 mm. The wings are yellow with brown patches on the forewings.
