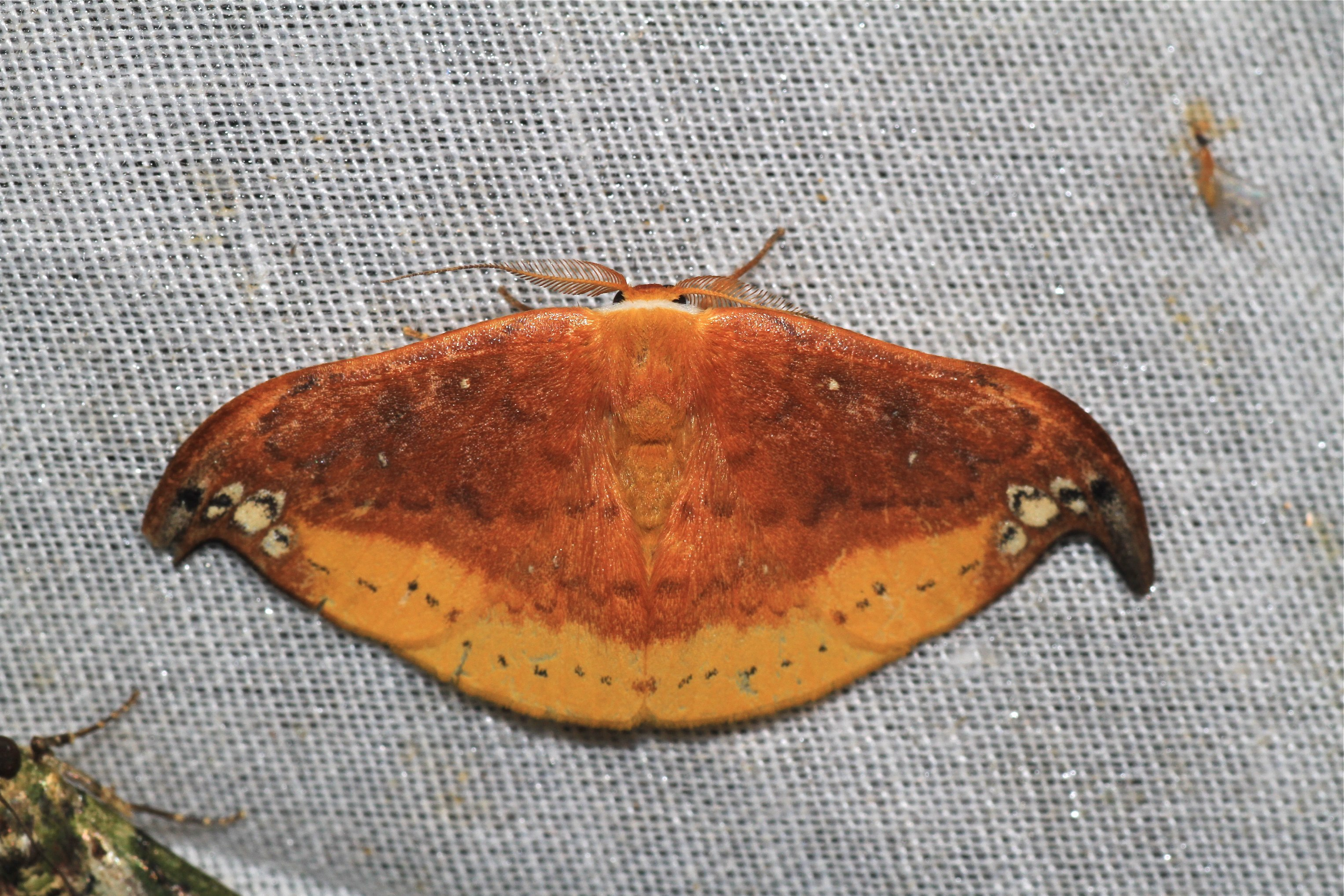

Scientific classification
- Domain: Eukaryota
- Kingdom: Animalia
- Phylum: Arthropoda
- Class: Insecta
- Order: Lepidoptera
- Family: Drepanidae
- Genus: Tridrepana
- Species: T. subtusmaculata

Binomial name
- Tridrepana subtusmaculata Gaede, 1933

Synonyms
- Tridrepana septempunctata f. subtusmaculata Gaede, 1933

= Tridrepana subtusmaculata =

Species of hook-tip moth

Tridrepana subtusmaculata is a moth in the family Drepanidae. It was described by Max Gaede in 1933. It is found on Peninsular Malaysia and Borneo.

The wingspan is about 31.4-36.8 mm.
