= Tridrepana rubromarginata =

Scientific classification
- Kingdom: Animalia
- Phylum: Arthropoda
- Class: Insecta
- Order: Lepidoptera
- Family: Drepanidae
- Genus: Tridrepana
- Species: T. rubromarginata

Binomial name
- Tridrepana rubromarginata (Leech, 1898)

Synonyms
- Drepana rubromarginata Leech, 1898; Iridrepana rubromarginata

Species of hook-tip moth

Tridrepana rubromarginata is a moth in the family Drepanidae. It was described by John Henry Leech in 1898. It is found in China, India, Bhutan and Nepal.

It features a wingspan of approximately 33 mm. The forewings are predominantly yellow, with a reddish-brown border extending from vein 6 to the inner margin. The antemedial line is blackish and undulates, while the postmedial line is blackish, wavy, and intermittently interrupted towards the costa. A submarginal line, which is blackish and wavy, becomes indistinct as it approaches both the costa and the inner margin. Additionally, there is a black spot on the inner margin marking the termination point of these lines. The discal cell contains two blackish spots, an eight-shaped mark at the cell's end, and a more or less round mark below it, with the upper part of the eight-shaped mark centered in whitish color. The reddish marginal border is intersected by a wavy line of the ground color. The hindwings are paler, with faint transverse markings primarily visible in the abdominal area. Notably, there is a blackish spot between veins 2 and 3, and another between veins 3 and 4, with the former centered in white.

== Subspecies ==
- Tridrepana rubromarginata rubromarginata (China: Gansu, Fujian, Sichuan, Yunnan)
- Tridrepana rubromarginata indica Watson, 1957 (India, Bhutan, Nepal, China: Tibet)
