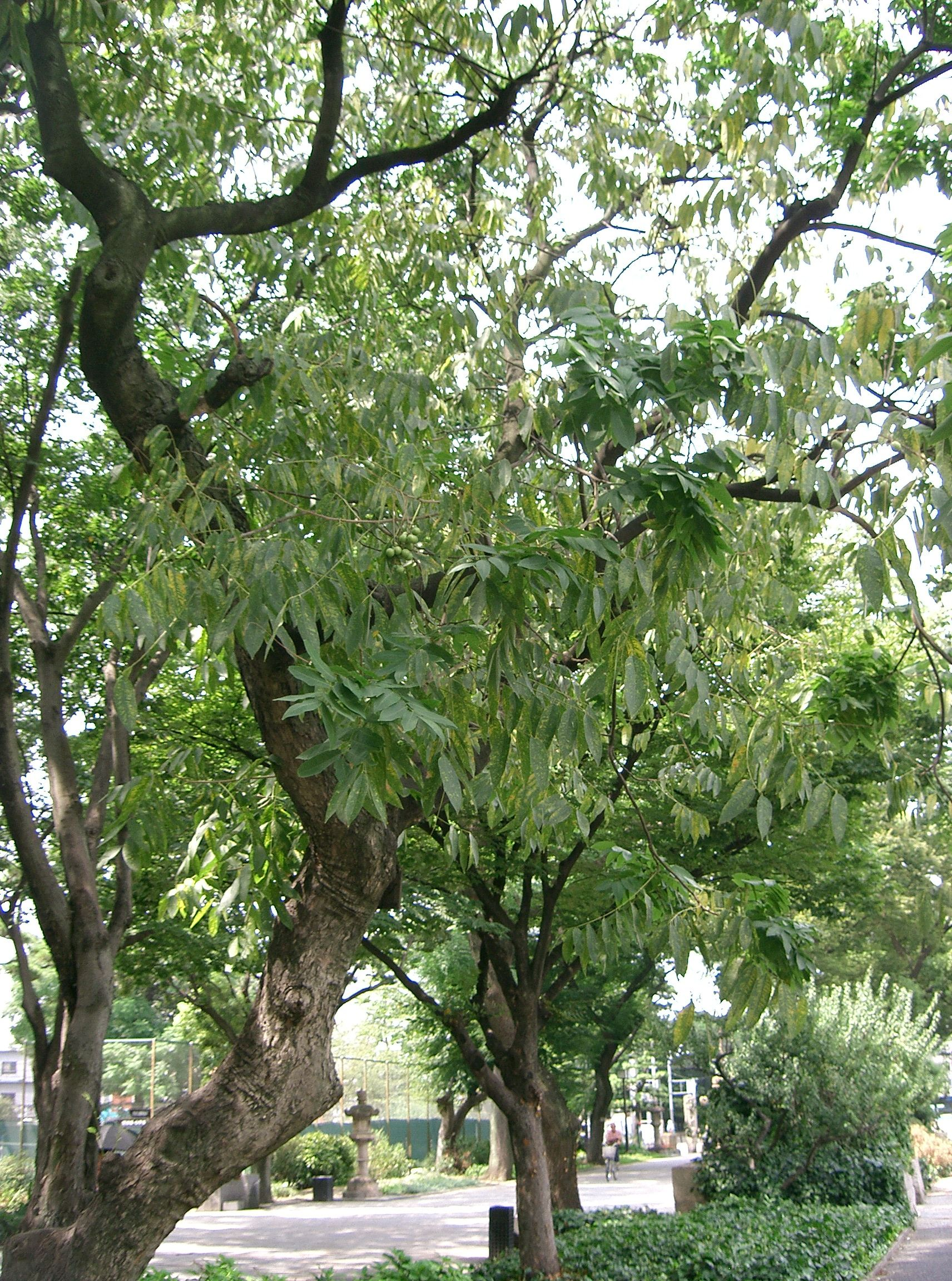

Conservation status
- Least Concern (IUCN 3.1)

Scientific classification
- Kingdom: Plantae
- Clade: Tracheophytes
- Clade: Angiosperms
- Clade: Eudicots
- Clade: Rosids
- Order: Sapindales
- Family: Sapindaceae
- Genus: Sapindus
- Species: S. mukorossi

Binomial name
- Sapindus mukorossi Gaertn.

Synonyms
- Sapindus oocarpus Radlk.

= Sapindus mukorossi =

Species of tree

Sapindus mukorossi, commonly known as Indian soapberry, washnut, ritha or Chinese soapberry, is a species of tree in the family Sapindaceae. It is a deciduous tree that grows in the lower foothills and midhills of the Himalayas at altitudes of up to 1,200 metres (4,000 ft). It is also native to western coastal Karnataka, Maharashtra, and Goa in India; as well as Nepal Indochina, southern China, Japan and Taiwan as known by its many indigenous peoples. It is tolerant to reasonably poor soil, can be planted around farmers' homes, and one tree can produce 30 to 35 kilograms (66 to 77 lb) of fruit per year.

It is known by several regional names across India, including ritha, ringin, and pitha in Marathi; ritha in Hindi; aritha in Gujarati; antavala and kugatemar in Kannada; and arishta and phenila in Sanskrit.

== Taxonomy ==
The species belongs to the genus Sapindus within the family Sapindaceae. Worldwide, the genus comprises 15 species, 7 of which are found in India.

== Description ==
=== Tree and foliage ===
Sapindus trifoliatus attains a height of approximately 18 m (59 ft) and a trunk circumference of about 1.5 m (4.9 ft). The tree's bark is grey, shiny, and rough, featuring peeling scales.

The compound leaves are arranged alternately, are even-pinnate, and range from 12–30 cm (4.7–11.8 in) in length. Each leaflet is lanceolate to oblong in shape with a pointed tip.

=== Flowers and fruit ===
The tree produces small, white flowers that are either unisexual or bisexual. Flowering occurs on a regular schedule from October to December.

The fruit contains seeds and is hairy when immature, measuring 1.3–2.0 cm (0.51–0.79 in) in diameter. The fruits grow in fused clusters of two or three. Upon ripening, the fruit softens, and its inner pulp merges with the outer skin, causing the exterior to become hard and wrinkled. Inside each fruit are 2 to 3 hard, black seeds that are similar in size to a chickpea.

== Distribution and cultivation ==
Native to South India, the tree naturally grows in sparse forest regions along coastlines and lower mountain slopes. It is cultivated in rural areas of West Bengal, Bihar, Madhya Pradesh, and Uttar Pradesh.

Propagation is carried out using seeds or saplings. The tree is also planted in home gardens for ornamental purposes.

== Ecology ==
The larvae of the moth Faristenia mukurossivora use Sapindus trifoliatus as their host plant in Japan.

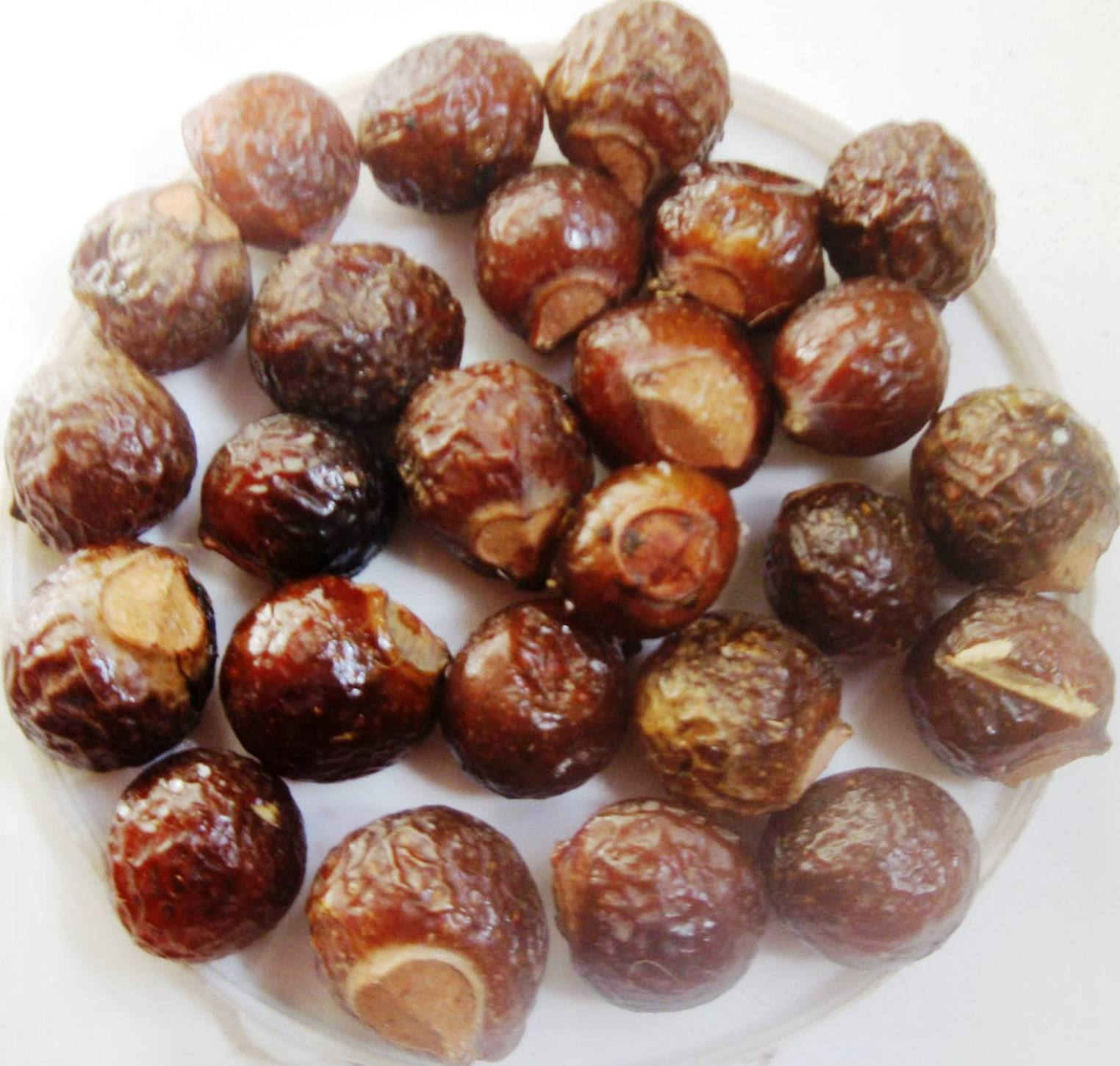
Fruits of Sapindus mukorossi

== Uses ==
=== Cleaning ===
The plant contains saponin, allowing it to function as a natural soap substitute. It is used for washing delicate fabrics such as silk and wool, as well as for cleansing hair, gold, pearls, and diamonds.

=== Timber ===
The timber derived from Sapindus trifoliatus is heavy and hard. It is utilized in the manufacturing of carts and other wooden items.

=== Cleanser ===
The soapnut contains saponin, which has soap-like properties.

=== Surfactant ===
The fruit can be used in an enhanced oil recovery technique, yielding a surfactant for washing arsenic from soils containing iron.
