= Tridrepana adelpha =

Scientific classification
- Domain: Eukaryota
- Kingdom: Animalia
- Phylum: Arthropoda
- Class: Insecta
- Order: Lepidoptera
- Family: Drepanidae
- Genus: Tridrepana
- Species: T. adelpha

Binomial name
- Tridrepana adelpha Swinhoe, 1905

Species of hook-tip moth

Tridrepana adelpha is a moth in the family Drepanidae. It was described by Charles Swinhoe in 1905. It is found in north-eastern India.

The wingspan is about 29.8-25.6 mm.
