= Tridrepana sadana =

Scientific classification
- Domain: Eukaryota
- Kingdom: Animalia
- Phylum: Arthropoda
- Class: Insecta
- Order: Lepidoptera
- Family: Drepanidae
- Genus: Tridrepana
- Species: T. sadana

Binomial name
- Tridrepana sadana (Moore, 1865)

Synonyms
- Drepana sadana Moore, 1865; Platypteryx sadana; Tridrepana adelpha matronalis Bryk, 1943

Species of hook-tip moth

Tridrepana sadana is a moth in the family Drepanidae. It was described by Frederic Moore in 1865. It is found in China (Hubei, Tibet), India, Nepal and Myanmar.

Adults are similar to Tridrepana finita.
