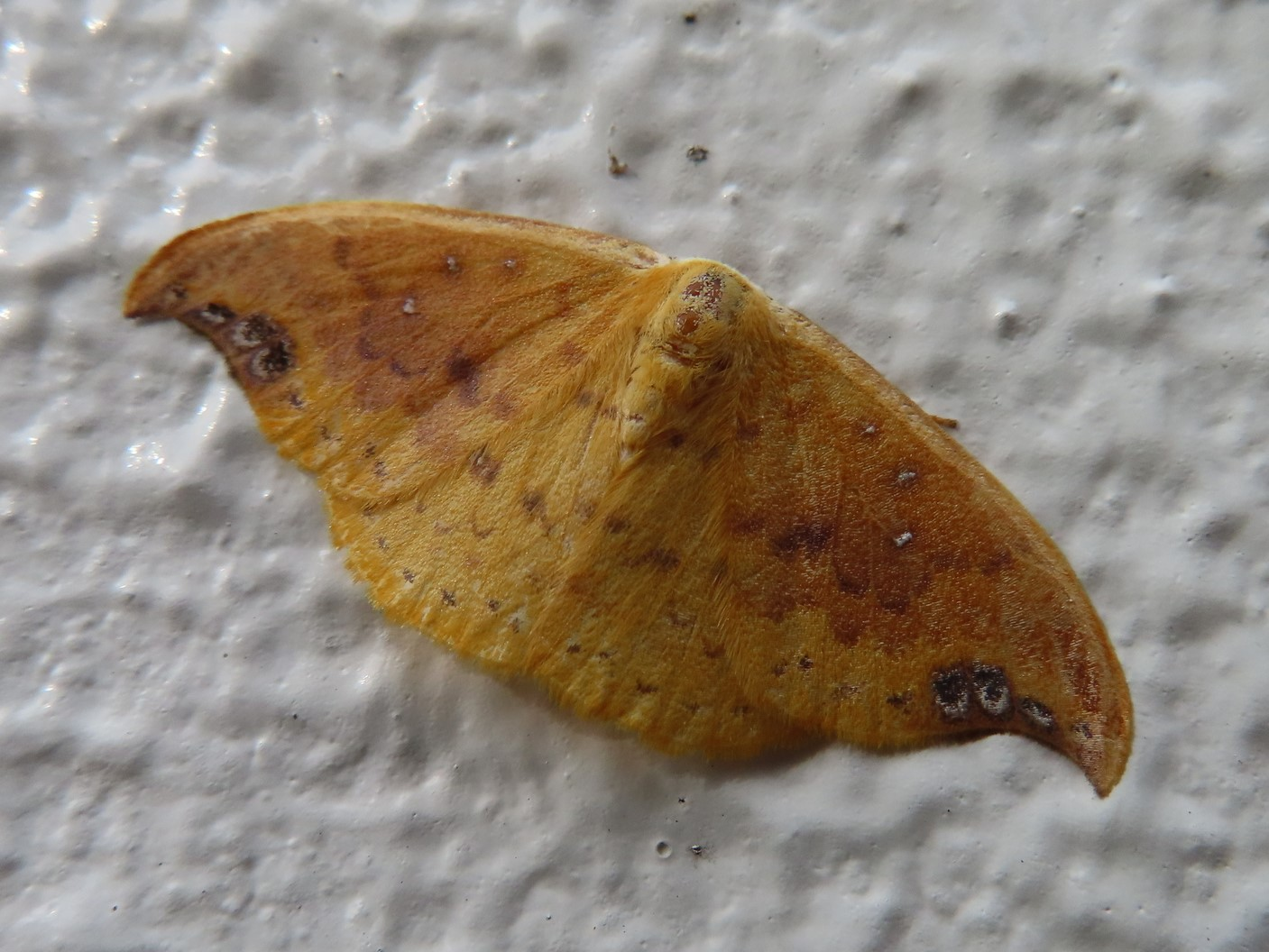

Scientific classification
- Domain: Eukaryota
- Kingdom: Animalia
- Phylum: Arthropoda
- Class: Insecta
- Order: Lepidoptera
- Family: Drepanidae
- Genus: Tridrepana
- Species: T. crocea

Binomial name
- Tridrepana crocea (Leech, 1889)

Synonyms
- Drepana crocea Leech, 1888; Albara crocea; Konjikia crocea; Tridrepana leva Chu & Wang, 1988

= Tridrepana crocea =

Species of hook-tip moth

Tridrepana crocea is a species of moth in the family Drepanidae. It was first described by John Henry Leech in 1889. It is found in China (Zhejiang, Hubei, Jiangxi, Hunan, Fujian, Guangxi, Sichuan, Yunnan), Japan and Korea.
