= Stenolechia bathrodyas =

Scientific classification
- Kingdom: Animalia
- Phylum: Arthropoda
- Clade: Pancrustacea
- Class: Insecta
- Order: Lepidoptera
- Family: Gelechiidae
- Genus: Stenolechia
- Species: S. bathrodyas

Binomial name
- Stenolechia bathrodyas Meyrick, 1935

Synonyms
- Stenolechia batrodryas – Clarke, 1969; Stenolechia bathodyas – Okada, 1962

Species of moth

Stenolechia bathrodyas is a moth of the family Gelechiidae. It was first described by Edward Meyrick in 1935. It is found on the Japanese islands of Honshu and Kyushu and in Korea.

The wingspan is about 7 mm (0.28 in). The larvae feed on Juniperus species, mining the leaves of their host plant. They are considered serious pests.
