= Stenolechia notomochla =

Scientific classification
- Kingdom: Animalia
- Phylum: Arthropoda
- Clade: Pancrustacea
- Class: Insecta
- Order: Lepidoptera
- Family: Gelechiidae
- Genus: Stenolechia
- Species: S. notomochla

Binomial name
- Stenolechia notomochla Meyrick, 1935

Synonyms
- Gibbosa celeris M.M. Omelko, 1988

Species of moth

Stenolechia notomochla is a moth of the family Gelechiidae. It is found in Japan (Kyushu, Honshu, Tsushima Island), Korea, and the Russian Far East.

The forewing length is 4.2–5 mm (0.17–0.20 in). The wingspan is 9 mm (0.35 in) for males. The larvae feed on the shoots of Quercus dentata.
