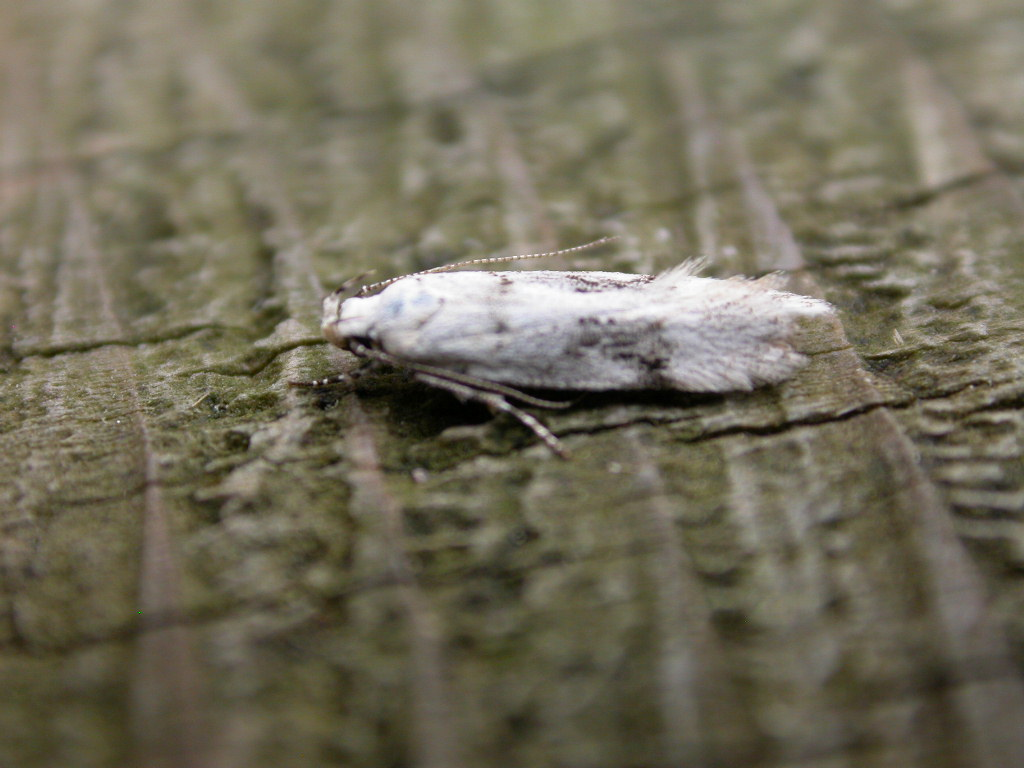

Scientific classification
- Kingdom: Animalia
- Phylum: Arthropoda
- Class: Insecta
- Order: Lepidoptera
- Family: Gelechiidae
- Genus: Stenolechia
- Species: S. gemmella

Binomial name
- Stenolechia gemmella (Linnaeus, 1758)

Synonyms
- Phalaena (Tinea) gemmella Linnaeus, 1758; Alucita nivella Fabricius, 1794; Recurvaria nivea Haworth, 1828; Lita nigrovittella Duponchel, [1839]; Gelechia (Brachmia) lepidella Zeller, 1839

= Stenolechia gemmella =

Species of moth

Stenolechia gemmella (black-dotted groundling) is a moth of the family Gelechiidae. It is known from most of Europe

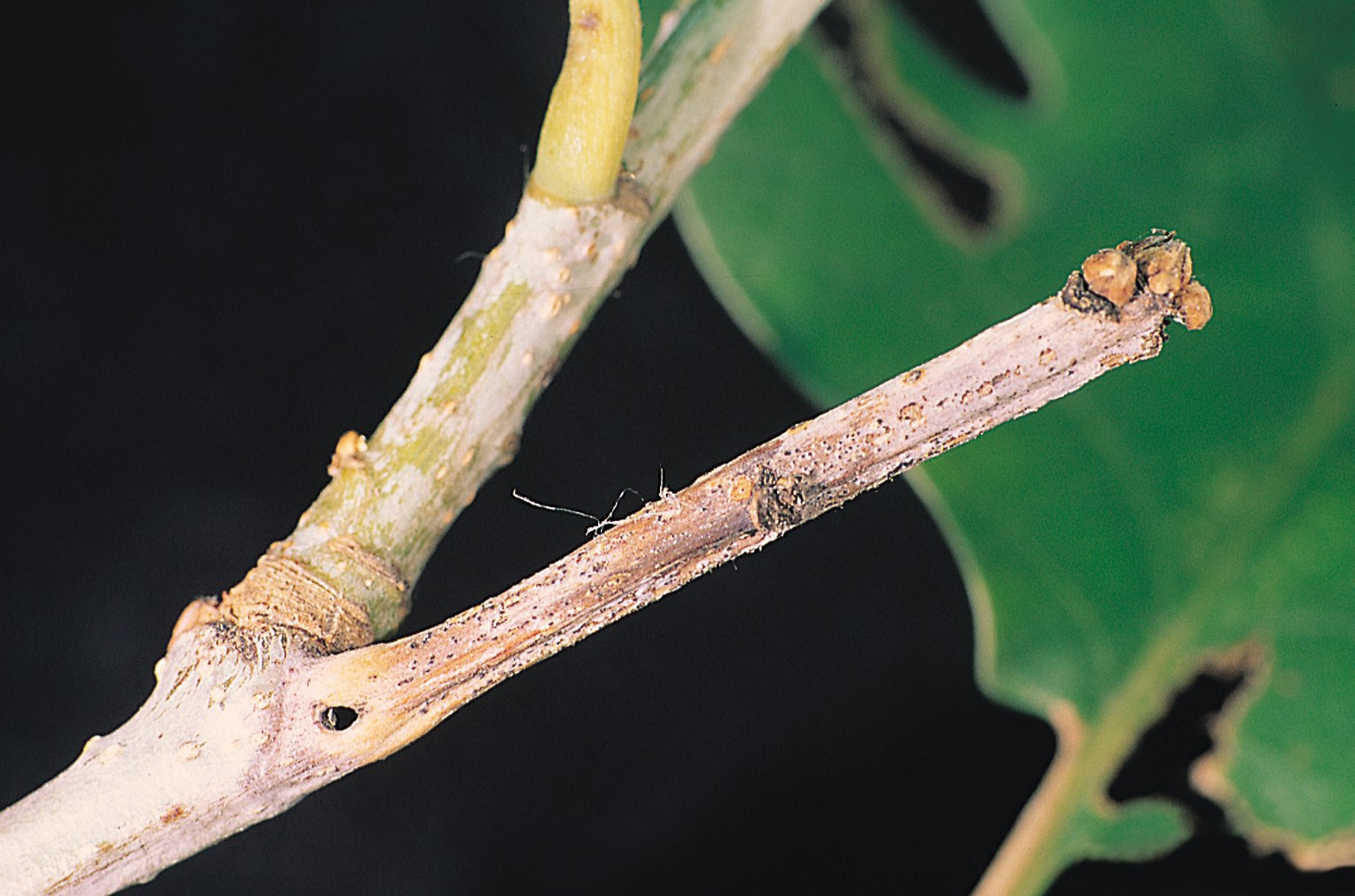
Damage

The wingspan is 10–11 mm. The head is white. Forewings are whitish, somewhat sprinkled with brownish; a spot on costa near base and another at 1/3, an inwardly oblique fascia beyond middle, somewhat interrupted near costa, a spot on base of dorsum, and another at tornus black; some black scales towards apex; vein 4 absent. Hindwings are light grey. The larva is whitish; spots pale grey; head and plate of 2 yellow-brown, latter grey-speckled.

Adults are on wing from July to September, and is known for its habit of resting in crevices in bark.

The larvae feed on Quercus species. They feed in the young shoots.
