= Stenolechia frustulenta =

Scientific classification
- Kingdom: Animalia
- Phylum: Arthropoda
- Class: Insecta
- Order: Lepidoptera
- Family: Gelechiidae
- Genus: Stenolechia
- Species: S. frustulenta

Binomial name
- Stenolechia frustulenta Meyrick, 1923

Species of moth

Stenolechia frustulenta is a moth of the family Gelechiidae first described by Edward Meyrick in 1923. It is found in Assam, India.

The wingspan is 8–9 mm. The forewings are white, irregularly and suffusedly sprinkled with dark brownish, sometimes forming cloudy spots or blotches attached to black markings. There is a black elongate mark on the costa towards the base, a spot at one-third and a larger one beyond the middle, as well as a black dot in the disc at one-fifth, and one towards the dorsum rather beyond it. There is a very oblique black dash in the disc before the middle and the second discal stigma is small, black, with a black dot towards the dorsum somewhat before this. There is also a short black linear mark in the disc at four-fifths and a slight black mark near the costa before the apex. The hindwings are whitish grey.
