= Stenolechia celeris =

Scientific classification
- Domain: Eukaryota
- Kingdom: Animalia
- Phylum: Arthropoda
- Class: Insecta
- Order: Lepidoptera
- Family: Gelechiidae
- Genus: Stenolechia
- Species: S. celeris

Binomial name
- Stenolechia celeris (Omelko, 1988)

Synonyms
- Gibbosa celeris Omelko, 1988

Species of moth

Stenolechia celeris is a moth of the family Gelechiidae. It is found in the Russian Far East.
