= Stenolechia squamifera =

Scientific classification
- Kingdom: Animalia
- Phylum: Arthropoda
- Clade: Pancrustacea
- Class: Insecta
- Order: Lepidoptera
- Family: Gelechiidae
- Genus: Stenolechia
- Species: S. squamifera

Binomial name
- Stenolechia squamifera Kanazawa, 1984

Species of moth

Stenolechia squamifera is a moth of the family Gelechiidae. It is found in Japan (Kyushu, Tsushima Island).

The length of the forewings is 3.5–4.2 mm.
