= Stenolechia rectivalva =

Scientific classification
- Kingdom: Animalia
- Phylum: Arthropoda
- Clade: Pancrustacea
- Class: Insecta
- Order: Lepidoptera
- Family: Gelechiidae
- Genus: Stenolechia
- Species: S. rectivalva

Binomial name
- Stenolechia rectivalva Kanazawa, 1984

Species of moth

Stenolechia rectivalva is a moth of the family Gelechiidae. It is found in Japan (Honshu).

The length of the forewings is 3.5–4.2 mm.
