= Stenolechia deltocausta =

Scientific classification
- Kingdom: Animalia
- Phylum: Arthropoda
- Class: Insecta
- Order: Lepidoptera
- Family: Gelechiidae
- Genus: Stenolechia
- Species: S. deltocausta

Binomial name
- Stenolechia deltocausta Meyrick, 1929

Species of moth

Stenolechia deltocausta is a moth of the family Gelechiidae. It is found in Assam, India.

The wingspan is about 10 mm.
