= Stenolechia kodamai =

Scientific classification
- Kingdom: Animalia
- Phylum: Arthropoda
- Clade: Pancrustacea
- Class: Insecta
- Order: Lepidoptera
- Family: Gelechiidae
- Genus: Stenolechia
- Species: S. kodamai

Binomial name
- Stenolechia kodamai Okada, 1962

Species of moth

Stenolechia kodamai is a moth of the family Gelechiidae. It is found in Japan (Honshu) and Korea (Yeonpyeongdo and Daecheongdo).

== Description ==
The wingspan is 6–7 mm. The larvae feed on Pinus densiflora. They mine the leaves of their host plant.
