= Stenolechia marginipunctella =

Scientific classification
- Kingdom: Animalia
- Phylum: Arthropoda
- Clade: Pancrustacea
- Class: Insecta
- Order: Lepidoptera
- Family: Gelechiidae
- Genus: Stenolechia
- Species: S. marginipunctella

Binomial name
- Stenolechia marginipunctella (Stainton, 1859)

Synonyms
- Gelechia marginipunctella Stainton, 1859

Species of moth

Stenolechia marginipunctella is a moth of the family Gelechiidae. It is found in India (Bengal).

The forewings are white, sparingly dusted with brownish scales, and with some small brownish spots along the costa and inner margin, and a few along the disc. The hindwings are pale grey.
