= Stenolechia zelosaris =

Scientific classification
- Kingdom: Animalia
- Phylum: Arthropoda
- Class: Insecta
- Order: Lepidoptera
- Family: Gelechiidae
- Genus: Stenolechia
- Species: S. zelosaris

Binomial name
- Stenolechia zelosaris Meyrick, 1923

Species of moth

Stenolechia zelosaris is a moth of the family Gelechiidae. It is found in India (Assam).

The wingspan is about 10 mm. The forewings are grey speckled darker and with an oblique wedge-shaped spot of darker suffusion on the costa beyond the middle. The plical stigma is distinct, black and terminated by a small whitish dot. The hindwings are grey.
