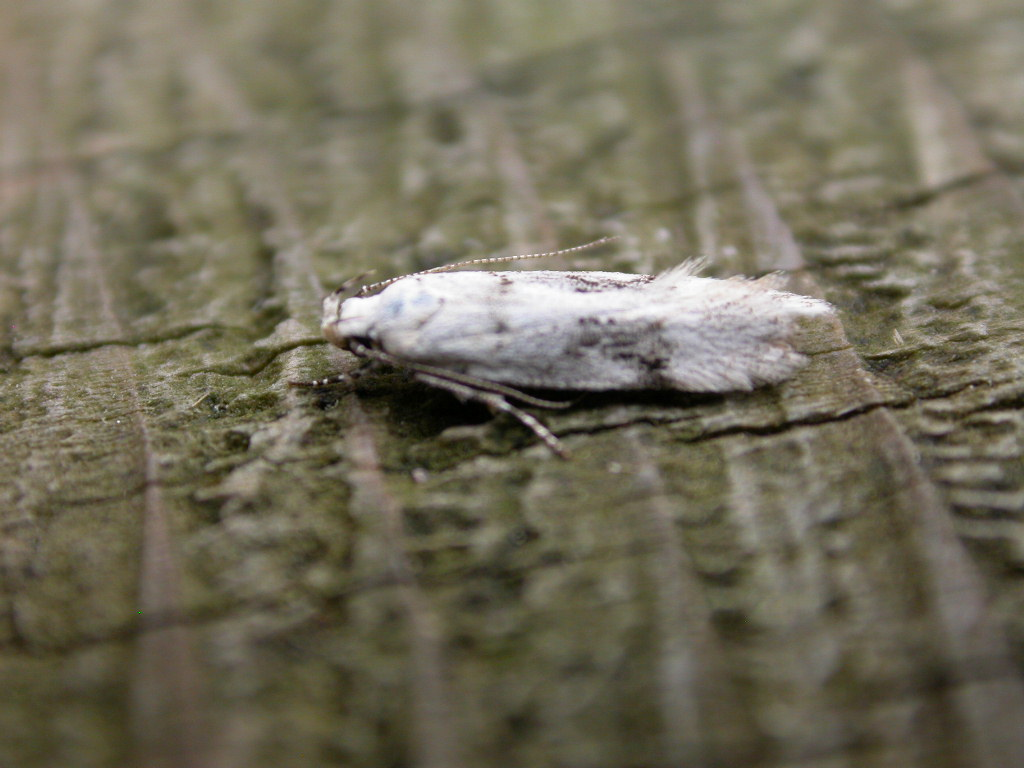
- Stenolechia gemmella

Scientific classification
- Domain: Eukaryota
- Kingdom: Animalia
- Phylum: Arthropoda
- Class: Insecta
- Order: Lepidoptera
- Family: Gelechiidae
- Tribe: Litini
- Genus: Stenolechia; Meyrick, 1894

Synonyms
- Poecilia Heinemann, 1870 (preocc. Schneider, 1801); Gibbosa Omelko, 1988

= Stenolechia =

Genus of moths

Stenolechia is a genus of moths in the family Gelechiidae.

== Species ==
- Stenolechia celeris (Omelko, 1988)
- Stenolechia deltocausta Meyrick, 1929
- Stenolechia frustulenta Meyrick, 1923
- Stenolechia gemmella (Linnaeus, 1758)
- Stenolechia marginipunctella (Stainton, 1859)
- Stenolechia orsicoma (Meyrick, 1918)
- Stenolechia trichaspis (Meyrick, 1918)
- Stenolechia zelosaris Meyrick, 1923
- notomochla species-group
  - Stenolechia notomochla Meyrick, 1935
  - Stenolechia robusta Kanazawa, 1984
- bathrodyas species-group
  - Stenolechia bathrodyas Meyrick, 1935
  - Stenolechia kodamai Okada, 1962
- rectivalva species-group
  - Stenolechia squamifera Kanazawa, 1984
  - Stenolechia rectivalva Kanazawa, 1984
