= Stenolechia robusta =

Scientific classification
- Kingdom: Animalia
- Phylum: Arthropoda
- Clade: Pancrustacea
- Class: Insecta
- Order: Lepidoptera
- Family: Gelechiidae
- Genus: Stenolechia
- Species: S. robusta

Binomial name
- Stenolechia robusta Kanazawa, 1984

Species of moth

Stenolechia robusta is a moth of the family Gelechiidae. It is found in Japan (Tsushima Island).

The length of the forewings is 4.5–5.9 mm.
