= Stenolechia trichaspis =

Scientific classification
- Kingdom: Animalia
- Phylum: Arthropoda
- Class: Insecta
- Order: Lepidoptera
- Family: Gelechiidae
- Genus: Stenolechia
- Species: S. trichaspis

Binomial name
- Stenolechia trichaspis (Meyrick, 1918)

Synonyms
- Recurvaria trichaspis Meyrick, 1918

Species of moth

Stenolechia trichaspis is a moth of the family Gelechiidae. It is found in Kashmir and Sri Lanka.

The wingspan is 9–11 mm. The forewings are white irregularly irrorated fuscous and with the markings blackish-fuscous. There are elongate spots on the costa towards the base, before the middle, and at two-thirds, as well as a small spot beneath the fold near the base. There are suffused spots representing the stigmata, the plical beneath the first discal. There is also a suffused spot on the tornus and one at the apex, as well as a cloudy blackish dot in the disc towards the apex. The hindwings are pale bluish-grey.
