= Stenolechia orsicoma =

Scientific classification
- Kingdom: Animalia
- Phylum: Arthropoda
- Class: Insecta
- Order: Lepidoptera
- Family: Gelechiidae
- Genus: Stenolechia
- Species: S. orsicoma

Binomial name
- Stenolechia orsicoma (Meyrick, 1918)

Synonyms
- Recurvaria orsicoma Meyrick, 1918

Species of moth

Stenolechia orsicoma is a moth of the family Gelechiidae. It is found in southern India and Sri Lanka.

The wingspan is 11–12 mm. The forewings are white, irregularly irrorated ochreous or ochreous-fuscous, tending to form suffused spots beneath dark markings. The markings are blackish, with elongate spots on the costa towards the base, before the middle, and at two-thirds, as well as a dot above the dorsum near the base and small dots above and below the fold at one-fourth. There is an elongate mark in the middle of the disc, and a linear dot on the fold somewhat before it. There is also a suffused spot on the tornus, a narrow elongate spot or short streak in the disc at five-sixths and two dots on the costa posteriorly and one at the apex, sometimes little marked. The hindwings are pale grey, paler and bluish-tinged in the disc.
