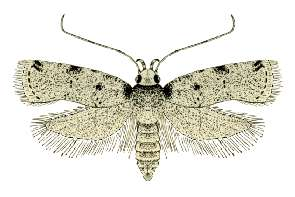
- Adult Psorosticha zizyphi

Scientific classification
- Kingdom: Animalia
- Phylum: Arthropoda
- Clade: Pancrustacea
- Class: Insecta
- Order: Lepidoptera
- Family: Depressariidae
- Subfamily: Depressariinae; Meyrick, 1883

Genera
- Numerous, see text

Synonyms
- Cryptolechiinae; Cryptolechiini; Depressariini; Depressiinae (lapsus); Epigraphiini; (but see text)

= Depressariinae =

Subfamily of moths

The Depressariinae – sometimes spelled "Depressiinae" in error – are a subfamily of moths in the superfamily Gelechioidea. Like their relatives therein, their exact relationships are not yet very well resolved. It has been considered part of family Elachistidae sensu lato or included in an expanded Oecophoridae. In modern classifications they are treated as the distinct gelechioid family Depressariidae.

As regards subdivisions, the Amphisbatinae are often held to be as close to the Depressariinae as to be included there, in particular if the latter are raised to full family rank, but also otherwise (as a tribe Amphisbatini in the Depressariinae). If Depressariinae are treated as oecophorid subfamily, it is more common to include the group around Cryptolechia, which is sometimes (especially in older arrangements) separated as tribe Cryptolechiini in subfamily Cryptolechiinae. The lineage of Cacochroa and its closest relatives – typically included in the "Cryptolechiinae" if these are treated as independent oecophorid subfamily – actually seems to be closer to Orophia, and would be part of tribe Orophiini if these are placed in the Oecophorinae. But they have also been included in the present group (as tribe(s) Orophiini and sometimes also Cacochroini), particularly if this is considered a full-fledged family. The same holds true for the Xyloryctidae, a group treated here as family but previously thought to be a subfamily of the Oecophoridae. Finally, the Semioscopis lineage is occasionally separated from the rest of the Depressariinae as tribe Epigraphiini (after its junior synonym Epigraphia). In all such treatments, the core group of Depressariinae becomes a tribe Depressariini.

== Distribution and ecology ==
Some 600 species were placed here as of 1999 (but see the caveats about the group's circumscription above). New taxa of Depressariinae are still being discovered and described on a regular basis. The group is found worldwide except on some oceanic islands and frozen wasteland, but the diversity is highest in temperate regions and the group is presumably Holarctic in origin – possibly Palaearctic, as gelechioid diversity in the Neotropics is poor but e.g. in Australia almost 20 species are found. From Europe alone, more than 160 species and subspecies (mostly of genus Agonopterix) were known in 2009, with over 80 recorded from Central Europe.

The caterpillars usually develop in leaves spun together with silk, as stem borers or as seed or flower feeders of dicotyledons. Recorded Depressariinae host plants are mainly eurosids I (e.g. Betulaceae, Fabaceae, Fagaceae, Rosaceae, Salicaceae, Urticaceae) but also from some other families (e.g. Malvaceae and Rutaceae – eurosids II –, or euasterids II like Apiaceae and Asteraceae).

== Genera ==
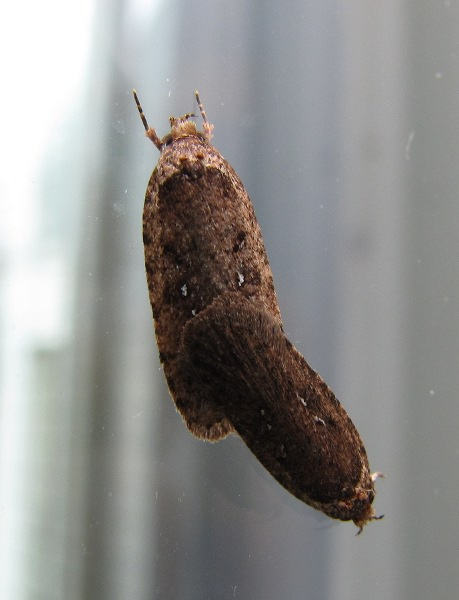
Mating Agonopterix heracliana

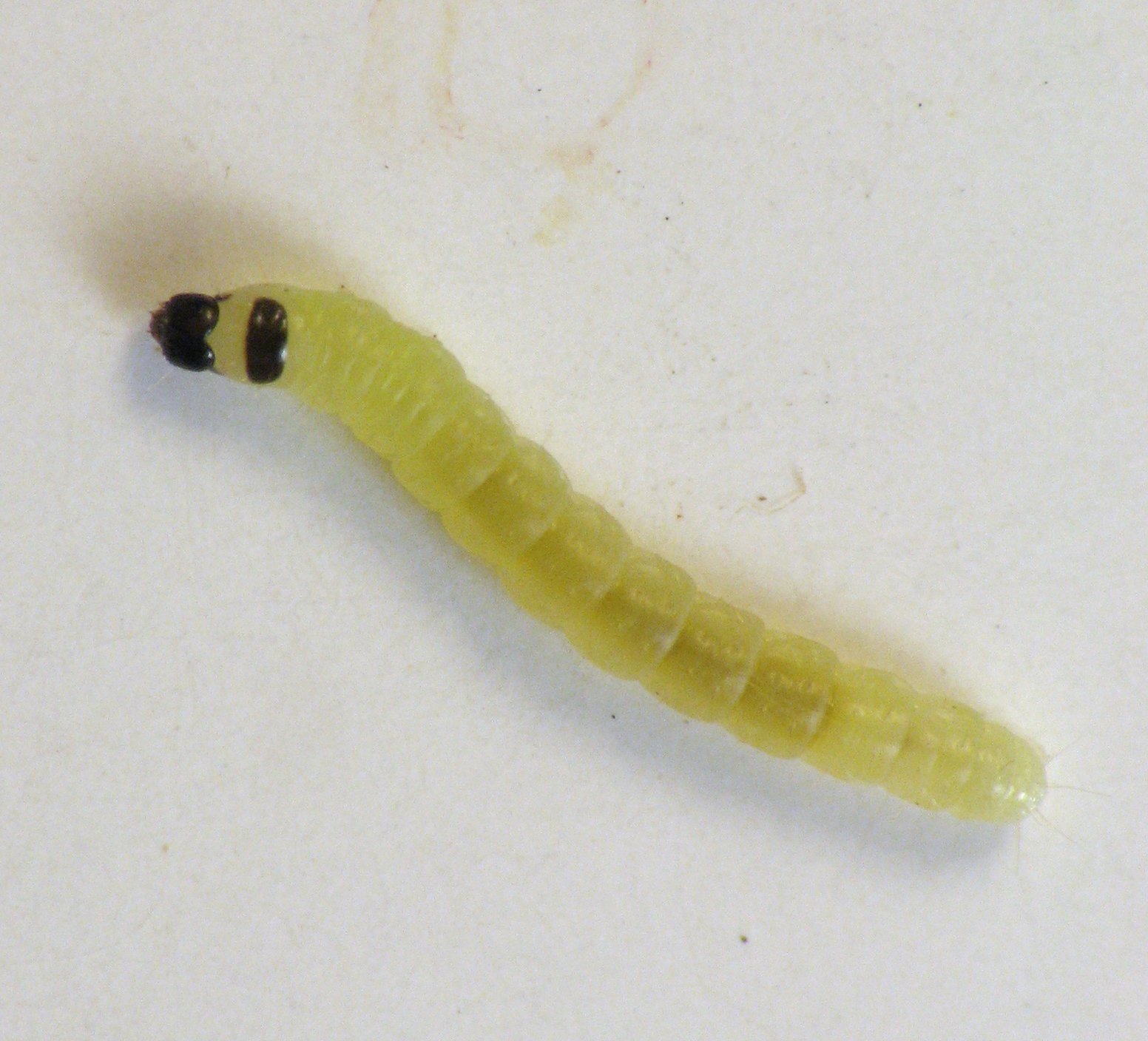
Agonopterix senicionella caterpillar

Genera of Depressariinae – with some notable species also listed – include:

- Tribe Fuchsiini
  - Fuchsia Spuler, 1910
- Tribe Telechrysidini
  - Telechrysis Toll, 1956
- Tribe Depressariini
  - Agonopterix Hübner, 1825
  - Apachea Clarke, 1941
  - Bibarrambla Clarke, 1941
  - Depressaria
  - Exaeretia Stainton, 1849
  - Himmacia Clarke, 1941
  - Levipalpus Hannemann, 1953
  - Luquetia Leraut, 1991
  - Nites Hodges, 1974
  - Semioscopis Hübner, 1825
- Tribe Amphisbatini
  - Eupragia Walsingham, 1911
  - Machimia (Amphisbatinae?)
  - Psilocorsis Clemens, 1860 (Amphisbatinae?)
- Unplaced to tribe
  - Acria Stephens, 1834
  - Afdera Clarke, 1978
  - Ancipita Busck, 1914
  - Athrinacia Walsingham, 1911
  - Barantola Walker, 1864
  - Bleptochiton Turner, 1947
  - Chariphylla Meyrick, 1921
  - Comotechna Meyrick, 1920
  - Costoma Busck, 1914
  - Deloryctis Meyrick, 1934
  - Doina Clarke, 1978
  - Doleromima Meyrick, 1902
  - Doshia Clarke, 1978
  - Eclecta Meyrick, 1883
  - Ectaga Walsingham, 1912
  - Enchocrates Meyrick, 1883
  - Enteremna Meyrick, 1917
  - Erithyma Meyrick, 1914
  - Euprionocera Turner, 1896
  - Eutorna Meyrick, 1889
  - Filinota Busck, 1911
  - Gnathotona Meyrick, 1931
  - Gonada Busck, 1911
  - Gymnoceros Turner, 1946
  - Habrophylax Meyrick, 1931
  - Haereta Turner, 1947
  - Hamadera Busck, 1914
  - Hastamea Busck, 1940
  - Heterobathra Lower, 1901
  - Himotica Meyrick, 1912
  - Hozbeka Özdikmen, 2009 (formerly Talitha Clarke, 1978 (non Faure, 1958: preoccupied))
  - Idiocrates Meyrick, 1909
  - Iphimachaera Meyrick, 1931
  - Lepidozancla Turner, 1916
  - Loboptila Turner, 1919
  - Lucyna Clarke, 1978
  - Maesara Clarke, 1968
  - Magniophaga Beéche, 2018
  - Mimozela Meyrick, 1914
  - Muna Clarke, 1978
  - Nedenia Clarke, 1978
  - Nematochares Meyrick, 1931
  - Notosara Meyrick, 1890
  - Octasphales Meyrick, 1886
  - Osmarina Clarke, 1978
  - Palinorsa Meyrick, 1924
  - Pedois Lower, 1894
  - Peritornenta Turner, 1900
  - Perzelia Clarke, 1978
  - Philtronoma Meyrick, 1914
  - Pholcobates Meyrick, 1931
  - Phytomimia Walsingham, 1912
  - Pisinidea Butler, 1883
  - Profilinota Clarke, 1973
  - Pseudocentris Meyrick, 1921
  - Psittacastis Meyrick, 1909
  - Psorosticha Lower, 1901
  - Ptilobola Meyrick, 1933
  - Rhindoma Busck, 1914
  - Scoliographa Meyrick, 1916
  - Scorpiopsis Turner, 1894
  - Thalamarchella T. B. Fletcher, 1940 (formerly Thalamarchis Meyrick, 1904 (non Meyrick, 1897: preoccupied))
  - Thyromorpha Turner, 1917
  - Tonica Walker, 1864
  - Trycherodes Meyrick, 1914
