= Talitha =

Talitha (טליתא ṭlīthā) is an Aramaic phrase attributed to Jesus in the New Testament, relating to bringing a girl back to life.

Talitha may also refer to:

== Insects ==
- Talitha (thrips), a thrips genus in subfamily Phlaeothripinae, named by Faure in 1958
- Talitha, a gelechoid moth genus in subfamily Depressariinae, invalidly named by Clarke in 1978 and later renamed Hozbeka

== Stars ==
- Talitha, the proper name of Iota Ursae Majoris (rarely Talitha Borealis)
- Talitha Australis, a rarely-used name for Kappa Ursae Majoris (Alkaphrah)

== Other uses ==
- Talitha (given name), a given name (includes list of people with the given name)
- Talitha (yacht), formerly Talitha G, a yacht owned by the Getty family

== See also ==
- Talitha kum (disambiguation)
