= Scoliographa acanthis =

Scientific classification
- Kingdom: Animalia
- Phylum: Arthropoda
- Class: Insecta
- Order: Lepidoptera
- Family: Depressariidae
- Genus: Scoliographa
- Species: S. acanthis

Binomial name
- Scoliographa acanthis (Meyrick, 1920)

Synonyms
- Polychrosis acanthis Meyrick, 1920; Lobesia acanthis Clarke, 1958; Matsumuraeses acanthis Diakonoff, 1973

Species of moth

Scoliographa acanthis is a moth of the family Tortricidae first described by Edward Meyrick in 1920. It is found in India and Sri Lanka.

Its larval food plant is Justicia gendarussa, where the caterpillar feeds on the stem and leaves.
