= Doina paralagneia =

Scientific classification
- Kingdom: Animalia
- Phylum: Arthropoda
- Class: Insecta
- Order: Lepidoptera
- Family: Depressariidae
- Genus: Doina
- Species: D. paralagneia

Binomial name
- Doina paralagneia J. F. G. Clarke, 1978

Species of moth

Doina paralagneia is a moth in the family Depressariidae. It was described by John Frederick Gates Clarke in 1978. It is found in Chile.

The wingspan is 18–20 mm. Adults are similar to Doina lagneia, except for a spot at the middle of the costa of the forewings, which is more conspicuous than in D. lagneia and the forewings have more of an orange tinge.
