= Afdera =

Afdera may refer to:

- Afdera (moth), a genus of insects in the family Depressariidae
- Afdera (volcano), a mountain in Ethiopia
- Afdera (woreda), a district in Ethiopia
