= Lucyna trifida =

Scientific classification
- Kingdom: Animalia
- Phylum: Arthropoda
- Class: Insecta
- Order: Lepidoptera
- Family: Depressariidae
- Genus: Lucyna
- Species: L. trifida

Binomial name
- Lucyna trifida Beéche, 2012

Species of moth

Lucyna trifida is a moth in the family Depressariidae. It was described by Beéche in 2012. It is found in Chile.
