= Filinota lamprocosma =

Scientific classification
- Domain: Eukaryota
- Kingdom: Animalia
- Phylum: Arthropoda
- Class: Insecta
- Order: Lepidoptera
- Family: Depressariidae
- Genus: Filinota
- Species: F. lamprocosma

Binomial name
- Filinota lamprocosma Meyrick, 1916

Species of moth

Filinota lamprocosma is a moth in the family Depressariidae. It was described by Edward Meyrick in 1916. It is found in French Guiana.

The wingspan is 19–20 mm. The forewings are crimson, partially marked with dark grey suffusion between some of the veins, or (in some specimens) almost wholly suffused with dark ashy grey, the veins towards the costa marked with fine pale yellowish lines, the lower margin of the cell marked with an interrupted pale yellowish line. There is a yellow spot on the dorsum at one-fourth, and three others above it, all obsolete in the grey specimens. There are also narrow semioval yellow blotches on the costa before and beyond the middle, and an irregular yellow streak running around the apex and upper part of the termen. Violet-leaden-metallic subcostal streaks are found in the intervals between these and on the basal fourth and there is a violet-leaden-metallic streak above the middle from the base to the apex, interrupted at one-fourth and in the middle. Three violet-leaden-metallic raised tufts are found in a curved transverse series before the middle of the disc, and one in the disc beyond the middle. The hindwings are whitish, in the grey specimens suffused with pale grey on the apical half.
