= Athrinacia leucographa =

Scientific classification
- Domain: Eukaryota
- Kingdom: Animalia
- Phylum: Arthropoda
- Class: Insecta
- Order: Lepidoptera
- Family: Depressariidae
- Genus: Athrinacia
- Species: A. leucographa

Binomial name
- Athrinacia leucographa Walsingham, 1911

Species of moth

Athrinacia leucographa is a moth in the family Depressariidae. It was described by Lord Walsingham in 1911. It is found in Mexico, where it has been recorded from Guerrero.

The wingspan is about 11 millimetres (3/7 in). The forewings are whitish cinereous, thickly shaded and dusted with fawn brown, of which there is also a small patch at the base of the costa reaching to the fold, a larger patch at one-third, from the upper edge of the cell, reaching to the dorsum and somewhat dilated on the fold, and a narrow transverse patch at the end of the cell, with a series of small marginal blotches commencing beyond the middle of the costa and continued around the apex and termen to the middle of the dorsum. These are all narrowly margined or separated from each other by the pale ground colour, as distinguished from the more sprinkled and shaded portions of the wing. The hindwings are pale brownish grey.
