= Doina subicula =

Scientific classification
- Kingdom: Animalia
- Phylum: Arthropoda
- Class: Insecta
- Order: Lepidoptera
- Family: Depressariidae
- Genus: Doina
- Species: D. subicula

Binomial name
- Doina subicula J. F. G. Clarke, 1978

Species of moth

Doina subicula is a moth in the family Depressariidae. It was described by John Frederick Gates Clarke in 1978. It is found in Chile.

The wingspan is 24–25 mm. The forewings are fuscous with the basal angle light ochraceous buff. On the costa, to the apex, is a series of ill-defined light ochraceous-buff dots and in the cell is a blackish dash joined at the end of the cell by a transverse bar of the same colour. Between the cell and the termen is an ill-defined, outwardly curved series of light ochraceous-buff spots and the termen is narrowly edged blackish fuscous. The hindwings are light greyish olive with a darker line around the outer edge.
