= Gnathotona =

Scientific classification
- Kingdom: Animalia
- Phylum: Arthropoda
- Class: Insecta
- Order: Lepidoptera
- Family: Depressariidae
- Subfamily: Depressariinae
- Genus: Gnathotona; Meyrick, 1931
- Species: G. thermopsamma

Binomial name
- Gnathotona thermopsamma Meyrick, 1931

Genus of moths

Gnathotona is a monotypic moth genus in the family Depressariidae. Its only species, Gnathotona thermopsamma, is found in Paraguay. Both the genus and species were first described by Edward Meyrick in 1931.
