= Palinorsa =

Scientific classification
- Kingdom: Animalia
- Phylum: Arthropoda
- Class: Insecta
- Order: Lepidoptera
- Family: Depressariidae
- Subfamily: Depressariinae
- Genus: Palinorsa; Meyrick, 1924

Genus of moths

Palinorsa is a moth genus of the family Depressariidae.

== Species ==
- Palinorsa acritomorpha Clarke, 1964
- Palinorsa literatella (Busck, 1911)
- Palinorsa raptans (Meyrick, 1920)
- Palinorsa zonaria Clarke, 1964
