= Doina clarkei =

Scientific classification
- Kingdom: Animalia
- Phylum: Arthropoda
- Class: Insecta
- Order: Lepidoptera
- Family: Depressariidae
- Genus: Doina
- Species: D. clarkei

Binomial name
- Doina clarkei Parra & Ibarra-Vidal, 1991

Species of moth

Doina clarkei is a moth in the family Depressariidae. It was described by Luis E. Parra and Héctor Ibarra-Vidal in 1991. It is found in Chile.

Adults are on wing from November to January.

The larvae feed on Nothofagus obliqua.
