= Costoma cirrophaea =

Scientific classification
- Domain: Eukaryota
- Kingdom: Animalia
- Phylum: Arthropoda
- Class: Insecta
- Order: Lepidoptera
- Family: Depressariidae
- Genus: Costoma
- Species: C. cirrophaea

Binomial name
- Costoma cirrophaea (Meyrick, 1924)

Synonyms
- Phalarotarsa cirrophaea Meyrick, 1924

Species of moth

Costoma cirrophaea is a moth in the family Depressariidae. It was described by Edward Meyrick in 1924. It is found in Bolivia.

The wingspan is 26–28 mm. The forewings are ashy-ochreous grey with a narrow yellow basal fascia, edged posteriorly with ferruginous suffusion. From beyond this a rather broad light yellow costal stripe runs to near the apex and the dorsal and terminal edge are slenderly light yellow. The hindwings are yellow whitish, suffused pale grey posteriorly.
