= Osmarina =

Scientific classification
- Kingdom: Animalia
- Phylum: Arthropoda
- Class: Insecta
- Order: Lepidoptera
- Family: Depressariidae
- Subfamily: Depressariinae
- Genus: Osmarina; J. F. G. Clarke, 1978
- Species: O. argilla

Binomial name
- Osmarina argilla J. F. G. Clarke, 1978

Species of moth

Osmarina is a monotypic moth genus in the family Depressariidae. Its only species, Osmarina argilla, is found in Chile. Both the genus and species were described by John Frederick Gates Clarke in 1978.

The wingspan is 17–19 mm. The forewings are clay colored overlaid with brown scales and with a fuscous dot at the basal third, in the cell and followed at the end of the cell by a pair of similarly colored spots. In the fold is a similar small spot. The costa is narrowly pale buff and between the outer pair of the discal spots and termen, is a pale clay-colored, irregular, transverse line. Along the termen is a narrow broken fuscous line. The hindwings are grayish.
