= Muna zostera =

Scientific classification
- Kingdom: Animalia
- Phylum: Arthropoda
- Clade: Pancrustacea
- Class: Insecta
- Order: Lepidoptera
- Family: Depressariidae
- Subfamily: Depressariinae
- Genus: Muna; J. F. G. Clarke, 1978
- Species: M. zostera

Binomial name
- Muna zostera J. F. G. Clarke, 1978

Species of moth

Muna zostera is a moth in the family Depressariidae, and the only species in the genus Muna. Both the genus and species were described by John Frederick Gates Clarke in 1978. It is found in Chile.

The wingspan is about 21 mm. The forewings are light cinnamon brown with a violaceous tinge. At the basal third, two ill-defined fuscous spots are found, one in the cell, the other on the fold. From three-fifths of the costa, a broad straw-yellow transverse fascia extends outwardly to the middle of the wing, then curves inwardly to the middle of the dorsum. Both inner and outer edges of this fascia are irregularly marked with cinnamon-buff scales. Between the outer edge of the fascia and the termen, a series of five ill-defined, grayish-fuscous spots is found. The hindwings are ocherous white shading to very pale cinnamon brown at the apex.
