= Psittacastis trierica =

Scientific classification
- Kingdom: Animalia
- Phylum: Arthropoda
- Clade: Pancrustacea
- Class: Insecta
- Order: Lepidoptera
- Family: Depressariidae
- Genus: Psittacastis
- Species: P. trierica

Binomial name
- Psittacastis trierica Meyrick, 1909

Species of moth

Psittacastis trierica is a moth in the family Depressariidae. It was described by Edward Meyrick in 1909. It is found in Bolivia.

The wingspan is 14–16 mm. The forewings are ochreous brown, paler and whitish sprinkled towards the dorsum and with an oblique triangular spot of dark fuscous suffusion on the base of the dorsum, edged with whitish suffusion. There is a straight oblique streak composed of two ochreous-whitish lines separated by grey suffusion, running from one-fifth of the costa to the middle of the dorsum. A trapezoidal white spot is found on the costa before the middle, beneath suffused with whitish ochreous. Below this is a patch of dark grey suffusion containing a whitish-ochreous ring centred with dark fuscous. Two oblique white costal strigulae beyond the middle, the first giving rise to a very oblique bluish-leaden-metallic line dilated downwards, surrounded with orange-ferruginous suffusion, and terminating in a suffused white spot which almost reaches the terminal indentation, the second strigula finely black edged posteriorly and soon running into this line. An oval leaden-metallic spot is found in the disc at two-thirds, followed by a spot of ochreous-white suffusion. The tornal area is indistinctly streaked longitudinally with white and blackish irroration and a white spot occupying the tornal prominence, centred with a black dot. The apical prominence is whitish ochreous, separated by a dark fuscous spot from an inwardly oblique ochreous-whitish costal strigula, the costa between this and the preceding strigulae suffused with dark fuscous. The hindwings are grey, darker posteriorly.
