= Trycherodes =

Scientific classification
- Kingdom: Animalia
- Phylum: Arthropoda
- Class: Insecta
- Order: Lepidoptera
- Family: Depressariidae
- Subfamily: Depressariinae
- Genus: Trycherodes; Meyrick, 1914

Synonyms
- Teratomorpha Walsingham, 1912 (preocc.)

Genus of moths

Trycherodes is a moth genus of the family Depressariidae.

== Species ==
- Trycherodes albifrons (Walsingham, 1912)
- Trycherodes chilibrella (Busck, 1914)
- Trycherodes producta (Walsingham, 1912)
