= Gonada rubens =

Scientific classification
- Kingdom: Animalia
- Phylum: Arthropoda
- Class: Insecta
- Order: Lepidoptera
- Family: Depressariidae
- Genus: Gonada
- Species: G. rubens

Binomial name
- Gonada rubens Meyrick, 1916

Species of moth

Gonada rubens is a moth of the family Depressariidae. It is found in French Guiana.

The wingspan is about 20 mm. The forewings are deep ochreous-rosy, with a violet gloss and some scattered black specks in the disc. There is an indistinct fine pale ochreous median longitudinal line from near the base to beneath the apex. The plical and second discal stigmata are blackish, and there is also a less distinct small blackish dot above the second discal, and two obliquely beneath and beyond it. The hindwings are pale ochreous-rosy.
