= Psittacastis propriella =

Scientific classification
- Kingdom: Animalia
- Phylum: Arthropoda
- Class: Insecta
- Order: Lepidoptera
- Family: Depressariidae
- Genus: Psittacastis
- Species: P. propriella

Binomial name
- Psittacastis propriella (Walker, 1864)

Synonyms
- Gelechia propriella Walker, 1864

Species of moth

Psittacastis propriella is a moth in the family Depressariidae. It was described by Francis Walker in 1864. It is found in Brazil (Amazonas) and Guyana.

Adults are fawn coloured. The forewings are rounded at the tips, with two oblique silvery bands, one near the base, the other in the middle. There is an irregular ochraceous line along the interior border, and an ochraceous short broad subapical streak, which contains a little black line. The marginal space is mostly silvery. The hindwings are aeneous.
