= Euprionocera =

Scientific classification
- Kingdom: Animalia
- Phylum: Arthropoda
- Class: Insecta
- Order: Lepidoptera
- Family: Depressariidae
- Subfamily: Depressariinae
- Genus: Euprionocera; Turner, 1896
- Species: E. geminipuncta

Binomial name
- Euprionocera geminipuncta Turner, 1896

Synonyms
- Cryptolechia callisarca Meyrick, 1924

Species of moth

Euprionocera geminipuncta is a moth in the family Depressariidae, and the only species in the genus Euprionocera. It was described by Alfred Jefferis Turner in 1896 and is found in Australia, where it has been recorded from New South Wales.

The wingspan is about 27 mm. The forewings are light pink, with rows of minute dark grey dots on the veins and a small blackish subdorsal dot near the base. The discal stigmata are blackish, the first moderate and the second large. The hindwings are pale pink, anteriorly whitish-suffused.
