= Apachea =

Scientific classification
- Kingdom: Animalia
- Phylum: Arthropoda
- Class: Insecta
- Order: Lepidoptera
- Family: Depressariidae
- Subfamily: Depressariinae
- Genus: Apachea; Clarke, 1941
- Species: A. barberella

Binomial name
- Apachea barberella (Busck, 1902)

Synonyms
- Depressaria barberella Busck, 1902

Species of moth

Apachea barberella is a moth in the family Depressariidae, and the only species in the genus Apachea. It was described by August Busck in 1902. It is found in North America, where it has been recorded from Montana, Colorado, New Mexico, Arizona, Utah and California.

The wingspan is about 28 mm. The ground color of the forewings is light ocherous, dusted with fuscous, reddish and black scales. There is a thin deep black line from the base, parallel with the basal third of the costa. This line is edged on both sides with reddish brown. A narrow longitudinal white line starts just before this line ends. This line is interrupted by reddish brown scales. At the base of the wing, near the dorsal edge, a small black spot is found. The fold and veins are indicated by narrow black lines. At the end of the cell is a small round white dot, edged by black scales exteriorly and red scales interiorly. The hindwings are light ocherous fuscous, but whitish towards the base and darker fuscous along the edges and at the apex. Adults are on wing in winter.

The larvae feed on Ptelea angustifolia and Prunus species.

== Etymology ==
The species is named after its collector, Herbert Spencer Barber.
