= Nematochares =

Scientific classification
- Kingdom: Animalia
- Phylum: Arthropoda
- Class: Insecta
- Order: Lepidoptera
- Family: Depressariidae
- Subfamily: Depressariinae
- Genus: Nematochares; Meyrick, 1931
- Species: N. citraulax

Binomial name
- Nematochares citraulax Meyrick, 1931

Genus of moths

Nematochares is a monotypic moth genus in the family Depressariidae. Its only species, Nematochares citraulax, is found in Brazil. Both the genus and species were first described by Edward Meyrick in 1931.
