= Filinota cassiteranthes =

Scientific classification
- Kingdom: Animalia
- Phylum: Arthropoda
- Class: Insecta
- Order: Lepidoptera
- Family: Depressariidae
- Genus: Filinota
- Species: F. cassiteranthes

Binomial name
- Filinota cassiteranthes Meyrick, 1932

Synonyms
- Filinota crassitheranthes

Species of moth

Filinota cassiteranthes is a moth in the family Depressariidae. It was described by Edward Meyrick in 1932. It is found in Bolivia.
