= Psittacastis molybdaspis =

Scientific classification
- Domain: Eukaryota
- Kingdom: Animalia
- Phylum: Arthropoda
- Class: Insecta
- Order: Lepidoptera
- Family: Depressariidae
- Genus: Psittacastis
- Species: P. molybdaspis

Binomial name
- Psittacastis molybdaspis Meyrick, 1926

Species of moth

Psittacastis molybdaspis is a moth in the family Depressariidae. It was described by Edward Meyrick in 1926. It is found in Peru.

The wingspan is about 14 mm. The forewings are brown with a yellow ochreous blotch on the base of the costa terminating beneath in a very oblique slender projection and including a short oblique brownish streak near its posterior edge. A slender grey median streak, edged whitish beneath, is found from the base to two-fifths, then continued obliquely downwards but not reaching the dorsum. There is also a very oblique rhomboidal blue leaden blotch from the costa before the middle, and an oblique-oval blotch between this and the tornus, as well as an orange-yellow very oblique wedge-shaped spot from the costa beyond the middle, marked with two white strigulae on the costa, the first emitting a blue-leaden line terminating in an elongate spot in the disc towards the termen. An erect leaden mark from the tornus is preceded by two slight marks of while irroration and terminating above in a white dot. There is a blackish longitudinal mark before the apex, and some grey suffusion beneath this reaching the apex. The hindwings are grey becoming darker posteriorly.
