= Palinorsa raptans =

Scientific classification
- Kingdom: Animalia
- Phylum: Arthropoda
- Class: Insecta
- Order: Lepidoptera
- Family: Depressariidae
- Genus: Palinorsa
- Species: P. raptans

Binomial name
- Palinorsa raptans (Meyrick, 1920)

Synonyms
- Orsotricha raptans Meyrick, 1920

Species of moth

Palinorsa raptans is a moth in the family Depressariidae. It was described by Edward Meyrick in 1920. It is found in Peru and Brazil (Amazonas).

The wingspan is about 28 mm. The forewings are dark brown, with violet iridescence and a suffused dark fuscous median longitudinal streak from the base to the apex, and one along the fold to a spot beneath the middle of the wing followed by a white dot, between these a band of greyish-violet suffusion extends to the termen. There is a transverse suffused dark fuscous spot from the upper margin of the median streak at three-fifths. The hindwings are grey, paler and subhyaline towards the base.
