= Psittacastis cocae =

Scientific classification
- Domain: Eukaryota
- Kingdom: Animalia
- Phylum: Arthropoda
- Class: Insecta
- Order: Lepidoptera
- Family: Depressariidae
- Genus: Psittacastis
- Species: P. cocae

Binomial name
- Psittacastis cocae (Busck, 1931)

Synonyms
- Eucleodora cocae Busck, 1931

Species of moth

Psittacastis cocae is a moth in the family Depressariidae. August Busck described it in 1931. It is found in Peru.

The larvae feed on the leaves of Erythroxylon coca.
