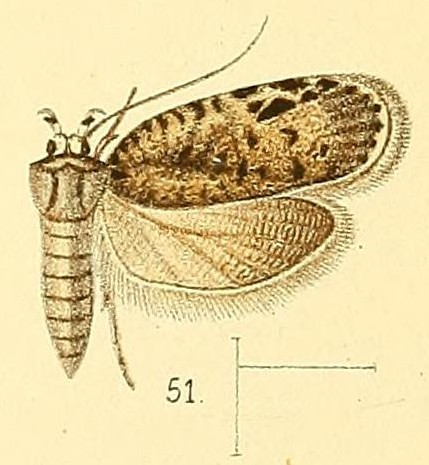
- Ptilobola inornatella (Walsingham, 1891)

Scientific classification
- Kingdom: Animalia
- Phylum: Arthropoda
- Class: Insecta
- Order: Lepidoptera
- Family: Depressariidae
- Subfamily: Depressariinae
- Genus: Ptilobola; Meyrick, 1933
- Species: P. inornatella

Binomial name
- Ptilobola inornatella (Walsingham, 1891)

Synonyms
- Depressaria inornatella Walsingham, 1891

= Ptilobola =

Species of moth

Ptilobola inornatella is a moth in the family Depressariidae, and the only species in the genus Ptilobola. It was described by Walsingham in 1891 and is found in Gambia and Ghana.

The wingspan is about 17 mm. The forewings are cinereous, much spotted, sprinkled, and suffused with tawny fuscous, without the indication of any characteristic pattern or marking, except a small patch of dark tawny fuscous scales at the extreme base of the dorsal margin, and a dark tawny fuscous elongate oblique spot lying above and beyond the outer and upper angle of the cell, but not reaching to the costal margin, preceding and following this are two obscure costal spots of the same colour, and a smaller one lies obliquely between the preceding costal spot and the base of the elongate spot first mentioned. These, as well as a few other small costal and marginal spots, are very indistinct. There is also a faint indication of the usual dark spot on the end of the cell. The hindwings are pale cinereous.

The larvae feed on Citrus species.
