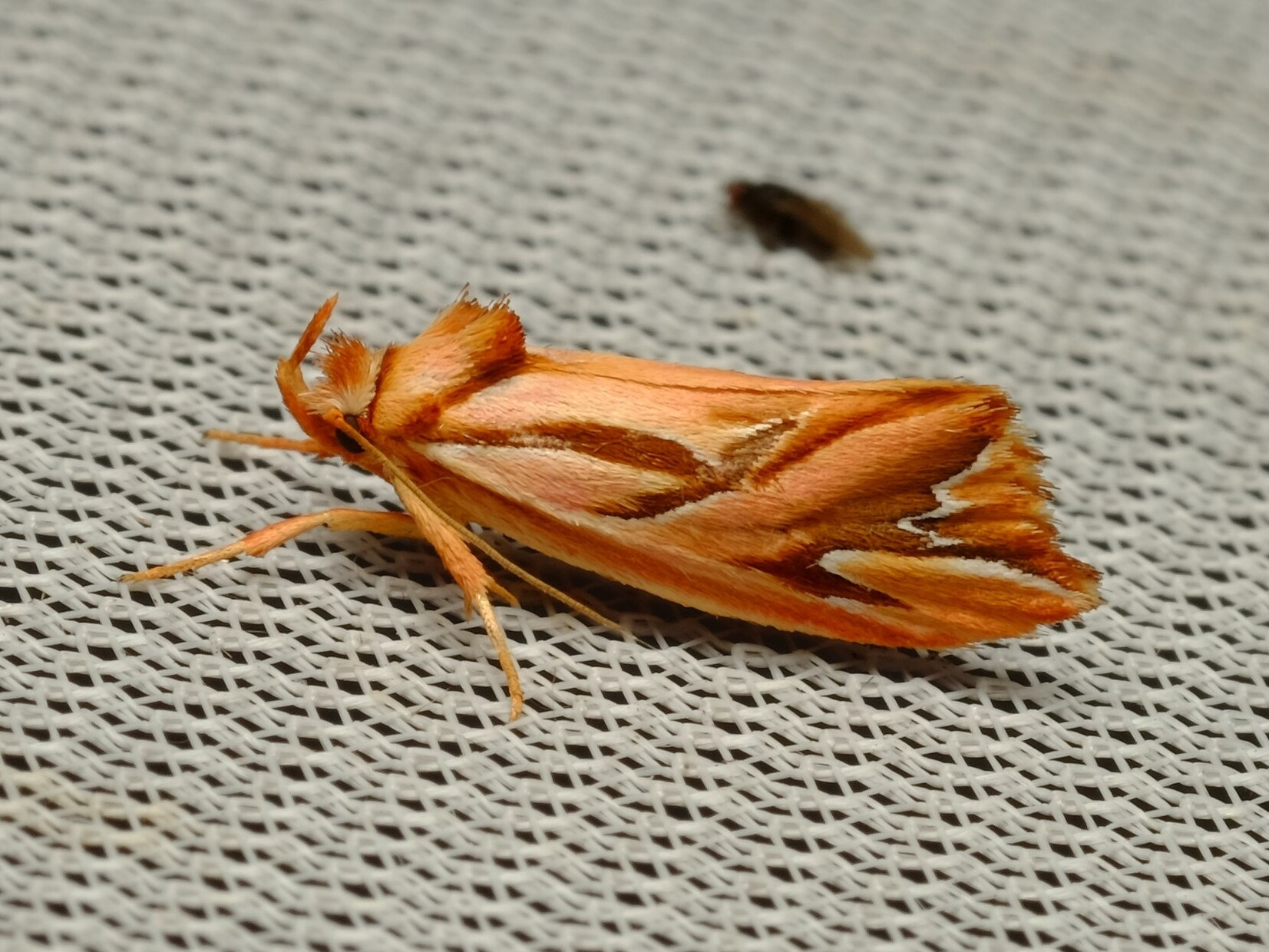

Scientific classification
- Kingdom: Animalia
- Phylum: Arthropoda
- Class: Insecta
- Order: Lepidoptera
- Family: Depressariidae
- Subfamily: Depressariinae
- Genus: Eclecta; Meyrick, 1883
- Species: E. aurorella

Binomial name
- Eclecta aurorella Meyrick, 1883

= Eclecta =

Eclecta aurorella

Genus of moths

Eclecta is a monotypic moth genus in the family Depressariidae. Its only species, Eclecta aurorella, has been found in the Australian state of New South Wales. Both the genus and species were first described by Edward Meyrick in 1883.

== Description ==
The wingspan is 18.5-19.5 mm. The forewings are rather light crimson pink with the extreme costal edge whitish from near the base to three-fourths and a suffused dark fuscous subcostal streak from the base to about one-third, posteriorly indistinct. There is a short dark reddish-fuscous dash on the inner margin at the base, indistinctly margined above with whitish and a dark reddish-fuscous basally attenuated longitudinal streak from the base to a little below the middle of the disc, then bent obliquely downwards, not reaching the inner margin, the angle filled up beneath with whitish ochreous, the streak margined above from the base to the angle with white and there is a dark reddish-fuscous oblique streak from the disc slightly above the middle at two-fifths from the base to the anal angle, posteriorly attenuated, interrupted above the angle of the discal streak, with which it is almost confluent, margined posteriorly with white, and its discal extremity connected with the base of the wing by a slender white line. There is an irregularly triangular dark reddish-fuscous blotch, more ochreous fuscous beneath, on the hindmargin, its apex extending to the disc at three-fifths from the base, its base extending from above the anal angle to beneath the apex, the lower side suffused, upperside connected in the disc with a dark reddish-fuscous acute diamond-shaped mark beneath the costa, beyond the connection margined with white. Within this triangle is a slender white twice sharply toothed line proceeding from the middle of the upperside to the lower angle, and two small indistinct whitish spots on the hindmargin. The hindwings are ochreous whitish, crimson tinged.
