= Doina phaeobregma =

Scientific classification
- Kingdom: Animalia
- Phylum: Arthropoda
- Class: Insecta
- Order: Lepidoptera
- Family: Depressariidae
- Genus: Doina
- Species: D. phaeobregma

Binomial name
- Doina phaeobregma J. F. G. Clarke, 1978

Species of moth

Doina phaeobregma is a moth in the family Depressariidae. It was described by John Frederick Gates Clarke in 1978. It is found in Chile.

The wingspan is 20–23 mm. The forewings are light Brussels brown with a rufous costa on the extreme edge. There are twelve tiny salmon-buff spots from the apical half of the costa, around the termen to the tornus, and in the middle of the cell, a fuscous spot is found. On the fold is a similarly colored, larger spot, and a short fuscous transverse dash is found at the end of the cell. Toward the subterminal region, five fuscous spots are present, each preceded inwardly by buff scales, and the termen has a narrow fuscous edge. The hindwings are very pale grayish fuscous.
