= Filinota gratiosa =

Scientific classification
- Kingdom: Animalia
- Phylum: Arthropoda
- Clade: Pancrustacea
- Class: Insecta
- Order: Lepidoptera
- Family: Depressariidae
- Genus: Filinota
- Species: F. gratiosa

Binomial name
- Filinota gratiosa (C. Felder, R. Felder & Rogenhofer, 1875)

Synonyms
- Lecithocera gratiosa Felder & Rogenhofer, 1875; Filinota peruviella Busck, 1911

Species of moth

Filinota gratiosa is a moth in the family Depressariidae. It was described by Cajetan Felder, Rudolf Felder and Alois Friedrich Rogenhofer in 1875. It is found in Venezuela, Brazil and Peru.

The wingspan is about 17 mm. The forewings are light yellow with carmine and blackish-brown streaks. The base of the costal edge is carmine, and there are three longitudinal carmine lines on the basal part of the wing. A narrow blackish-brown line shaped like a V runs from the basal fourth of the costa to the middle of the dorsum and back to the apical third of the costa. This line is lightly edged with carmine. Across the tip of the wing runs a similar brown line, also edged with carmine, parallel with the outer leg of the V and connected with it by two longitudinal, somewhat oblique carmine lines. The hindwings are silvery white.
