= Fuchsia luteella =

Scientific classification
- Kingdom: Animalia
- Phylum: Arthropoda
- Clade: Pancrustacea
- Class: Insecta
- Order: Lepidoptera
- Family: Depressariidae
- Genus: Fuchsia
- Species: F. luteella

Binomial name
- Fuchsia luteella (Heinemann, 1870)

Synonyms
- Oecophora luteella Heinemann, 1870

Species of moth

Fuchsia luteella is a species of moth of the family Depressariidae. It is found in the Czech Republic, Slovakia, Austria, Romania and North Macedonia.

The larvae feed on Peucedanum cervaria.
