= Palinorsa acritomorpha =

Scientific classification
- Domain: Eukaryota
- Kingdom: Animalia
- Phylum: Arthropoda
- Class: Insecta
- Order: Lepidoptera
- Family: Depressariidae
- Genus: Palinorsa
- Species: P. acritomorpha

Binomial name
- Palinorsa acritomorpha Clarke, 1964

Species of moth

Palinorsa acritomorpha is a moth in the family Depressariidae. It was described by Clarke in 1964. It is found in Peru.

The wingspan is 33–36 mm. The forewings are cinnamon with the extreme costa, before the apex, whitish. There is a small fuscous spot in the cell at one-third and an ill-defined transverse fuscous bar at the end of the cell. On each side of vein Ic, opposite the base of vein 2, there is a buff spot narrowly edged with fuscous and the dorsum and termen are narrowly fuscous. The hindwings are semi-hyaline whitish.
