= Fuchsia huertasi =

Scientific classification
- Kingdom: Animalia
- Phylum: Arthropoda
- Clade: Pancrustacea
- Class: Insecta
- Order: Lepidoptera
- Family: Depressariidae
- Genus: Fuchsia
- Species: F. huertasi

Binomial name
- Fuchsia huertasi Vives, 1995

Species of moth

Fuchsia huertasi is a species of moth of the family Depressariidae. It is found in Spain.
