= Doina truncata =

Scientific classification
- Kingdom: Animalia
- Phylum: Arthropoda
- Class: Insecta
- Order: Lepidoptera
- Family: Depressariidae
- Genus: Doina
- Species: D. truncata

Binomial name
- Doina truncata J. F. G. Clarke, 1978

Species of moth

Doina truncata is a moth in the family Depressariidae. It was described by John Frederick Gates Clarke in 1978. It is found in Chile.

The wingspan is 16–22 mm. The forewings are light ochraceous, with buff shading to ochraceous tawny before a broad light buff terminal area. The outer half of the wing is very sparsely irrorated (sprinkled) with fuscous. On the costa, just before the apex, there is an ill-defined, tiny fuscous dot. Along the termen is a series of five fuscous spots and lying on the tornal edge is a blackish streak. The hindwings are pale greyish fuscous, paler basally. On the termen are three or four ill-defined fuscous spots and the apical portion of the wing is speckled with fuscous.
