= Psittacastis championella =

Scientific classification
- Domain: Eukaryota
- Kingdom: Animalia
- Phylum: Arthropoda
- Class: Insecta
- Order: Lepidoptera
- Family: Depressariidae
- Genus: Psittacastis
- Species: P. championella

Binomial name
- Psittacastis championella (Walsingham, 1912)

Synonyms
- Necedes championella Walsingham, 1912

Species of moth

Psittacastis championella is a moth in the family Depressariidae. It was described by Lord Walsingham in 1912. It is found in Guatemala.

The wingspan is about 16 mm. The forewings are fawn brown, with some whitish ochreous mottling near the base of the costa, and on either side of the base of the fold. A very pale whitish ochreous oblique streak, from the middle of the costa, nearly meets at its apex an oblique, slender, silvery line, leaving the costa a little beyond it, and some silvery scales precede the termen below the apex. The apex is somewhat caudate, the cilia above and below it pale whitish ochreous, a fawn-brown line running through them at right angles to a projecting point, which seems to take its origin from a brown apical spot, the outline of the wing being also marked by a slender dark brown marginal line. The dorsal and terminal portions of the wing are somewhat paler than the central, costal, and discal areas. The hindwings are brownish cinereous.
