= Filinota dictyota =

Scientific classification
- Domain: Eukaryota
- Kingdom: Animalia
- Phylum: Arthropoda
- Class: Insecta
- Order: Lepidoptera
- Family: Depressariidae
- Genus: Filinota
- Species: F. dictyota

Binomial name
- Filinota dictyota (Walsingham, 1912)

Synonyms
- Mnesichara dictyota Walsingham, 1912

Species of moth

Filinota dictyota is a moth in the family Depressariidae. It was described by Thomas de Grey in 1912. It is found in Guatemala.

The wingspan is about 24 mm. The forewings are bright yellow, streaked throughout longitudinally and obliquely with bright rosy red, narrowly margined around the apex and termen with yellowish brown, which is continued along the costa to the middle, then expanding and diverging obliquely to the dorsum at one-fourth, along which it is produced to the base. In crossing the cell this band is somewhat dilated into the form of a quadrate patch, resting on the middle of the fold and sending off a short branch from its inner and upper angle to the costa at one-third, where it is somewhat dilated, but does not reach the base. A small kidney-shaped ocellate patch of yellowish brown lies at the end of the cell, emitting a short branch to the tornus, and a small tooth-shaped projection is emitted from the dark costal shade at the commencement of the costal cilia. The hindwings are yellowish white, with a slightly iridescent pinkish glow.
