= Phytomimia =

Scientific classification
- Domain: Eukaryota
- Kingdom: Animalia
- Phylum: Arthropoda
- Class: Insecta
- Order: Lepidoptera
- Family: Depressariidae
- Subfamily: Depressariinae
- Genus: Phytomimia; Walsingham, 1912
- Species: P. chlorophylla

Binomial name
- Phytomimia chlorophylla Walsingham, 1912

Synonyms
- Phytomimia redundans Walsingham, 1912; Phytomimia silvicolor Meyrick, 1932; Phytomimia cynegetis Meyrick, 1932; Phytomimia pyrrhophthalma Meyrick, 1932

Species of moth

Phytomimia chlorophylla is a moth in the family Depressariidae, and the only species in the genus Phytomimia. It was described by Thomas de Grey, 6th Baron Walsingham, in 1912 and is found in Mexico, Guatemala, Panama, Costa Rica and Peru.

The wingspan is about 18 mm. The forewings are bright grass-green, the costa narrowly flesh-coloured throughout. A slender, oblique, flesh-coloured line before the termen crosses the veins, but does not reach the margins and a single dot of black scales is found on the disc at the end of the cell. The hindwings are pearly white.
