= Lucyna fenestella =

Scientific classification
- Kingdom: Animalia
- Phylum: Arthropoda
- Clade: Pancrustacea
- Class: Insecta
- Order: Lepidoptera
- Family: Depressariidae
- Genus: Lucyna
- Species: L. fenestella

Binomial name
- Lucyna fenestella (Zeller, 1874)

Synonyms
- Cryptolechia fenestella Zeller, 1874; Coptotelia thyridopa Meyrick, 1912

Species of moth

Lucyna fenestella is a moth in the family Depressariidae. It was described by Philipp Christoph Zeller in 1874. It is found in Chile.
