= Filinota rhodograpta =

Scientific classification
- Kingdom: Animalia
- Phylum: Arthropoda
- Class: Insecta
- Order: Lepidoptera
- Family: Depressariidae
- Genus: Filinota
- Species: F. rhodograpta

Binomial name
- Filinota rhodograpta Meyrick, 1915

Species of moth

Filinota rhodograpta is a moth in the family Depressariidae. It was described by Edward Meyrick in 1915. It is found in Guyana and Pará, Brazil.

The wingspan is about 17 mm. The forewings are dark grey with a brassy-golden-yellow streak along the costa interrupted by ground colour at one-fourth, its lower edge with a projection in the middle terminated by a crimson dot, continued around the apex and termen to below the middle and then curved in along vein 3 to the angle of the cell. Beyond the cell is an elongate silvery-white patch edged with crimson and there are erect triangular silvery-white blotches edged with crimson on the dorsum at one-fourth and before the termen, reaching more than half across the wing. Between these is an irregular-oval yellow blotch in the disc, edged beneath by a crimson mark. The hindwings are white.
