= Rhindoma =

Scientific classification
- Kingdom: Animalia
- Phylum: Arthropoda
- Class: Insecta
- Order: Lepidoptera
- Family: Depressariidae
- Subfamily: Depressariinae
- Genus: Rhindoma; Busck, 1914
- Species: R. rosapicella

Binomial name
- Rhindoma rosapicella Busck, 1914

Species of moth

Rhindoma rosapicella is a moth in the family Depressariidae, and the only species in the genus Rhindoma. It was described by August Busck in 1914 and is found in Panama.

The wingspan is 12–13 mm. The forewings have a large blackish brown dorsal patch, reaching to the end of the cell. The costal area above this patch and terminal area beyond it are light ochreous and there is an elongate blackish brown costal streak at the apical third, edged toward the base with orange scales and apically with light rose-colored scales. These latter persist in a narrow band around the apex and include a dark brown subapical spot. A few rose-colored scales are also found below the costal spot and an indistinct and ill-defined orange streak crosses the apical light ochreous area. The hindwings are dark brownish fuscous, with a rose-colored tip.
