= Psittacastis stigmaphylli =

Scientific classification
- Domain: Eukaryota
- Kingdom: Animalia
- Phylum: Arthropoda
- Class: Insecta
- Order: Lepidoptera
- Family: Depressariidae
- Genus: Psittacastis
- Species: P. stigmaphylli

Binomial name
- Psittacastis stigmaphylli (Walsingham, 1912)

Synonyms
- Necedes stigmaphylli Walsingham, 1912; Necedes stigmaphylli var. brevipalpis Walsingham, 1912

Species of moth

Psittacastis stigmaphylli is a moth in the family Depressariidae. It was described by Lord Walsingham in 1912. It is found on Jamaica.

The wingspan is 11–12 mm. The forewings are pale brownish ochreous, suffused with dark chestnut brown, especially at the nexus, on the oblique cuneiform fascia at one-fourth, on the end of the cell, and along the costa before the apex. From the base of the costa a mottled and streaky pale greyish shade extends obliquely outward to the dorsum at one-third, containing some brown spots. This is followed by the suffused cuneiform fascia which sends out two points on its outer side, one along the dorsum and one above it, the upper one bounding the lower edge of a conspicuous whitish costal patch also dilated outward at its lower edge, and there somewhat tinged with ochreous. This contains on the cell a blackish dot. The suffused patch which succeeds it is connected to the costa by a rather paler chestnut-brown shade, through which runs a steely grey streak, starting from a white costal speck and meeting at its outer end a narrow whitish streak, also from the costa—these both merge in a pale yellowish ochreous patch beyond the end of the cell. Other steely grey scales and pale streaks pass through an elongate suffused patch lying on the dorsum below the pale ochreous patch, while above it, but separated by a line of blackish scales, the subcostal area is suffused with dark chestnut brown nearly to the apex, the costal edge alone being pale ochreous, continued as a median streak at the base of the brownish cilia in the unciform apex. Below the subapical incision is a pale ochreous, or almost whitish, patch on the termen, margined on its inner side by steely grey scales, and on its outer edge on the base of the cilia by parallel brown lines. The hindwings are grey.

The larvae feed on the leaves of Stigmaphyllon emarginatum, rolling the edges of these leaves. The larvae are pale greenish white, with slight indications of ochreous longitudinal lines. The spots are blackish and distinct, each emitting a rather long blackish hair. The head and pronotal plates are pale yellowish, with several small black spots. They reach a length of about 9 mm.
