= Costoma basirosella =

Scientific classification
- Kingdom: Animalia
- Phylum: Arthropoda
- Clade: Pancrustacea
- Class: Insecta
- Order: Lepidoptera
- Family: Depressariidae
- Genus: Costoma
- Species: C. basirosella

Binomial name
- Costoma basirosella Busck, 1914

Species of moth

Costoma basirosella is a moth in the family Depressariidae. It was described by August Busck in 1914. It is found in Panama.

The wingspan is about 31 mm. The base of the forewings are light pink, on the costa yellow. This bright colored base is sharply limited outwardly by a narrow, blackish-brown, transverse fascia. Beyond this fascia, the wing is dark olive brown with the costal edge from the basal fourth outwardly, broadly yellow, and with the entire apical, terminal, and dorsal edge narrowly yellow. The hindwings are dark brownish fuscous.
