= Iphimachaera =

Scientific classification
- Kingdom: Animalia
- Phylum: Arthropoda
- Class: Insecta
- Order: Lepidoptera
- Family: Depressariidae
- Subfamily: Depressariinae
- Genus: Iphimachaera; Meyrick, 1931
- Species: I. picticollis

Binomial name
- Iphimachaera picticollis (Walsingham, 1912)

Synonyms
- Mnesichara picticollis Walsingham, 1912; Iphimachaera decapitata Meyrick, 1931

Species of moth

Iphimachaera picticollis is a moth in the family Depressariidae, and the only species in the genus Iphimachaera. It was described by Thomas de Grey in 1912 and is found in Brazil and Panama.

The wingspan is about 19 mm. The forewings are yellowish brown, minutely sprinkled with whitish ochreous scales, especially towards the apex. Along and below the fold, from near the base, is a slight carmine suffusion, and before the middle of the wing a broad reddish ochreous patch, commencing on the costa, is attenuate on the cell, somewhat expanding again to its termination on the fold, its sinuate inner margin well defined throughout. The hindwings are yellowish grey.
