= Filinota sphenoplecta =

Scientific classification
- Domain: Eukaryota
- Kingdom: Animalia
- Phylum: Arthropoda
- Class: Insecta
- Order: Lepidoptera
- Family: Depressariidae
- Genus: Filinota
- Species: F. sphenoplecta

Binomial name
- Filinota sphenoplecta Meyrick, 1921

Species of moth

Filinota sphenoplecta is a moth in the family Depressariidae. It was described by Edward Meyrick in 1921. It is found in Brazil.

The wingspan is about 15 mm. The forewings are light yellow with a dark grey streak along the costa from the base to three-fourths, and dark grey streaks from the costa at one-third and two-thirds converging to the dorsum at two-thirds, all edged with crimson. A slender crimson streak is found from the dorsum near the base to the fold and then along the fold nearly to the first transverse streak. There are also slender crimson streaks from the second transverse streak above and below the middle to below the apex and below the middle of the termen respectively. A slender crimson marginal streak is found around the costa posteriorly and the termen to the lower of these. The hindwings are ochreous whitish, towards the apex more ochreous tinged.
