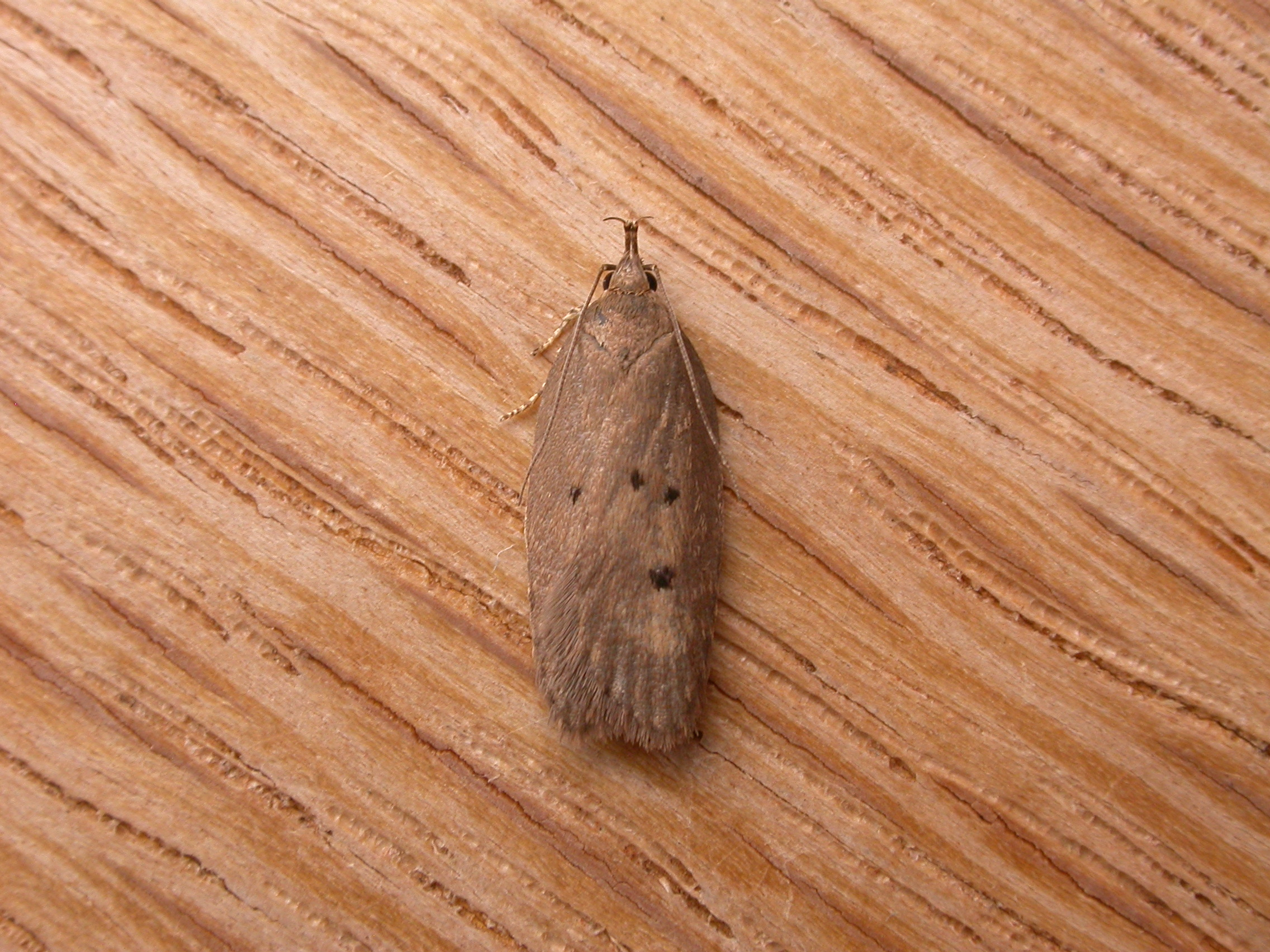

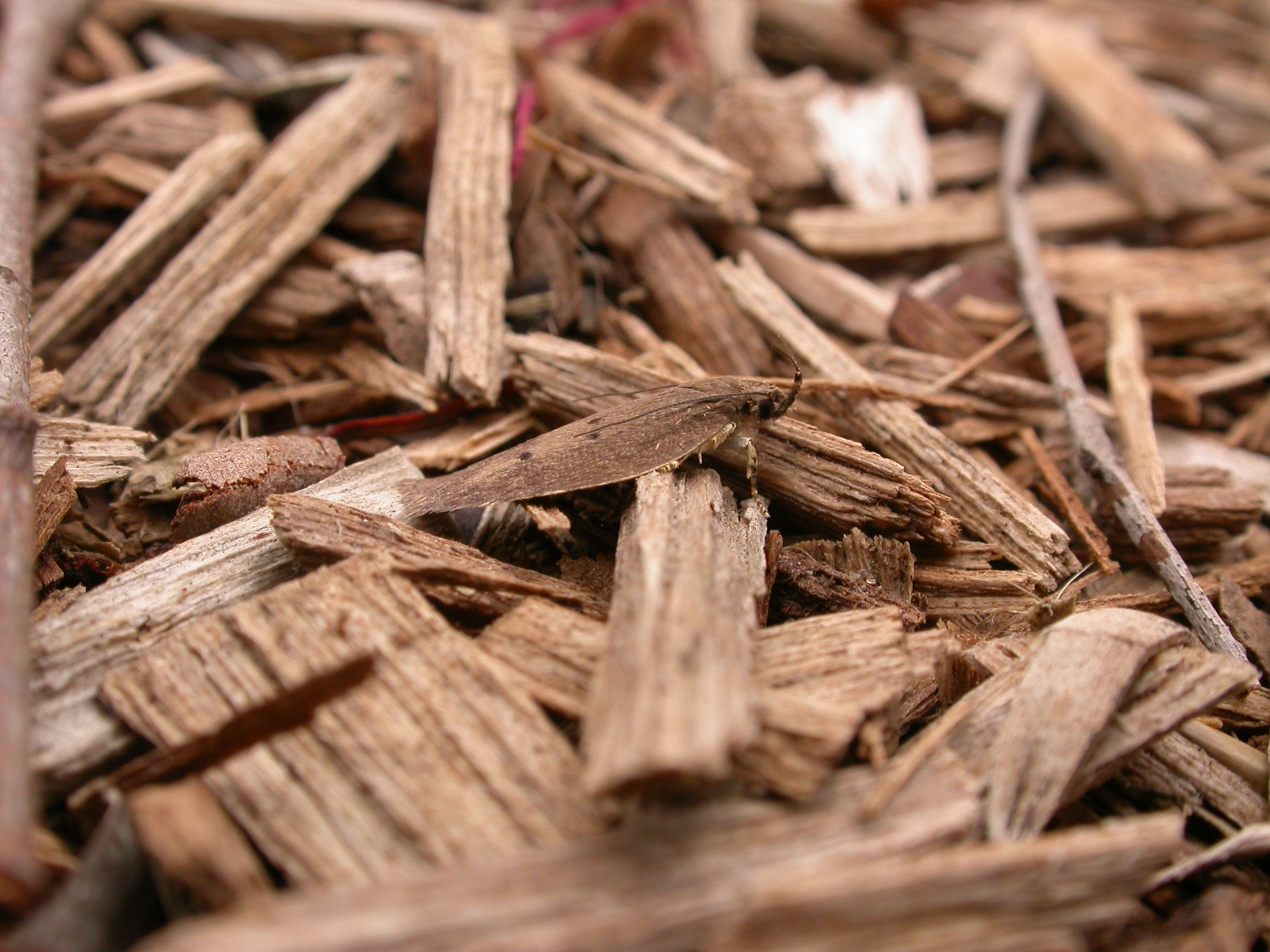

Scientific classification
- Kingdom: Animalia
- Phylum: Arthropoda
- Clade: Pancrustacea
- Class: Insecta
- Order: Lepidoptera
- Family: Depressariidae
- Subfamily: Depressariinae
- Genus: Doleromima; Meyrick, 1902
- Species: D. hypoxantha

Binomial name
- Doleromima hypoxantha (Lower, 1897)

Synonyms
- Oecophora hypoxantha Lower, 1897; Pedois eumorpha Turner, 1900; Doleromima eumorpha Meyrick, 1902

= Doleromima =

Species of moth

Doleromima hypoxantha is a moth of the family Depressariidae. It is found in Australia, where it has been recorded from New South Wales, Victoria and Tasmania.

The wingspan is about 20 mm.
