= Psittacastis pyrsophanes =

Scientific classification
- Kingdom: Animalia
- Phylum: Arthropoda
- Class: Insecta
- Order: Lepidoptera
- Family: Depressariidae
- Genus: Psittacastis
- Species: P. pyrsophanes

Binomial name
- Psittacastis pyrsophanes Meyrick, 1936

Species of moth

Psittacastis pyrsophanes is a moth in the family Depressariidae. It was described by Edward Meyrick in 1936. It is found in Peru.
