= Psittacastis argentata =

Scientific classification
- Kingdom: Animalia
- Phylum: Arthropoda
- Clade: Pancrustacea
- Class: Insecta
- Order: Lepidoptera
- Family: Depressariidae
- Genus: Psittacastis
- Species: P. argentata

Binomial name
- Psittacastis argentata Meyrick, 1921

Species of moth

Psittacastis argentata is a moth in the family Depressariidae. It was described by Edward Meyrick in 1921. It is found in Brazil.

The wingspan is about 13 mm. The forewings are ferruginous with a whitish-grey ochreous streak from the costa near the base to a leaden spot above the dorsum at two-fifths, a greyish streak from the base along the fold to this. There is also an oblique trapezoidal blue-leaden-metallic patch resting on the middle of the costa, one angle reaching two-thirds across the wing, the other projecting near the costa posteriorly. There is an extremely fine very oblique leaden striga from the costa near beyond this to a very oblique blue-leaden striga in the disc at four-fifths, a blackish dash and some dark fuscous suffusion in the disc between this and the preceding patch, and some dark fuscous suffusion in the disc before the patch. There is also a streak of leaden suffusion along the posterior fourth of the fold and a fine blackish line towards the apex, as well as two small spots of bluish suffusion transversely placed above the tornus. The hindwings are dark grey.
