= Psittacastis superatella =

Scientific classification
- Kingdom: Animalia
- Phylum: Arthropoda
- Class: Insecta
- Order: Lepidoptera
- Family: Depressariidae
- Genus: Psittacastis
- Species: P. superatella

Binomial name
- Psittacastis superatella (Walker, 1864)

Synonyms
- Gelechia superatella Walker, 1864; Oecophora ambigua Felder & Rogenhofer, 1875

Species of moth

Psittacastis superatella is a moth in the family Depressariidae. It was described by Francis Walker in 1864. It is found in Brazil (Amazonas) and Peru.

Adults are ferruginous, the forewings slightly acute, moderately broad, with two irregular oblique silvery bauds, the first band near the base and the second in the middle. There is a double silvery line extending from the costa to one-third of the breadth, more oblique than the second band. Some ochraceous streaks are found between the second band and the exterior border, accompanied by black and silvery marks. The hindwings are aeneous cinereous (brass and ash coloured).
