= Comotechna =

Scientific classification
- Kingdom: Animalia
- Phylum: Arthropoda
- Class: Insecta
- Order: Lepidoptera
- Family: Depressariidae
- Subfamily: Depressariinae
- Genus: Comotechna; Meyrick, 1920

Genus of moths

Comotechna is a moth genus of the family Depressariidae.

== Species ==
- Comotechna corculata Meyrick, 1921
- Comotechna dentifera Meyrick, 1921
- Comotechna ludicra Meyrick, 1920
- Comotechna parmifera Meyrick, 1921
- Comotechna scutulata Meyrick, 1921
- Comotechna semiberbis Meyrick, 1921
