= Hamadera =

Scientific classification
- Domain: Eukaryota
- Kingdom: Animalia
- Phylum: Arthropoda
- Class: Insecta
- Order: Lepidoptera
- Family: Depressariidae
- Subfamily: Depressariinae
- Genus: Hamadera; Busck, 1914
- Species: H. aurea

Binomial name
- Hamadera aurea Busck, 1914

Species of moth

Hamadera aurea is a moth in the family Depressariidae, and the only species in the genus Hamadera. It was described by August Busck in 1914 and is found in Panama.

The wingspan is 11–12 mm. The basal half of the forewings is deep black, with a broad, semicircular, metallic blue band from near the base to just before the middle of the costa. The ends of this band on the very edge are white and there is a large, contiguous, metallic blue spot on the fold near the base and another similar one on the middle of the fold, neither reaching the dorsal edge. The apical half of the wing is deep golden yellow, which color sends a broad projection into the dark basal part on the middle of the cell. The extreme tip of the wing and a slender projection therefrom into the yellow part dark violaceous, strongly metallic and iridescent. The hindwings are blackish brown with the costal edge above vein 8 silvery white.
