= Doina increta =

Scientific classification
- Kingdom: Animalia
- Phylum: Arthropoda
- Class: Insecta
- Order: Lepidoptera
- Family: Depressariidae
- Genus: Doina
- Species: D. increta

Binomial name
- Doina increta (Butler, 1883)

Synonyms
- Orthotelia increta Butler, 1883

Species of moth

Doina increta is a moth in the family Depressariidae. It was described by Arthur Gardiner Butler in 1883. It is found in Chile.

The wingspan is about 30 mm. The forewings are coffee brown, shining, with a feeble lilac gloss and with the costal margin dull red. The external border is dusky and the fringe is traversed by two black stripes and tipped with pink, which gives place to snow white at the external angle. The discoidal spots are indicated in dark brown and there is a slightly curved transverse discal series of white-dotted dark brown dashes. The hindwings are shining grey with the costa and fringe whitish, the latter traversed by two indistinct grey stripes. There is a yellowish line along the outer margin.
