= Filinota =

Scientific classification
- Kingdom: Animalia
- Phylum: Arthropoda
- Clade: Pancrustacea
- Class: Insecta
- Order: Lepidoptera
- Family: Depressariidae
- Subfamily: Depressariinae
- Genus: Filinota; Busck, 1911

Synonyms
- Lupercalia Busck, 1912; Mnesichara Walsingham, 1912

Genus of moths

Filinota is a moth genus of the family Depressariidae.

== Species ==
- Filinota cassiteranthes Meyrick, 1932
- Filinota dictyota (Walsingham, 1912)
- Filinota gratiosa (Felder & Rogenhofer, 1875)
- Filinota hermosella Busck, 1911
- Filinota ignita (Busck, 1912)
- Filinota ithymetra Meyrick, 1926
- Filinota lamprocosma Meyrick, 1916
- Filinota regifica Meyrick, 1921
- Filinota rhodograpta Meyrick, 1915
- Filinota sphenoplecta Meyrick, 1921
- Filinota vociferans Meyrick, 1930
