= Comotechna ludicra =

Scientific classification
- Domain: Eukaryota
- Kingdom: Animalia
- Phylum: Arthropoda
- Class: Insecta
- Order: Lepidoptera
- Family: Depressariidae
- Genus: Comotechna
- Species: C. ludicra

Binomial name
- Comotechna ludicra Meyrick, 1920

Species of moth

Comotechna ludicra is a moth in the family Depressariidae. It was described by Edward Meyrick in 1920. It is found in Guyana.

The wingspan is 10–11 mm. The forewings are rather dark grey with the costal area from the base to a small transverse whitish spot at three-fourths suffused with whitish, towards the base with one or two very oblique grey lines, in the middle with a very oblique yellow-ochreous streak edged with dark grey and beyond this an oblique dark grey wedge-shaped mark. Beneath this is a yellow-whitish longitudinal line from the base nearly to the middle more or less developed and there is a rather oblique slightly incurved dark fuscous obscurely whitish-edged narrow fasciate streak from the dorsum at one-fourth crossing two-thirds of the wing, and a similar more strongly marked and broader streak from the middle of the dorsum. A third is found from three-fourths, it is only indicated by whitish marginal suffusion and is shorter. There is also some whitish-ochreous mottling in the disc towards the termen and a leaden-grey shade crosses the wing obliquely from the costa before the apex to the termen, then along the termen to the tornus, where it is preceded by an elongate dark fuscous mark. The hindwings are dark fuscous, somewhat lighter towards the base, appearing finely granulated.
