= Erithyma cyanoplecta =

Scientific classification
- Kingdom: Animalia
- Phylum: Arthropoda
- Class: Insecta
- Order: Lepidoptera
- Family: Depressariidae
- Genus: Erithyma
- Species: E. cyanoplecta

Binomial name
- Erithyma cyanoplecta Meyrick, 1914

Species of moth

Erithyma cyanoplecta is a moth in the family Depressariidae. It was described by Edward Meyrick in 1914. It is found in Guyana.

The wingspan is 11–12 mm. The forewings are blackish with narrow indigo-blue-metallic transverse fasciae at one-fifth and before the middle, the second furcate (forked) towards the dorsum. There are two white dots on the costa at three-fifths and two-thirds, the first terminated beneath by a blue-metallic dot, a small ochreous subcostal spot between these. There is a transverse-linear white mark in the disc at three-fifths and the dorsum is tinged with ferruginous ochreous towards two-thirds. There is a violet-leaden-metallic patch extending over the termen and tornus. The hindwings are dark fuscous.
