= Athrinacia psephophragma =

Scientific classification
- Domain: Eukaryota
- Kingdom: Animalia
- Phylum: Arthropoda
- Class: Insecta
- Order: Lepidoptera
- Family: Depressariidae
- Genus: Athrinacia
- Species: A. psephophragma

Binomial name
- Athrinacia psephophragma Meyrick, 1929

Species of moth

Athrinacia psephophragma is a moth in the family Depressariidae. It was described by Edward Meyrick in 1929. It is found in Brazil.
