= Psittacastis eurychrysa =

Scientific classification
- Kingdom: Animalia
- Phylum: Arthropoda
- Class: Insecta
- Order: Lepidoptera
- Family: Depressariidae
- Genus: Psittacastis
- Species: P. eurychrysa

Binomial name
- Psittacastis eurychrysa Meyrick, 1909

Species of moth

Psittacastis eurychrysa is a moth in the family Depressariidae. It was described by Edward Meyrick in 1909. It is found in Bolivia.

The wingspan is 9–10 mm. The forewings are blackish, suffused with deep bronzy except towards the costa and with a purple-golden subbasal fascia, diluted dorsally so as to reach the base. There is a moderate slightly curved purple-golden fascia somewhat before the middle, followed by an orange band which is broadest in the middle and contracted so as to leave a narrow spot of ground colour between them towards the costa, the outer edge of this band strongly curved. An orange streak is found along the costa from near beyond this band to the apex and the terminal and tornal area beyond this band is wholly purple-golden metallic. The hindwings are dark fuscous.
