= Perzelia =

Scientific classification
- Kingdom: Animalia
- Phylum: Arthropoda
- Class: Insecta
- Order: Lepidoptera
- Family: Depressariidae
- Subfamily: Depressariinae
- Genus: Perzelia; J. F. G. Clarke, 1978
- Species: P. arda

Binomial name
- Perzelia arda J. F. G. Clarke, 1978

Species of moth

Perzelia is a monotypic moth genus in the family Depressariidae. Its only species, Perzelia arda, is found in Chile. Both the genus and species were described by John Frederick Gates Clarke in 1978.

The wingspan is 15–18 mm. The forewings are sordid (dirty) white, basally with some pale ocherous suffusion and with the extreme edge of the costa, at the base, fuscous. The hindwings are pale grayish, darker toward the margins.
