= Gonada phosphorodes =

Scientific classification
- Kingdom: Animalia
- Phylum: Arthropoda
- Class: Insecta
- Order: Lepidoptera
- Family: Depressariidae
- Genus: Gonada
- Species: G. phosphorodes

Binomial name
- Gonada phosphorodes Meyrick, 1922

Species of moth

Gonada phosphorodes is a moth in the family Depressariidae. It was described by Edward Meyrick in 1922. It is found in French Guiana.

The wingspan is about 36 mm. The forewings are rosy grey, more rosy along the costa, the base of the wing rose pink, the dorsal area beneath the fold lighter and more rosy. The hindwings are pale rosy grey, with the subdorsal hairs rosy.
