= Comotechna dentifera =

Scientific classification
- Domain: Eukaryota
- Kingdom: Animalia
- Phylum: Arthropoda
- Class: Insecta
- Order: Lepidoptera
- Family: Depressariidae
- Genus: Comotechna
- Species: C. dentifera

Binomial name
- Comotechna dentifera Meyrick, 1921

Species of moth

Comotechna dentifera is a moth in the family Depressariidae. It was described by Edward Meyrick in 1921. It is found in Brazil and Peru.

The wingspan is 9–10 millimetres (0.35–0.39 in). The forewings are violet fuscous with an oblique mark from the costa at one-fourth running into a short subcostal longitudinal streak, beneath it whitish ochreous, preceded and followed by dark fuscous suffusion and with an irregular-edged curved oblique dark fuscous fasciate streak from one-fourth of the dorsum to beneath this, edged with whitish suffusion. A dark fuscous oblique fasciate mediodorsal blotch reaches three-fourths across the wing, edged whitish, the anterior edge sinuate convex, the posterior concave with a well-marked triangular projection in the middle. There is an ochreous-orange very oblique striga from the middle of the costa, preceded and followed by fine white blackish-edged strigae. There are some variable small dark fuscous spots towards the dorsum beyond this, surrounded by whitish suffusion and an indistinct irregular blue-leaden transverse line is found at three-fourths, followed by a whitish dot on the costa and there is some slight whitish-ochreous marking or suffusion in the disc beyond this. An oblique leaden line is found before the apex, then to the tornus abutting on a whitish terminal line. The hindwings are dark fuscous.
