= Chariphylla =

Scientific classification
- Kingdom: Animalia
- Phylum: Arthropoda
- Class: Insecta
- Order: Lepidoptera
- Family: Depressariidae
- Subfamily: Depressariinae
- Genus: Chariphylla; Meyrick, 1921
- Species: C. closterias

Binomial name
- Chariphylla closterias Meyrick, 1921

Genus of moths

Chariphylla is a monotypic moth genus in the family Depressariidae. Its only species, Chariphylla closterias, is found in Peru. Both the genus and species were first described by Edward Meyrick in 1921.

The wingspan is 22 mm. The forewings brown slightly rosy tinged, suffusedly sprinkled with dark fuscous with the costal edge dark fuscous towards the base and with a narrow white costal streak from one-sixth to three-fourths and a white spot on the dorsum near the base, where a sinuate white subdorsal line, furcate (forked) anteriorly and connected with both ends of it, runs to the dorsum at two-thirds. There is a curved white line from above the fold at one-third of the wing to the dorsum at four-fifths, connected on the dorsum with the preceding, some white irroration (sprinkles) between them posteriorly and with some scattered white scales towards the costa. The hindwings are light grey, sprinkled darker on the veins and terminally.
