= Costoma =

Scientific classification
- Domain: Eukaryota
- Kingdom: Animalia
- Phylum: Arthropoda
- Class: Insecta
- Order: Lepidoptera
- Family: Depressariidae
- Subfamily: Depressariinae
- Genus: Costoma; Busck, 1914

Synonyms
- Phalarotarsa Meyrick, 1924

Genus of moths

Costoma is a moth genus of the family Depressariidae.

== Species ==
- Costoma basirosella Busck, 1914
- Costoma cirrophaea (Meyrick, 1924)
