= Gonada falculinella =

Scientific classification
- Domain: Eukaryota
- Kingdom: Animalia
- Phylum: Arthropoda
- Class: Insecta
- Order: Lepidoptera
- Family: Depressariidae
- Genus: Gonada
- Species: G. falculinella

Binomial name
- Gonada falculinella Busck, 1911

Species of moth

Gonada falculinella is a moth in the family Depressariidae. It was described by August Busck in 1911. It is found in French Guiana.

The wingspan is about 23 mm. The forewings are light purplish brown with the dorsal area below the fold from the base to the apical third of the dorsum light yellow. The entire wing is sparsely and irregularly sprinkled with black atoms. The costal edge is narrowly blackish brown. The hindwings are light yellowish fuscous.
