= Psittacastis cosmodoxa =

Scientific classification
- Kingdom: Animalia
- Phylum: Arthropoda
- Clade: Pancrustacea
- Class: Insecta
- Order: Lepidoptera
- Family: Depressariidae
- Genus: Psittacastis
- Species: P. cosmodoxa

Binomial name
- Psittacastis cosmodoxa Meyrick, 1921

Species of moth

Psittacastis cosmodoxa is a moth in the family Depressariidae. It was described by Edward Meyrick in 1921. It is found in Peru.

The wingspan is about 13 mm. The forewings are leaden grey with a rather oblique violet-golden-metallic streak from the costa at one-third, edged with black on both sides, more broadly towards the costa anteriorly, almost meeting a similar erect streak from the dorsum in the middle, edged black anteriorly. Beyond these is a broad brownish-ochreous transverse band dilated towards the costa, limited posteriorly by an inwards-oblique pale yellowish black-edged mark from the costa at four-fifths and an erect violet-golden-metallic streak from the dorsum at four-fifths. A rather down-curved light blue-grey line connects the apices of the two dorsal streaks and from the apex of the yellowish mark, a violet-golden-metallic line runs to the apex of a rather oblique blue-grey fasciate streak from the middle of the costa. There is also a blue-grey line along the costa from the middle to the yellowish mark and a violet-golden-metallic terminal fascia. The apical prominence is orange. The hindwings are dark fuscous.
