= Athrinacia xanthographa =

Scientific classification
- Domain: Eukaryota
- Kingdom: Animalia
- Phylum: Arthropoda
- Class: Insecta
- Order: Lepidoptera
- Family: Depressariidae
- Genus: Athrinacia
- Species: A. xanthographa

Binomial name
- Athrinacia xanthographa Walsingham, 1911

Species of moth

Athrinacia xanthographa is a moth in the family Depressariidae. It was described by Lord Walsingham in 1911. It is found in Mexico, where it has been recorded from Guerrero.

The wingspan is 13–14 mm. The forewings are lilac grey, with pale yellow bands and spots enclosing patches of yellowish brown these are distributed as follows: a yellow patch at the base is produced along the upper edge of the cell, emitting an ocelloid patch with brown centre which reaches to the dorsum at one-fourth, a central band of yellow encloses a small triangular brown spot on the costa and a larger dorsal spot slightly beyond it, a yellow spot lying between this and a third yellow band, crossing the wing before the costal cilia and enclosing an elongate brown patch and a small costal spot. Beyond this a brown costal spot occurs at the commencement of the costal cilia and is followed by a chain-like, wavy line, of brown around the apex and termen which is inwardly margined with yellow. A small yellow patch lies across the apical veins beyond the end of the cell, sometimes enclosing brown specks. The hindwings are pale greyish.
