= Psittacastis eumolybda =

Scientific classification
- Domain: Eukaryota
- Kingdom: Animalia
- Phylum: Arthropoda
- Class: Insecta
- Order: Lepidoptera
- Family: Depressariidae
- Genus: Psittacastis
- Species: P. eumolybda

Binomial name
- Psittacastis eumolybda Meyrick, 1926

Species of moth

Psittacastis eumolybda is a moth in the family Depressariidae. It was described by Edward Meyrick in 1926. It is found in Peru.

The wingspan is about 13 mm. The forewings are brown with the basal half, except a blotch on the base of the dorsum, dark fuscous, extending on the costa to near the middle and on the dorsum to two-thirds, and confluent with a blotch in the disc beyond the middle. There are leaden-metallic markings as fellows: a narrow oblique fascia at one-fourth, an oblique fasciate streak white on the costal edge from the costa at two-fifths reaching half across the wing, a blotch narrowed downwards resting on the dorsum beyond the middle, and with an oblique branch from the anterior angle not quite reaching the dorsum, a slender oblique streak from between two white strigulae beyond the middle of the costa, an oval spot in the disc beyond the apex of this, and an oval blotch along the lower half of termen. There is a narrow fuscous streak from the posterior discal spot to the apex, and a dark fuscous one along the posterior part of the costa. The hindwings are dark fuscous, somewhat lighter anteriorly.
