= Psittacastis incisa =

Scientific classification
- Domain: Eukaryota
- Kingdom: Animalia
- Phylum: Arthropoda
- Class: Insecta
- Order: Lepidoptera
- Family: Depressariidae
- Genus: Psittacastis
- Species: P. incisa

Binomial name
- Psittacastis incisa (Walsingham, 1912)

Synonyms
- Necedes incisa Walsingham, 1912

Species of moth

Psittacastis incisa is a moth in the family Depressariidae. It was described by Lord Walsingham in 1912. It is found in Mexico (Tabasco) and Panama.

The wingspan is about 12 mm. The forewings are pale brownish ochreous, much mottled with dark brown, of which there is a spot at the base of the costa, a larger patch at the base of the dorsum, an outwardly oblique band, from the costa at one-fourth, extending a little across the middle of the fold, immediately followed by a pale, shining, steel-grey costal blotch, also reaching nearly to the fold, and extending to the middle of the wing. Beyond this are two very oblique whitish costal streaklets, outwardly dark margined, embedded in the dark brown colour which overspreads the remainder of the costal portion of the wing, with the exception of a narrow space below and adjacent to them which is pale ferruginous. A dark line from the end of the second streak, its upper edge tinged with ferruginous, runs to the apex, a whitish space below it being cut longitudinally, and narrowly margined outwardly, by lines of ferruginous scales. The termen is shining, whitish, a slender black curved line, outwardly margined with ferruginous, running through the cilia from the base of the subapical incision a black dot preceding it at about its middle. The hindwings are dark brownish grey.
