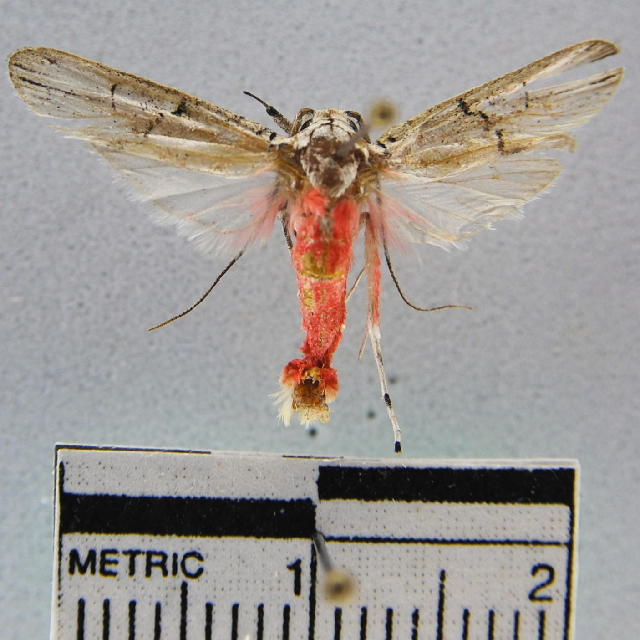

Scientific classification
- Kingdom: Animalia
- Phylum: Arthropoda
- Class: Insecta
- Order: Lepidoptera
- Family: Depressariidae
- Subfamily: Depressariinae
- Genus: Philtronoma; Meyrick, 1914
- Species: P. roseicorpus

Binomial name
- Philtronoma roseicorpus (Dognin, 1910)

Synonyms
- Oecophora roseicorpus Dognin, 1910

= Philtronoma =

Species of moth

Philtronoma roseicorpus is a moth in the family Depressariidae, and one of two species in the genus Philtronoma. It was described by Paul Dognin in 1910 and is found in Bolivia, Peru, Brazil, French Guiana, Costa Rica and Panama.
