= Hastamea =

Scientific classification
- Kingdom: Animalia
- Phylum: Arthropoda
- Clade: Pancrustacea
- Class: Insecta
- Order: Lepidoptera
- Family: Depressariidae
- Subfamily: Depressariinae
- Genus: Hastamea; Busck, 1940
- Species: H. argentidorsella

Binomial name
- Hastamea argentidorsella (Busck, 1911)

Synonyms
- Hasta Busck, 1911 (preocc. Kirkaldy, 1906); Hasta argentidorsella Busck, 1911

Species of moth

Hastamea argentidorsella is a moth in the family Depressariidae, and the only species in the genus Hastamea. It was described by August Busck in 1911 and is found in Brazil (Paraná).

The wingspan is 16–18 mm. The forewings are light yellowish brown, lightest along the costa. The dorsum, from the base nearly to the tornus, is silvery white, this colour reaching up beyond the fold in an ill-defined triangle just beyond the middle of the wing. This dorsal white is broken by a dark brown spot, reaching from the upper dark part of the wing to the dorsal edge before the middle of the wing, and by a group of deep blackish brown scales at the apical third. The hindwings are light yellowish fuscous.
