= Afdera jimenae =

Scientific classification
- Kingdom: Animalia
- Phylum: Arthropoda
- Clade: Pancrustacea
- Class: Insecta
- Order: Lepidoptera
- Family: Depressariidae
- Genus: Afdera
- Species: A. jimenae

Binomial name
- Afdera jimenae Ogden & Parra, 2001

Species of moth

Afdera jimenae is a moth in the family Depressariidae. It is found in Chile, where it was first recorded from the Península de Hualpén.

== Description ==
The wingspan is 13–16 mm for males and 15–18 mm for females. Adults are on wing from October to December in one generation per year.

== Ecology ==
The larvae feed on fallen leaves of various species of plants, including Cryptocarya alba, Aextoxicon punctatum, Peumus boldus, and Lithraea caustica.

== Etymology ==
The species name is dedicated to Jimena C. Ogden, spouse of T. Heath Ogden, one of the authors.
