= Psittacastis =

Scientific classification
- Kingdom: Animalia
- Phylum: Arthropoda
- Class: Insecta
- Order: Lepidoptera
- Family: Depressariidae
- Subfamily: Depressariinae
- Genus: Psittacastis; Meyrick, 1909

Synonyms
- Necedes Walsingham, 1912

Genus of moths

Psittacastis is a moth genus of the family Depressariidae.

== Species ==
- Psittacastis argentata Meyrick, 1921
- Psittacastis championella (Walsingham, 1912)
- Psittacastis cocae (Busck, 1931)
- Psittacastis cosmodoxa Meyrick, 1921
- Psittacastis eumolybda Meyrick, 1926
- Psittacastis eurychrysa Meyrick, 1909
- Psittacastis gaulica Meyrick, 1909
- Psittacastis incisa (Walsingham, 1912)
- Psittacastis molybdaspis Meyrick, 1926
- Psittacastis pictrix Meyrick, 1921
- Psittacastis propriella (Walker, 1864)
- Psittacastis pyrsophanes Meyrick, 1936
- Psittacastis stigmaphylli (Walsingham, 1912)
- Psittacastis superatella (Walker, 1864)
- Psittacastis trierica Meyrick, 1909
