= Filinota regifica =

Scientific classification
- Domain: Eukaryota
- Kingdom: Animalia
- Phylum: Arthropoda
- Class: Insecta
- Order: Lepidoptera
- Family: Depressariidae
- Genus: Filinota
- Species: F. regifica

Binomial name
- Filinota regifica Meyrick, 1921

Species of moth

Filinota regifica is a moth in the family Depressariidae. It was described by Edward Meyrick in 1921. It is found in Pará, Brazil.

The wingspan is about 15 mm. The forewings are whitish grey irrorated (sprinkled) with blackish and with a small yellow spot on the base of the costa, edged beneath by a black dot. Beyond this is a triangular pale yellow spot along the costa, edged with crimson. Shining yellow-whitish transverse blotches are found from the dorsum at one-fourth and before the tornus, edged with crimson, reaching halfway across the wing, the first of these followed in the disc by an oval yellow-crimson edged spot touching it. There is a triangular yellow-crimson edged blotch from the costa beyond the middle, directed towards the second dorsal blotch and there is an oval shining white crimson edged blotch in the disc posteriorly, as well as a brassy-yellow marginal streak running around the apex and termen and shortly produced inwards beneath the postdiscal blotch, interiorly crimson edged. The hindwings are yellow whitish.
