= Doina inconspicua =

Scientific classification
- Kingdom: Animalia
- Phylum: Arthropoda
- Class: Insecta
- Order: Lepidoptera
- Family: Depressariidae
- Genus: Doina
- Species: D. inconspicua

Binomial name
- Doina inconspicua J. F. G. Clarke, 1978

Species of moth

Doina inconspicua is a moth in the family Depressariidae. It was described by John Frederick Gates Clarke in 1978. It is found in Chile.

The wingspan is 26–30 mm. The forewings are light drab, irrorated (sprinkled) with scattered greyish-fuscous scales. At two-fifths, in the cell, is an ill-defined, small fuscous discal spot and there is a similar but larger spot at the end of the cell, while a third similar spot is found on the fold. Between the end of the cell and the termen is a series of three or four small, ill-defined fuscous spots. Along the termen, to the tornus, is a series of seven ill-defined fuscous spots. The hindwings are sordid (dirty) white, the surface towards the margins irrorated with fuscous scales.
