= Athrinacia cosmophragma =

Scientific classification
- Domain: Eukaryota
- Kingdom: Animalia
- Phylum: Arthropoda
- Class: Insecta
- Order: Lepidoptera
- Family: Depressariidae
- Genus: Athrinacia
- Species: A. cosmophragma

Binomial name
- Athrinacia cosmophragma Meyrick, 1922

Species of moth

Athrinacia cosmophragma is a moth in the family Depressariidae. It was described by Edward Meyrick in 1922. It is found in Brazil.

The wingspan is 9–10 mm. The forewings are lilac grey with the markings strongly outlined pale yellow edged blackish, and filled in with ground colour speckled blackish. There is a slightly curved elongate-oval blotch extending from the base just beneath the costa to one-third of the dorsum. There is a transverse fasciae slightly before the middle and at two-thirds (yellow-margined all round). There is also a narrow pale yellowish fascia, inwards-angulated in the middle, from the costa towards the apex to the tornus with some blackish marginal marks around the apex and termen surrounded with pale yellowish. The hindwings are grey.
