= Filinota ithymetra =

Scientific classification
- Kingdom: Animalia
- Phylum: Arthropoda
- Class: Insecta
- Order: Lepidoptera
- Family: Depressariidae
- Genus: Filinota
- Species: F. ithymetra

Binomial name
- Filinota ithymetra Meyrick, 1926

Species of moth

Filinota ithymetra is a moth in the family Depressariidae. It was described by Edward Meyrick in 1926. It is found in Colombia.

The wingspan is about 19 mm. The forewings are yellow, the basal third coarsely reticulated with red, the rest streaked with red between the veins. There is a black subbasal dot in the middle and fuscous markings edged with red as follows: a small spot on the costa at one-fifth, a streak along the dorsum from the base to one-third, then stronger across the wing to a flattened-triangular blotch on the middle of the costa, and again slenderer to the tornus, from beyond the cell sending a straight branch to the costa at three-fourths, a small spot is also on the lower angle of the cell. There are semioval blackish marginal dots around the apex and termen. The hindwings are ochreous whitish.
