= Nedenia =

Scientific classification
- Kingdom: Animalia
- Phylum: Arthropoda
- Class: Insecta
- Order: Lepidoptera
- Family: Depressariidae
- Subfamily: Depressariinae
- Genus: Nedenia; J. F. G. Clarke, 1978
- Species: N. rhodochra

Binomial name
- Nedenia rhodochra J. F. G. Clarke, 1978

Species of moth

Nedenia is a monotypic moth genus in the family Depressariidae. Its only species, Nedenia rhodochra, is found in Chile. Both the genus and species were described by John Frederick Gates Clarke in 1978.

The wingspan is 18–22 mm. The forewings are buff with the extreme edge of the costa narrowly coral red and yellow. There is a small, outwardly oblique blackish dash at the extreme base of the costa and at the basal third are scattered blackish scales which form an ill-defined blackish dash. A conspicuous triangular vinaceous-brown spot with its base on the costa is found at the apical two-thirds. In the cell and on the fold are some scattered blackish scales, while there is a vinaceous-brown suffusion on the dorsum. In females, the extreme dorsal edge is blackish fuscous. The hindwings are whitish to pale buff.
