= Doina (moth) =

Scientific classification
- Domain: Eukaryota
- Kingdom: Animalia
- Phylum: Arthropoda
- Class: Insecta
- Order: Lepidoptera
- Family: Depressariidae
- Subfamily: Depressariinae
- Genus: Doina; Clarke, 1978

Genus of moths

Doina is a moth genus of the family Depressariidae.

== Species ==
- Doina annulata Clarke, 1978
- Doina asperula Clarke, 1978
- Doina clarkei Parra & Ibarra-Vidal, 1991
- Doina edmondsii (Butler, 1883)
- Doina eremnogramma Clarke, 1978
- Doina flinti Clarke, 1978
- Doina glebula Clarke, 1978
- Doina inconspicua Clarke, 1978
- Doina increta (Butler, 1883)
- Doina lagneia Clarke, 1978
- Doina paralagneia Clarke, 1978
- Doina phaeobregma Clarke, 1978
- Doina scariphista (Meyrick, 1931)
- Doina subicula Clarke, 1978
- Doina trachycantha Clarke, 1978
- Doina truncata Clarke, 1978
