= Fuchsia (moth) =

Scientific classification
- Kingdom: Animalia
- Phylum: Arthropoda
- Clade: Pancrustacea
- Class: Insecta
- Order: Lepidoptera
- Family: Depressariidae
- Subfamily: Depressariinae
- Tribe: Fuchsiini
- Genus: Fuchsia; Spuler, 1910

Type species
- Oecophora luteella Heinemann, 1870

Species
- See text

Synonyms
- Lesiandra Meyrick, 1914

Genus of moths

Fuchsia is a genus of gelechioid moths and only genus of the Fuchsiini tribe. In some systematic layouts, it is placed in the subfamily Amphisbatinae of the concealer moth family (Oecophoridae).

== Species ==
Species of Fuchsia include:

- Fuchsia huertasi Vives, 1995
- Fuchsia luteella (Heinemann, 1870)
