= Doina asperula =

Scientific classification
- Kingdom: Animalia
- Phylum: Arthropoda
- Class: Insecta
- Order: Lepidoptera
- Family: Depressariidae
- Genus: Doina
- Species: D. asperula

Binomial name
- Doina asperula J. F. G. Clarke, 1978

Species of moth

Doina asperula is a moth in the family Depressariidae. It was described by John Frederick Gates Clarke in 1978. It is found in Chile.

The wingspan is 23–24 mm. The forewings are light cinnamon buff with a narrow white patch edged outwardly by fuscous at the base. From slightly beyond the middle of the costa, a broad, transverse grey shade extends to the dorsum and curves inwardly to the basal white patch. The outer edge of the grey shade is marked by an outwardly curved line of black spots. The costa, beyond the beginning of the grey shade and termen, is greyish fuscous. The hindwings are very pale greyish basally, lightly infuscated toward the margin, the margin narrowly greyish fuscous.
