= Comotechna scutulata =

Scientific classification
- Domain: Eukaryota
- Kingdom: Animalia
- Phylum: Arthropoda
- Class: Insecta
- Order: Lepidoptera
- Family: Depressariidae
- Genus: Comotechna
- Species: C. scutulata

Binomial name
- Comotechna scutulata Meyrick, 1921

Species of moth

Comotechna scutulata is a moth in the family Depressariidae. It was described by Edward Meyrick in 1921. It is found in Brazil.

The wingspan is about 10 mm. The forewings are rather dark fuscous with a rather broad ochreous-whitish streak along the costa from the base, marked with very oblique cloudy dark fuscous strigulae from the costa near the base and at one-fourth, and terminated by a very oblique orange-yellow blackish-edged striga from the costa before the middle, followed by a white posteriorly black-edged strigula and a large medio-dorsal rather oblique transverse dark fuscous blotch edged with whitish, reaching three-fourths across the wing, the anterior edge strongly convex, the posterior almost straight, the apex shortly projecting posteriorly, a transverse fasciate streak of dark fuscous suffusion edged on each side with grey-whitish suffusion midway between this and the base. There is an irregular transverse leaden line at three-fourths, preceded on the dorsal half by an 8-shaped darker blotch edged with ochreous whitish, on the costa followed by an ochreous-whitish dot. There are some slight marks of ochreous-whitish suffusion in the disc beyond this, as well as an oblique leaden line before the apex from an ochreous-whitish spot in the costal cilia, then to the tornus abutting on an ochreous-whitish terminal line. The hindwings are dark fuscous.
