= Deloryctis =

Scientific classification
- Kingdom: Animalia
- Phylum: Arthropoda
- Class: Insecta
- Order: Lepidoptera
- Family: Depressariidae
- Subfamily: Depressariinae
- Genus: Deloryctis; Meyrick, 1934
- Species: D. corticivora

Binomial name
- Deloryctis corticivora Meyrick, 1934

Genus of moths

Deloryctis is a monotypic moth genus in the family Depressariidae. Its only species, Deloryctis corticivora, is found on Java in Indonesia. Both the genus and species were first described by Edward Meyrick in 1934.
