= Profilinota =

Scientific classification
- Kingdom: Animalia
- Phylum: Arthropoda
- Class: Insecta
- Order: Lepidoptera
- Family: Depressariidae
- Subfamily: Depressariinae
- Genus: Profilinota; Clarke, 1973
- Species: P. notaula

Binomial name
- Profilinota notaula (Meyrick, 1933)

Synonyms
- Ilarches Meyrick, 1933 (preocc. Cantor, 1850); Ilarches notaula Meyrick, 1933; Profilinota phillita Clarke, 1973

Genus of moths

Profilinota is a monotypic moth genus in the family Depressariidae erected by John Frederick Gates Clarke in 1973. Its only species, Profilinota notaula, was first described by Edward Meyrick in 1933. It is found in Bolivia and Venezuela.
