= Psittacastis pictrix =

Scientific classification
- Domain: Eukaryota
- Kingdom: Animalia
- Phylum: Arthropoda
- Class: Insecta
- Order: Lepidoptera
- Family: Depressariidae
- Genus: Psittacastis
- Species: P. pictrix

Binomial name
- Psittacastis pictrix Meyrick, 1921

Species of moth

Psittacastis pictrix is a moth in the family Depressariidae. It was described by Edward Meyrick in 1921. It is found in Colombia.

The wingspan is 13–15 mm. The forewings are ferruginous with a very oblique wedge-shaped yellow-whitish patch from near the base of the costa to the fold, sometimes suffused with ground colour beneath. A thick dark red-brown longitudinal streak is found from the base of the dorsum to one-third, surrounded with violet iridescence, followed by a subdorsal spot of leaden suffusion. There is a violet-silvery white oblique trapezoidal patch resting on the middle of the costa, one angle reaching three-fourths across the wing, the other forming a short acute projection posteriorly near the costa. Beyond this, a yellow-ochreous spot edged white on the costa and cut by a very oblique fine spatulate violet-metallic striga crosses half the wing and there is a streak of whitish suffusion running from the apex of the silvery costal patch to the tornus. An elongate dark fuscous spot is found on the dorsum beyond the middle, preceded and followed by spots of leaden suffusion and surrounded with violet iridescence. Three or four short black lines are located on the veins posteriorly, and a short white streak is found beneath the middle. A spot of bluish-silvery suffusion is found on the tornus and there is a small spot of blackish suffusion towards the apex, as well as a fine blackish line around the tornus. The hindwings are grey, on the basal half whitish grey.
