= Ancipita =

Scientific classification
- Kingdom: Animalia
- Phylum: Arthropoda
- Class: Insecta
- Order: Lepidoptera
- Family: Depressariidae
- Subfamily: Depressariinae
- Genus: Ancipita; Busck, 1914
- Species: A. atteria

Binomial name
- Ancipita atteria Busck, 1914

Species of moth

Ancipita atteria is a moth in the family Depressariidae, and the only species in the genus Ancipita. It was described by August Busck in 1914 and is found in Panama.

The wingspan is about 17 mm. The forewings are brick red, with golden yellow costal and dorsal edges and with three broad, longitudinal, black streaks from near the base to just before the apical edge of the wing. These black bands are interrupted beyond the middle of the wing by a narrow, brick-red crossline, connecting the two edges of the wing. The hindwings are brick red with the apical third black.
