= Doina edmondsii =

Scientific classification
- Kingdom: Animalia
- Phylum: Arthropoda
- Class: Insecta
- Order: Lepidoptera
- Family: Depressariidae
- Genus: Doina
- Species: D. edmondsii

Binomial name
- Doina edmondsii (Butler, 1883)

Synonyms
- Depressaria edmondsii Butler, 1883

Species of moth

Doina edmondsii is a moth in the family Depressariidae. It was described by Arthur Gardiner Butler in 1883. It is found in Chile.

The wingspan is about 19 mm. The wings are shining grey, darker towards the external area. The forewings are tinted with pink, the base black brown, with purplish reflections and a very irregular transverse brown band just before the middle. The costal border, from the commencement of this band to the apex, is spotted with blackish and there is an arched dusky submarginal band and a marginal series of black dots. The hindwings are somewhat silvery, with a slender blackish marginal line.
