= Comotechna parmifera =

Scientific classification
- Domain: Eukaryota
- Kingdom: Animalia
- Phylum: Arthropoda
- Class: Insecta
- Order: Lepidoptera
- Family: Depressariidae
- Genus: Comotechna
- Species: C. parmifera

Binomial name
- Comotechna parmifera Meyrick, 1921

Species of moth

Comotechna parmifera is a moth in the family Depressariidae. It was described by Edward Meyrick in 1921. It is found in Peru and Pará, Brazil.

The wingspan is about 12 mm. The forewings are rather dark fuscous with a rather broad ochreous-whitish streak along the costa from the base, marked with very oblique cloudy dark fuscous strigulae from the costa near the base and at one-fourth, and terminated by a very oblique orange-yellow blackish-edged striga from the costa before the middle, followed by a white posteriorly black-edged strigula. There is a large mediodorsal rather oblique transverse dark fuscous blotch edged whitish, reaching three-fourths across the wing, the anterior edge strongly convex, the posterior almost straight, the apex shortly projecting posteriorly, a transverse blotch of dark fuscous suffusion edged whitish anteriorly immediately precedes this. There is also a small leaden-metallic subdorsal spot near beyond this and an indistinct transverse leaden-metallic line at three-fourths, preceded below the middle by an incomplete ochreous-whitish ring, within which is a small suffused ochreous-whitish spot and there is a small ochreous-whitish mark on the costa just beyond this, as well as a roundish patch of ochreous-whitish suffusion occupying the disc beyond this, followed by a rather excurved bluish-leaden line from four-fifths of the costa to the tornus, abutting beneath on an ochreous-whitish terminal line. The hindwings are dark fuscous.
