= Lepidozancla =

Scientific classification
- Kingdom: Animalia
- Phylum: Arthropoda
- Clade: Pancrustacea
- Class: Insecta
- Order: Lepidoptera
- Family: Depressariidae
- Subfamily: Depressariinae
- Genus: Lepidozancla; Turner, 1896
- Species: L. zatrephes

Binomial name
- Lepidozancla zatrephes (Turner, 1916)

Synonyms
- Machimia zatrephes Turner, 1916

Genus of moths

Lepidozancla is a genus of moths of the family Depressariidae. It contains only one species, Lepidozancla zatrephes, which was described by Alfred Jefferis Turner in 1916 and is found in Australia, where it has been recorded from Queensland.

The wingspan is 18–22 mm. The forewings are ochreous-grey-whitish with a fuscous discal dot at one-third, and a second considerably before it on the fold, both of which may be obsolete, and a third in the disc beyond the middle. Sometimes, there are a few fuscous scales in a median line before and after the third dot. The hindwings are grey-whitish.
