= Palinorsa zonaria =

Scientific classification
- Domain: Eukaryota
- Kingdom: Animalia
- Phylum: Arthropoda
- Class: Insecta
- Order: Lepidoptera
- Family: Depressariidae
- Genus: Palinorsa
- Species: P. zonaria

Binomial name
- Palinorsa zonaria Clarke, 1964

Species of moth

Palinorsa zonaria is a moth in the family Depressariidae. It was described by Clarke in 1964. It is found in Bolivia.

The wingspan is about 42 mm. The forewings are pale orange yellow with a brown median longitudinal streak and the costa very narrowly edged with white. There is a pale spot on each side of vein Ic opposite the base of vein 2. The hindwings are semi-hyaline with the costal third ocherous white.
