= Comotechna semiberbis =

Scientific classification
- Domain: Eukaryota
- Kingdom: Animalia
- Phylum: Arthropoda
- Class: Insecta
- Order: Lepidoptera
- Family: Depressariidae
- Genus: Comotechna
- Species: C. semiberbis

Binomial name
- Comotechna semiberbis Meyrick, 1921

Species of moth

Comotechna semiberbis is a moth in the family Depressariidae. It was described by Edward Meyrick in 1921. It is found in Peru.

The wingspan is 13–14 mm. The forewings are dark grey with a fine whitish median longitudinal line from the base to the mediodorsal blotch, sometimes merged in a general obscure whitish suffusion of this area, sometimes a yellow or whitish streak beneath the costa towards the base, and a faint violet streak beneath this. There is an oblique dark-edged yellow-ochreous striga from the middle of the costa, and a fine violet striga, white on the costa, on each side of it. A dark fuscous fasciate curved oblique mediodorsal blotch reaches three-fourths across the wing, parallel sided, edged with whitish ochreous, the apex pointed posteriorly. There is another incurved whitish-ochreous streak beyond the upper portion of this, and some leaden iridescence towards the dorsum and an irregular obscure leaden transverse line is found at three-fourths, edged with whitish ochreous towards the costa and crossed by an oblique whitish-ochreous mark in the disc. There is a patch of ochreous-whitish irroration (sprinkles) in the disc beyond this and a curved violet-leaden transverse line crossing obliquely before the apex and abutting beneath on an ochreous-whitish terminal line. The hindwings are dark fuscous.
