= Trycherodes chilibrella =

Scientific classification
- Domain: Eukaryota
- Kingdom: Animalia
- Phylum: Arthropoda
- Class: Insecta
- Order: Lepidoptera
- Family: Depressariidae
- Genus: Trycherodes
- Species: T. chilibrella

Binomial name
- Trycherodes chilibrella (Busck, 1914)

Synonyms
- Teratomorpha chilibrella Busck, 1914

Species of moth

Trycherodes chilibrella is a moth in the family Depressariidae. It was described by August Busck in 1914. It is found in Panama.

The wingspan is about 20 mm. The forewings are whitish ochreous, slightly and irregularly overlaid with single, dark-brown scales and with the costal edge and the veins somewhat deeper ochreous. The brown scales form two faint and ill-defined, outwardly curved lines across the wing, one submarginal and one parallel therewith on the middle of the veins. There is also an irregular aggregation of dark scales on the middle of the cell, tending downward to the dorsal edge. On the middle of the costa is a small group of dark-brown scales and at the end of the cell is a similar dark-brown spot. The hindwings are ochreous white, brownish below the costal excavation, with a faint brown submarginal shade and a thin brown line at the base of the cilia.
