= Talitha kum =

Talitha kum, Talitha kumi, or Talitha cumi may refer to:

- A phrase in the story of the raising of Jairus' daughter; see Language of Jesus § Talitha kum (Ταλιθὰ κούμ)
- Talitha Kum, a Catholic organization
- Talitha Koumi Church in Bangladesh; see Christianity in Bangladesh
- Talitha Kumi School in Beit Jala, West Bank, State of Palestine
- "Talitha Cumi" (The X-Files), an episode of The X-Files
- Talitha Qumi, a Romanian progressive rock band

== See also ==
- Talitha (disambiguation)
- Talitha Cummins (born 1980), Australian journalist
