= Psittacastis gaulica =

Scientific classification
- Domain: Eukaryota
- Kingdom: Animalia
- Phylum: Arthropoda
- Class: Insecta
- Order: Lepidoptera
- Family: Depressariidae
- Genus: Psittacastis
- Species: P. gaulica

Binomial name
- Psittacastis gaulica Meyrick, 1909

Species of moth

Psittacastis gaulica is a moth in the family Depressariidae. It was described by Edward Meyrick in 1909. It is found in Bolivia.

The wingspan is 17–18 mm. The forewings are bronzy-ochreous brown, mostly concealed by mixed white and dark fuscous suffusion, indicating various irregular but very undefined markings. There is a white trapezoidal blotch on the costa before the middle, the outer edge very oblique, margined by a leaden-metallic streak. Beyond this are two very oblique parallel streaks from the costa, separated from it and from each other by fulvous interspaces, the first violet-leaden metallic, white on the costa, black-edged posteriorly, dilated downwards, terminating in an elongate-oval violet-leaden-metallic spot in the disc, the second white, terminating in the same spot. There is an inwardly oblique white strigula from the costa midway between this and the apex and a thick excurved pale bronzy-metallic transverse streak close before the lower part of the termen, its upper end preceded by a triangular blackish spot, the terminal area beyond this white containing a black mark at the base of the indentation and another between this and the apex of the tornal prominence, the terminal edge dark fuscous with a short projection between these two black marks. The hindwings are grey.
