= Athrinacia trifasciata =

Scientific classification
- Domain: Eukaryota
- Kingdom: Animalia
- Phylum: Arthropoda
- Class: Insecta
- Order: Lepidoptera
- Family: Depressariidae
- Genus: Athrinacia
- Species: A. trifasciata

Binomial name
- Athrinacia trifasciata Walsingham, 1911

Species of moth

Athrinacia trifasciata is a moth in the family Depressariidae. It was described by Lord Walsingham in 1911. It is found in Mexico, where it has been recorded from Guerrero.

The wingspan is about 13 mm. The forewings are bright straw yellow, with three lilac-grey transverse fasciae, each narrowly margined by a darker line. The first, leaving the costa at one-third from the base, is obliquely attenuated downward reverting to the dorsum from the fold and the second, rather wider at about the middle, is outwardly sinuate on the cell. The third, at the commencement of the costal cilia, is moderately straight, but broken and diffused on its outer edge toward the termen, which is marked by a narrow toothed line of pale tawny brown running around the apex. Along the base of the dorsum is a narrow, elongate, lilac-grey streak and between the first and second fasciae is a tawny brown dorsal spot, another lying beyond the end of the cell between the second and third fasciae. The hindwings are pale grey.
