= Bleptochiton =

Scientific classification
- Kingdom: Animalia
- Phylum: Arthropoda
- Class: Insecta
- Order: Lepidoptera
- Family: Depressariidae
- Subfamily: Depressariinae
- Genus: Bleptochiton; Turner, 1947
- Species: B. leucotrigona

Binomial name
- Bleptochiton leucotrigona Turner, 1947

Species of moth

Bleptochiton leucotrigona is a moth in the family Depressariidae, and the only species in the genus Bleptochiton. It was described by Alfred Jefferis Turner in 1947. It is found in Australia, where it has been recorded from Queensland.

The wingspan is 24–26 mm.
