= Palinorsa literatella =

Scientific classification
- Domain: Eukaryota
- Kingdom: Animalia
- Phylum: Arthropoda
- Class: Insecta
- Order: Lepidoptera
- Family: Depressariidae
- Genus: Palinorsa
- Species: P. literatella

Binomial name
- Palinorsa literatella (Busck, 1911)

Synonyms
- Pleurota literatella Busck, 1911

Species of moth

Palinorsa literatella is a moth in the family Depressariidae. It was described by August Busck in 1911. It is found in French Guiana.

The wingspan is 32–38 mm. The forewings are light brown and the dorsal half is somewhat lighter and more yellowish than the costal half and separated from it by an indistinct longitudinal streak of darker brown. At the end of the cell is a faint blackish shade, hardly discernible as two small black dots and on the middle of the wing are two small, well-defined ocher-yellow dots, edged with reddish scales, one on each side of vein lb. The extreme dorsal edge is ocherous towards the base. The hindwings are yellowish white.
