= Filinota ignita =

Scientific classification
- Domain: Eukaryota
- Kingdom: Animalia
- Phylum: Arthropoda
- Class: Insecta
- Order: Lepidoptera
- Family: Depressariidae
- Genus: Filinota
- Species: F. ignita

Binomial name
- Filinota ignita (Busck, 1912)

Synonyms
- Lupercalia ignita Busck, 1912

Species of moth

Filinota ignita is a moth in the family Depressariidae. It was described by August Busck in 1912. It is found in Panama.

The wingspan is about 16 mm. The forewings are greyish white with a broad bright golden yellow costal edge reaching around the apex and lined with carmine and black scales. There are three conspicuous transverse silvery white blotches, one obliquely placed at base, edged with black, another perpendicular on the dorsal edge just beyond the middle of the wing, edged with black and carmine, and a third and largest adjoining the golden apical area. This also is black lined. The hindwings are silvery white.
