= Afdera orphnaea =

Scientific classification
- Kingdom: Animalia
- Phylum: Arthropoda
- Clade: Pancrustacea
- Class: Insecta
- Order: Lepidoptera
- Family: Depressariidae
- Genus: Afdera
- Species: A. orphnaea

Binomial name
- Afdera orphnaea (Meyrick, 1931)

Synonyms
- Cryptolechia orphnaea Meyrick, 1931

Species of moth

Afdera orphnaea is a moth in the family Depressariidae. It was described by Edward Meyrick in 1931. It is found in Argentina and Chile.
