= Doina annulata =

Scientific classification
- Kingdom: Animalia
- Phylum: Arthropoda
- Class: Insecta
- Order: Lepidoptera
- Family: Depressariidae
- Genus: Doina
- Species: D. annulata

Binomial name
- Doina annulata J. F. G. Clarke, 1978

Species of moth

Doina annulata is a moth in the family Depressariidae. It was described by John Frederick Gates Clarke in 1978. It is found in Chile.

The wingspan is about 24 mm. The forewings are light clay color. There is a short black, transverse dash from the extreme base of the costa to the fold and from the fold to the costa, the basal two-thirds of the wing are marked with fuscous and black scales, especially along the fold and between the end of the cell and the costa. In the middle of the cell is a black dash followed at the end of the cell by a similarly colored L-shaped mark and before the termen are three ill-defined fuscous blotches. Around the apex, along the termen to the tornus, is a series of fuscous dashes forming almost a continuous narrow line. The hindwings are olive buff with a narrow grayish-fuscous terminal line.
