= Doina trachycantha =

Scientific classification
- Kingdom: Animalia
- Phylum: Arthropoda
- Class: Insecta
- Order: Lepidoptera
- Family: Depressariidae
- Genus: Doina
- Species: D. trachycantha

Binomial name
- Doina trachycantha J. F. G. Clarke, 1978

Species of moth

Doina trachycantha is a moth in the family Depressariidae. It was described by John Frederick Gates Clarke in 1978. It is found in Chile.

The wingspan is about 26 mm. The forewings are buff with tawny suffusion along the costa. The surface of the wing is sprinkled with tawny irrorations (sprinkles) and in the middle of the cell is a slender fuscous streak. A small fuscous spot followed by tawny is found at the end of the cell and from just before the apex, on the costa, around the tornus, is a series of small fuscous spots between the veins. The hindwings are very pale cinereous with slight greyish suffusion.
