= Doina flinti =

Scientific classification
- Kingdom: Animalia
- Phylum: Arthropoda
- Class: Insecta
- Order: Lepidoptera
- Family: Depressariidae
- Genus: Doina
- Species: D. flinti

Binomial name
- Doina flinti J. F. G. Clarke, 1978

Species of moth

Doina flinti is a moth in the family Depressariidae. It was described by John Frederick Gates Clarke in 1978. It is found in Chile.

The wingspan is about 24 mm. The forewings are light buff, with the extreme costal edge white, and with inwardly, narrowly clay color. There is a clay color blotch from the middle of the costa, around the outer end of the cell to the fold. From the basal third of the costa, an ill-defined clay color fascia extends to the dorsum and in the middle of the cell, a fuscous speck is found. There is a well-defined fuscous spot at the end of the cell. The hindwings are whitish with slight buff shading terminally.
