= Filinota hermosella =

Scientific classification
- Domain: Eukaryota
- Kingdom: Animalia
- Phylum: Arthropoda
- Class: Insecta
- Order: Lepidoptera
- Family: Depressariidae
- Genus: Filinota
- Species: F. hermosella

Binomial name
- Filinota hermosella Busck, 1911

Species of moth

Filinota hermosella is a moth in the family Depressariidae. It was described by August Busck in 1911. It is found in French Guiana.

The wingspan is 15–17 mm. The forewings are bright carmine with golden yellow, blackish brown, and silvery white ornamentation. The costal edge from near the base to the apex and the terminal edge golden. On the dorsal edge are two silvery white spots, one at the basal fourth continued up into a whitish-yellow spot on the cell, the other triangular at the apical third. Three small golden yellow dashes are found on the basal half of the wing, one at the base, one just within the dorsal margin beyond the first silvery spot, and one following the continuation of that spot on the middle of the cell. On the middle of the apical part of the wing is a large conspicuous silvery white dash surrounded first by carmine, then by blackish brown scales, which latter are continued into long winding lines in the central part of the carmine, between the various white and golden spots. The hindwings are paler carmine.
