= Comotechna corculata =

Scientific classification
- Domain: Eukaryota
- Kingdom: Animalia
- Phylum: Arthropoda
- Class: Insecta
- Order: Lepidoptera
- Family: Depressariidae
- Genus: Comotechna
- Species: C. corculata

Binomial name
- Comotechna corculata Meyrick, 1921

Species of moth

Comotechna corculata is a moth in the family Depressariidae. It was described by Edward Meyrick in 1921. It is found in Peru and Pará, Brazil.

The wingspan is 9–10 mm. The forewings are fuscous with the basal third of the costa dark fuscous, cut by an oblique whitish mark at one-fourth, beneath this a yellow-ochreous streak. There is an obliquely curved suffused dark fuscous fasciate streak from one-fourth of the dorsum to this, enclosed by two whitish-ochreous streaks and with an oblique-oval medio-dorsal blotch reaching three-fourths across the wing, formed of yellow-ochreous suffusion edged with dark fuscous suffusion and then with whitish. Beyond this is a parallel whitish streak, confluent with an ochreous-whitish ring surrounding an elongate ochreous-whitish mark and a very oblique orange-ochreous striga from the costa in the middle, preceded and followed by fine white strigae edged dark fuscous. Beyond this is a whitish-ochreous elongate mark and there is a transverse silvery line at three-fourths, followed by an ochreous-whitish costal dot, as well as an oblique whitish-ochreous streak hooked beneath from the lower part of this to a silvery oblique streak crossing the wing near the apex, above this some whitish-ochreous scattered scales. There is a whitish-ochreous terminal line. The hindwings are dark grey.
