= Gonada pyronota =

Scientific classification
- Kingdom: Animalia
- Phylum: Arthropoda
- Class: Insecta
- Order: Lepidoptera
- Family: Depressariidae
- Genus: Gonada
- Species: G. pyronota

Binomial name
- Gonada pyronota Meyrick, 1924

Species of moth

Gonada pyronota is a moth in the family Depressariidae. It was described by Edward Meyrick in 1924. It is found in Peru.

The wingspan is about 28 mm. The forewings are rosy brown, with the dorsal area suffused with bright rosy ochreous anteriorly except near the base. The stigmata are indistinct, cloudy and fuscous, the plical obliquely beyond the first discal. The hindwings are pale yellow greyish, greyer posteriorly, suffused with light ochreous yellowish towards the dorsum.
