= Pisinidea exsuperans =

Scientific classification
- Domain: Eukaryota
- Kingdom: Animalia
- Phylum: Arthropoda
- Class: Insecta
- Order: Lepidoptera
- Family: Depressariidae
- Genus: Pisinidea
- Species: P. exsuperans

Binomial name
- Pisinidea exsuperans (Meyrick, 1920)

Synonyms
- Pisidinea exsuperans Meyrick, 1920

Species of moth

Pisinidea exsuperans is a moth in the family Depressariidae. It was described by Edward Meyrick in 1920. It is found in South Africa.

The wingspan is about 18 mm. The forewings are fuscous, finely and suffusedly irrorated (sprinkled) with whitish, with a few scattered dark fuscous scales and an obscure streak of pale ochreous suffusion along the fold. There is a small dark fuscous spot beneath the costa near the base, and two others representing the discal stigmata, these three connected by white suffusion. There is also a series of dark fuscous linear dots around the posterior part of the costa and termen. The hindwings are grey.
