= Trycherodes albifrons =

Scientific classification
- Kingdom: Animalia
- Phylum: Arthropoda
- Clade: Pancrustacea
- Class: Insecta
- Order: Lepidoptera
- Family: Depressariidae
- Genus: Trycherodes
- Species: T. albifrons

Binomial name
- Trycherodes albifrons (Walsingham, 1912)

Synonyms
- Teratomorpha albifrons Walsingham, 1912

Species of moth

Trycherodes albifrons is a moth in the family Depressariidae. It was described by Lord Walsingham in 1912. It is found in Mexico, Guatemala and Panama.

The wingspan is 15–20 mm. The forewings are reddish fawn-grey, sparsely sprinkled with tawny fuscous scales on the outer third, tending to run parallel with the termen. With two tawny fuscous dots, one on the middle of the cell, the other at its outer extremity. There is a small group of raised tawny fuscous scales before the middle of the costa and two on the fold, one before, and one beyond its middle, with a small patch of slightly raised scales on the flexus. The hindwings are reddish grey, darker at the apex.
