= Pisinidea =

Scientific classification
- Domain: Eukaryota
- Kingdom: Animalia
- Phylum: Arthropoda
- Class: Insecta
- Order: Lepidoptera
- Family: Depressariidae
- Subfamily: Depressariinae
- Genus: Pisinidea; Butler, 1883

Genus of moths

Pisinidea is a moth genus of the family Depressariidae.

== Species ==
- Pisinidea viridis Butler, 1883
- Pisinidea exsuperans (Meyrick, 1920)
