= Mimozela =

Scientific classification
- Kingdom: Animalia
- Phylum: Arthropoda
- Class: Insecta
- Order: Lepidoptera
- Family: Depressariidae
- Subfamily: Depressariinae
- Genus: Mimozela; Meyrick, 1914
- Species: M. rhoditis

Binomial name
- Mimozela rhoditis Meyrick, 1914

Synonyms
- Cryptolechia inquinata Turner, 1947

Genus of moths

Mimozela is a monotypic moth genus in the family Depressariidae. Its only species, Mimozela rhoditis, is found in Australia, where it has been recorded from Queensland. Both the genus and species were first described by Edward Meyrick in 1914.

The wingspan is 14–19 mm. The forewings are ochreous brown with spots of blackish suffusion on the costa near the base and at one-fourth, the latter followed by a white patch suffused with rosy, from which a streak runs to the termen beneath the apex. There is a slender rosy-white streak from the costa at two-thirds running into the apex of this. The stigmata are dark ferruginous brown, the plical beneath the first discal, the second discal transverse, edged with rosy white. The basal and discal areas are irregularly suffused and marked with white and pale rosy, and sprinkled with blackish and the veins between the cell and termen are more or less streaked with pale rosy, the interspaces marked towards the termen with a series of suffused blackish-grey marks irregularly surrounded with white. The hindwings are dark grey.
