= Athrinacia =

Scientific classification
- Domain: Eukaryota
- Kingdom: Animalia
- Phylum: Arthropoda
- Class: Insecta
- Order: Lepidoptera
- Family: Depressariidae
- Subfamily: Depressariinae
- Genus: Athrinacia; Walsingham, 1911

Genus of moths

Athrinacia is a moth genus of the family Depressariidae.

== Species ==
- Athrinacia cosmophragma Meyrick, 1922
- Athrinacia leucographa Walsingham, 1911
- Athrinacia psephophragma Meyrick, 1929
- Athrinacia trifasciata Walsingham, 1911
- Athrinacia xanthographa Walsingham, 1911
