= Gonada flavidorsis =

Scientific classification
- Kingdom: Animalia
- Phylum: Arthropoda
- Class: Insecta
- Order: Lepidoptera
- Family: Depressariidae
- Genus: Gonada
- Species: G. flavidorsis

Binomial name
- Gonada flavidorsis Meyrick, 1930

Species of moth

Gonada flavidorsis is a moth in the family Depressariidae. It was described by Edward Meyrick in 1930. It is found in Rio de Janeiro, Brazil.

The wingspan is about 26 mm.
