= Doina glebula =

Scientific classification
- Kingdom: Animalia
- Phylum: Arthropoda
- Class: Insecta
- Order: Lepidoptera
- Family: Depressariidae
- Genus: Doina
- Species: D. glebula

Binomial name
- Doina glebula J. F. G. Clarke, 1978

Species of moth

Doina glebula is a moth in the family Depressariidae. It was described by John Frederick Gates Clarke in 1978. It is found in Chile.

The wingspan is about 20 mm. The forewings are drab, the costa marked with a series of short fuscous dashes and spots. Two of the costal spots are longer than the remainder and are conspicuous at the apical third, while at the basal third, in the cell, is a transverse fuscous dash and at the end of the cell an oblique transverse fuscous dash is followed by a patch of brownish scales and between this and the costa a greyish-fuscous suffusion forms an indistinct blotch. The surface of the wing is scattered with fuscous irrorations. The hindwings are pale greyish fuscous.
