= Doina scariphista =

Scientific classification
- Kingdom: Animalia
- Phylum: Arthropoda
- Class: Insecta
- Order: Lepidoptera
- Family: Depressariidae
- Genus: Doina
- Species: D. scariphista

Binomial name
- Doina scariphista (Meyrick, 1931)

Synonyms
- Cryptolechia scariphista Meyrick, 1931

Species of moth

Doina scariphista is a moth in the family Depressariidae. It was described by Edward Meyrick in 1931. It is found in Chile.
