= Pseudocentris =

Scientific classification
- Kingdom: Animalia
- Phylum: Arthropoda
- Class: Insecta
- Order: Lepidoptera
- Family: Depressariidae
- Subfamily: Depressariinae
- Genus: Pseudocentris; Meyrick, 1921
- Species: P. testudinea

Binomial name
- Pseudocentris testudinea Meyrick, 1921

Species of moth

Pseudocentris is a monotypic moth genus in the family Depressariidae. Its only species, Pseudocentris testudinea, is found in Peru. Both the genus and species were first described by Edward Meyrick in 1921.

The wingspan is about 16 mm. The forewings are white, irregularly speckled with brownish with a white tuft on the fold at one-third, surrounded with grey irroration (sprinkles). There is some yellow-ochreous suffusion along the costa towards the base and a fascia of yellow-ochreous suffusion from two-fifths of the costa to beyond the middle of the dorsum, as well as a roundish blotch of suffused dark grey irroration in the disc at three-fourths. A yellow-ochreous spot is found on the costa beyond the middle and there is a very oblique irregular yellow-ochreous fasciate streak from the costa at three-fourths to the disc before the apex. There is also an irregular-edged yellow-ochreous streak along the termen from the apex to below the middle. The hindwings are dark grey.
