= Idiocrates =

Scientific classification
- Kingdom: Animalia
- Phylum: Arthropoda
- Class: Insecta
- Order: Lepidoptera
- Family: Depressariidae
- Subfamily: Depressariinae
- Genus: Idiocrates; Meyrick, 1909
- Species: I. balanitis

Binomial name
- Idiocrates balanitis Meyrick, 1909

Genus of moths

Idiocrates is a monotypic moth genus in the family Depressariidae. Its only species, Idiocrates balanitis, is found in Bolivia. Both the genus and species were first described by Edward Meyrick in 1909.

The wingspan is about 16 mm (0.63 in). The forewings are light bronzy brownish with an oblique dark fuscous spot on the base of the costa, nearly followed by a similar larger spot and beyond this an oblique white patch on the costa reaching to half and separated posteriorly by a dark fuscous strigula from an oblique white strigula followed by a dark fuscous patch suffused posteriorly. Beneath the white strigula is some yellowish suffusion and from between the first two dark costal spots proceeds an oblique irregular-dentate pale partly whitish-tinged line to near the dorsum, the basal space before this is mixed with dark fuscous, with a dark fuscous spot on the dorsum. There is a thick irregular dark fuscous longitudinal streak from beyond this above the middle of the disc to four-fifths, cut by a curved whitish line about the middle and another at two-thirds, and limited posteriorly by a deeply curved-dentate white line causing its extremity to be furcate. There is an elongate dark fuscous spot on the fold before the middle, edged with whitish posteriorly and the apical fifth of the wing is shining silvery metallic, including a transverse dark fuscous spot beneath the costa, below which is a yellowish-white ring resting on the lower part of the termen but incomplete anteriorly. There is also a yellowish-white line around the posterior part of the costa and termen. The hindwings are fuscous.
