= Filinota vociferans =

Scientific classification
- Kingdom: Animalia
- Phylum: Arthropoda
- Class: Insecta
- Order: Lepidoptera
- Family: Depressariidae
- Genus: Filinota
- Species: F. vociferans

Binomial name
- Filinota vociferans Meyrick, 1930

Species of moth

Filinota vociferans is a moth in the family Depressariidae. It was described by Edward Meyrick in 1930. It is found in Rio de Janeiro, Brazil.
