= Gonada cabima =

Scientific classification
- Kingdom: Animalia
- Phylum: Arthropoda
- Class: Insecta
- Order: Lepidoptera
- Family: Depressariidae
- Genus: Gonada
- Species: G. cabima

Binomial name
- Gonada cabima Busck, 1912

Species of moth

Gonada cabima is a moth in the family Depressariidae. It was described by August Busck in 1912. It is found in Panama.

The wingspan is about 23 mm. The forewings are reddish brown, rather lighter towards the terminal edge and strongly suffused with ochreous on the basal half of the dorsum. The first and second discal spots are small, inconspicuous black dots and there is a similar plical dot on the apical third of the fold. The hindwings are light reddish ochreous.
