= Erithyma trabeella =

Scientific classification
- Domain: Eukaryota
- Kingdom: Animalia
- Phylum: Arthropoda
- Class: Insecta
- Order: Lepidoptera
- Family: Depressariidae
- Genus: Erithyma
- Species: E. trabeella

Binomial name
- Erithyma trabeella (C. Felder, R. Felder & Rogenhofer, 1875)

Synonyms
- Oecophora trabeella Felder & Rogenhofer, 1875; Erithyma polychroma Meyrick, 1914

Species of moth

Erithyma trabeella is a moth in the family Depressariidae. It was described by Cajetan Felder, Rudolf Felder and Alois Friedrich Rogenhofer in 1875. It is found in Guyana, Brazil (Amazonas) and Peru.

The wingspan is 10–11 mm. The forewings are black with metallic-green blotches on the dorsum about one-fourth and the middle, narrowed upwards and reaching small violet-white marks on the costa. An orange blotch occupies the costal half from the middle to near the apex, connected by a bar with the dorsum at two-thirds, enclosing blue-metallic longitudinal marks beneath the costa at the anterior angle, and in the disc obliquely beyond and beneath this, and with a violet-white dot preceding it in the middle. There is a rounded purple-coppery blotch extending over the termen and tornus. The hindwings are dark fuscous.
