= Pisinidea viridis =

Scientific classification
- Kingdom: Animalia
- Phylum: Arthropoda
- Clade: Pancrustacea
- Class: Insecta
- Order: Lepidoptera
- Family: Depressariidae
- Genus: Pisinidea
- Species: P. viridis

Binomial name
- Pisinidea viridis Butler, 1883

Species of moth

Pisinidea viridis is a moth in the family Depressariidae. It was described by Arthur Gardiner Butler in 1883. It is found in Chile.

The wingspan is about 27 mm. The forewings are pea green with a rounded ferruginous spot at the end of the cell. The hindwings are sericeous (silky) whitey brown.
