= Trycherodes producta =

Scientific classification
- Domain: Eukaryota
- Kingdom: Animalia
- Phylum: Arthropoda
- Class: Insecta
- Order: Lepidoptera
- Family: Depressariidae
- Genus: Trycherodes
- Species: T. producta

Binomial name
- Trycherodes producta (Walsingham, 1912)

Synonyms
- Teratomorpha producta Walsingham, 1912

Species of moth

Trycherodes producta is a moth in the family Depressariidae. It was described by Lord Walsingham in 1912. It is found in Guatemala.

The wingspan is about 20 mm. The forewings are pale fawn ochreous, tinged with flesh colour, with a sprinkling of greyish fuscous scales, grouped in a reduplicated curved series commencing at the middle of the costa and terminating in a somewhat darker group on the dorsum before the tornus. A single small fuscous spot lies on the cell at one-third from the base. The hindwings are whitish ochreous.
