= Lucyna (moth) =

Scientific classification
- Domain: Eukaryota
- Kingdom: Animalia
- Phylum: Arthropoda
- Class: Insecta
- Order: Lepidoptera
- Family: Depressariidae
- Subfamily: Depressariinae
- Genus: Lucyna; Clarke, 1978

Genus of moths

Lucyna is a moth genus of the family Depressariidae.

== Species ==
- Lucyna fenestella (Zeller, 1874)
- Lucyna trifida Beéche, 2012
