= Thyromorpha =

Scientific classification
- Kingdom: Animalia
- Phylum: Arthropoda
- Class: Insecta
- Order: Lepidoptera
- Family: Depressariidae
- Subfamily: Depressariinae
- Genus: Thyromorpha; Turner, 1917
- Species: T. stibaropis

Binomial name
- Thyromorpha stibaropis Turner, 1917

Species of moth

Thyromorpha stibaropis is a moth in the family Depressariidae, and the only species in the genus Thyromorpha. It was described by Alfred Jefferis Turner in 1917 and is found in Australia, where it has been recorded from Queensland.

The wingspan is about 24 mm. The forewings are rather dark brown mixed with paler brown. Alternate bars of darker and lighter shade are found beneath the costa and the costal edge is slightly pinkish. There is a blackish discal dot in the disc at one-third containing a few central brown scales. A similar dot is found at two-thirds, the centre more whitish. The veins are minutely dotted with fuscous. The hindwings are grey.
