= Doina eremnogramma =

Scientific classification
- Kingdom: Animalia
- Phylum: Arthropoda
- Class: Insecta
- Order: Lepidoptera
- Family: Depressariidae
- Genus: Doina
- Species: D. eremnogramma

Binomial name
- Doina eremnogramma J. F. G. Clarke, 1978

Species of moth

Doina eremnogramma is a moth in the family Depressariidae. It was described by John Frederick Gates Clarke in 1978. It is found in Chile.

The wingspan is 28–31 mm. The forewings are cinereous. From the base of the wing, between veins 11 and 12, a fuscous line extends to almost the middle of the costa and between veins 9 and 10 and 10 and 11, short fuscous streaks are found. Similar but ill-defined lines are found between other veins and from the apical third of the costa, around the apex and along the termen to the tornus, is a series of 11 fuscous streaks. In the cell, a fuscous longitudinal streak and a greyish-fuscous shade are found and there is a short fuscous streak on the fold at about two-fifths. The apical two-fifths of the wing are lightly infuscated. The hindwings are sordid white, lightly infuscated and sparsely irrorated with small greyish-fuscous scales.
