= Doina lagneia =

Scientific classification
- Kingdom: Animalia
- Phylum: Arthropoda
- Class: Insecta
- Order: Lepidoptera
- Family: Depressariidae
- Genus: Doina
- Species: D. lagneia

Binomial name
- Doina lagneia J. F. G. Clarke, 1978

Species of moth

Doina lagneia is a moth in the family Depressariidae. It was described by John Frederick Gates Clarke in 1978. It is found in Chile.

The wingspan is 20–22 mm. The forewings are light ochraceous buff, with the extreme base of the costa fuscous. From the mid-costa around the apex and termen, a series of 11 fuscous spots is found, the last, on the tornus, more of a longitudinal streak. There is a fuscous spot at the basal third, in the cell and a similar, but larger spot on the fold and one at the end of the cell. The surface of the wing is sparsely irrorated with clay color and fuscous scales. The hindwings are ocherous white, darker toward the margins.
