= Afdera (moth) =

Scientific classification
- Kingdom: Animalia
- Phylum: Arthropoda
- Clade: Pancrustacea
- Class: Insecta
- Order: Lepidoptera
- Family: Depressariidae
- Subfamily: Depressariinae
- Genus: Afdera; Clarke, 1978

Genus of moths

Afdera is a moth genus in the family Depressariidae. The genus occurs in Chile and Argentina.

== Species ==
There are two recognized species:

- Afdera jimenae Ogden & Parra, 2001
- Afdera orphnaea (Meyrick, 1931)
