= Hozbeka =

Scientific classification
- Kingdom: Animalia
- Phylum: Arthropoda
- Class: Insecta
- Order: Lepidoptera
- Family: Depressariidae
- Subfamily: Depressariinae
- Genus: Hozbeka; Özdikmen, 2009
- Species: H. anomala

Binomial name
- Hozbeka anomala (J. F. G. Clarke, 1978)

Synonyms
- Talitha J. F. G. Clarke, 1978; Talitha anomala J. F. G. Clarke, 1978

Species of moth

Hozbeka is a monotypic moth genus in the family Oecophoridae erected by Hüseyin Özdikmen in 2009. Its only species, Hozbeka anomala, was described by John Frederick Gates Clarke in 1978. It is found in Chile.

The wingspan is about 23 mm. The ground color of the forewings is blackish fuscous, heavily overlaid with white. There is a blackish-fuscous spot at the basal fifth in the cell, followed at the basal third of the cell by a pair of confluent blackish-fuscous spots, followed by a pair of blackish-fuscous spots on the upper vein of the cell. There is a transverse broken blackish-fuscous bar at the end of the cell, extending to the tornus. There is a short blackish-fuscous bar from the apex along the termen. The hindwings are grayish fuscous, except for the cell, which is gray.
