= Maesara =

Scientific classification
- Kingdom: Animalia
- Phylum: Arthropoda
- Class: Insecta
- Order: Lepidoptera
- Family: Depressariidae
- Genus: Maesara; Clarke, 1968
- Species: M. gallegoi

Binomial name
- Maesara gallegoi Clarke, 1968

Species of moth

Maesara gallegoi is a moth in the family Depressariidae, and the only species in the genus Maesara. It was described by Clarke in 1968 and is found in Colombia.

The wingspan is 18–36 mm. The forewings are umber brown, the costa broadly edged with chestnut brown, this band narrowing toward the apex. The veins in the costal half of the wing are emphasized by chestnut brown. In the cell, at one-third, is an ochraceous buff spot mixed with a few black scales and on the fold, slightly beyond one-third, is a similar spot. There is a more conspicuous, well-defined, ochraceous buff spot at the end of the cell and there are ochraceous buff scales irregularly and sparsely scattered over the surface of the wing. The hindwings are greyish fuscous, thinly scaled basad.

The larvae feed on Pyrus malus, boring in the twigs of their host plant.

== Etymology ==
The species is named for Dr. F. Luis Gallego M., dean of South American entomology.
