= Himotica =

Scientific classification
- Kingdom: Animalia
- Phylum: Arthropoda
- Class: Insecta
- Order: Lepidoptera
- Family: Depressariidae
- Genus: Himotica; Meyrick, 1912
- Species: H. thyrsitis

Binomial name
- Himotica thyrsitis Meyrick, 1912

Genus of moths

Himotica is a monotypic moth genus in the family Depressariidae. Its only species, Himotica thyrsitis, is found in Brazil. Both the genus and species were first described by Edward Meyrick in 1912.

The wingspan is about 23 mm. The forewings are ochreous whitish with the upper part of the cell posteriorly, and the whole space between the cell and termen except towards the costa suffused with light brownish ochreous, with more or less pale streaks on the veins, and some dark fuscous suffusion between the veins, especially posteriorly. There is a fuscous marginal line around the apex. The hindwings are grey, the costa whitish suffused to the apex.
