= Scoliographa =

Scientific classification
- Kingdom: Animalia
- Phylum: Arthropoda
- Class: Insecta
- Order: Lepidoptera
- Family: Depressariidae
- Subfamily: Depressariinae
- Genus: Scoliographa; Meyrick, 1916
- Species: S. argospila

Binomial name
- Scoliographa argospila Meyrick, 1916

Genus of moths

Scoliographa is a monotypic moth genus in the family Depressariidae. Its only species, Scoliographa argospila, is found in Guyana. Both the genus and species were first described by Edward Meyrick in 1916.

The wingspan is 18–19 mm. The forewings are pale brownish with the basal fourth of the costa dark fuscous and with a broad irregular streak of dark brown suffusion along the submedian fold throughout. There is a dark fuscous dot in the disc above the middle and there are several snow-white markings edged with scattered black scales: a dot representing the first discal stigma, a minute dot on the fold beneath this, an irregularly angulated mark above the dorsum at one-third, a somewhat Z-shaped mark of which the upper extremity is almost separated and represents the second discal stigma, its lower angle projecting anteriorly on the fold, and a small round spot above the dorsum before the tornus. There is a very indefinite fascia of dark brown suffusion from three-fourths of the costa to the tornus and a marginal series of blackish marks around the posterior part of the costa and termen. The hindwings are whitish ochreous.
