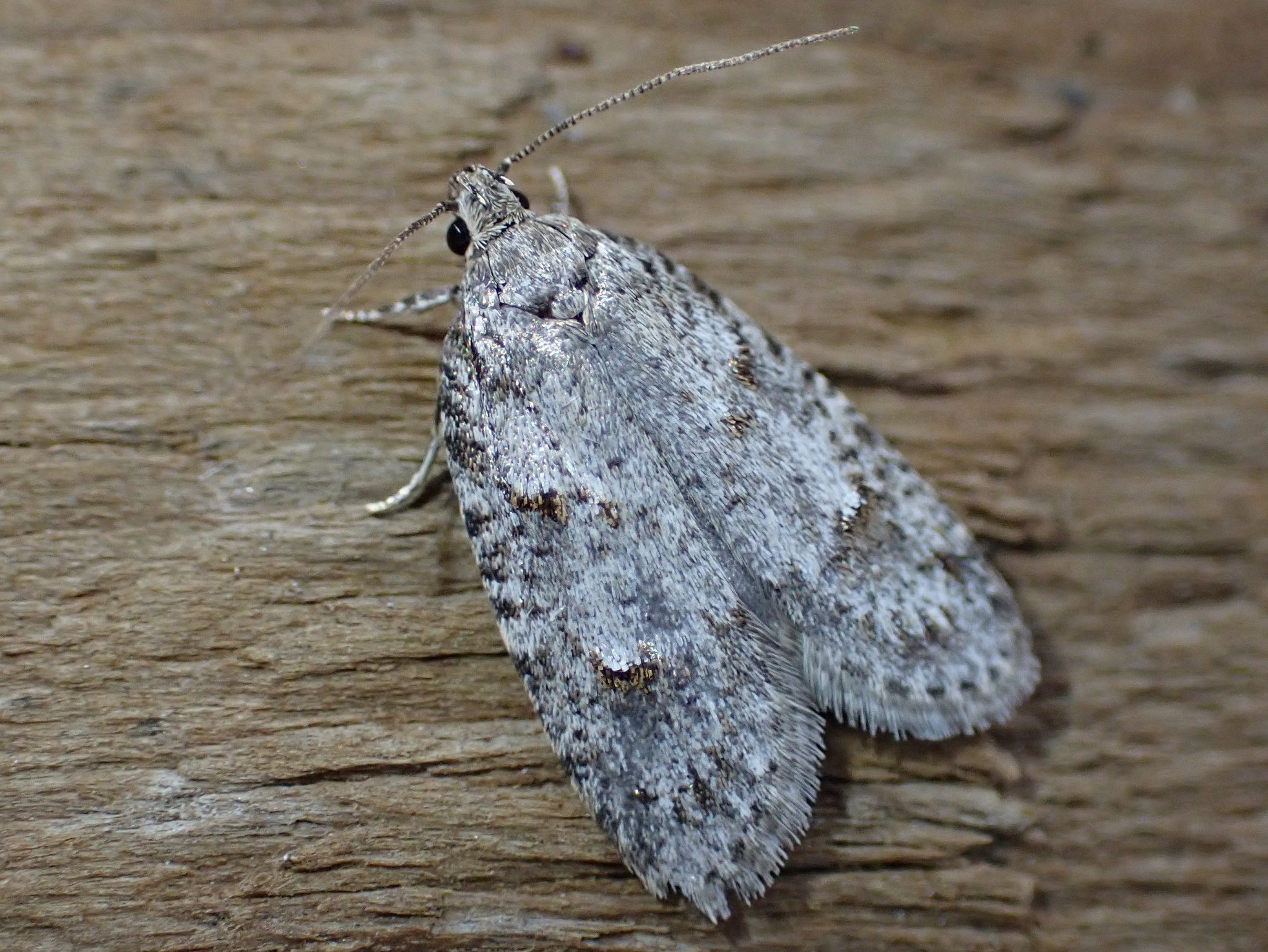

Scientific classification
- Domain: Eukaryota
- Kingdom: Animalia
- Phylum: Arthropoda
- Class: Insecta
- Order: Lepidoptera
- Family: Depressariidae
- Genus: Bibarrambla; Clarke, 1941
- Species: B. allenella

Binomial name
- Bibarrambla allenella (Walsingham, 1882)

Synonyms
- Semioscopis allenella Walsingham, 1882

= Bibarrambla =

Bibarrambla allenella

Species of moth

Bibarrambla is a genus of moths in the family Depressariidae. It is monotypic, with its only species, Bibarrambla allenella, commonly known as the bog bibarrambla moth, described by Thomas de Grey in 1882. It is found in North America, where it has been recorded from Nova Scotia to Minnesota, North Carolina, New York, Connecticut and Maryland.

The larvae feed on Alnus and Betula species.
