= Erithyma =

Scientific classification
- Kingdom: Animalia
- Phylum: Arthropoda
- Class: Insecta
- Order: Lepidoptera
- Family: Depressariidae
- Genus: Erithyma; Meyrick, 1914

Genus of moths

Erithyma is a moth genus of the family Depressariidae.

== Species ==
- Erithyma cyanoplecta Meyrick, 1914
- Erithyma trabeella (Felder & Rogenhofer, 1875)
