= Doshia =

Scientific classification
- Kingdom: Animalia
- Phylum: Arthropoda
- Class: Insecta
- Order: Lepidoptera
- Family: Depressariidae
- Genus: Doshia; J. F. G. Clarke, 1978
- Species: D. miltopeza

Binomial name
- Doshia miltopeza J. F. G. Clarke, 1978

Monotypic moth genus

Doshia is a monotypic moth genus in the family Depressariidae. Its only species, Doshia miltopeza, is found in Chile. Both the genus and species were described by John Frederick Gates Clarke in 1978.

The wingspan is about 20 mm. The forewings are cinnamon buff with the extreme costal edge white, bordered inwardly by a russet-vinaceous line. At the costal two-thirds, the slender white edge of costa broadens to form a white spot, and beyond this two small russet-vinaceous spots invade the white of costa. The basal third of the wing is marked with numerous, very small, fuscous dots and the outer third of the wing is similarly marked, the spots following the veins. The hindwings are greyish fuscous.
