= Gonada =

Scientific classification
- Domain: Eukaryota
- Kingdom: Animalia
- Phylum: Arthropoda
- Class: Insecta
- Order: Lepidoptera
- Family: Depressariidae
- Genus: Gonada; Busck, 1911

Genus of moths

Gonada is a moth genus of the family Depressariidae.

== Species ==
- Gonada cabima Busck, 1912
- Gonada falculinella Busck, 1911
- Gonada flavidorsis Meyrick, 1930
- Gonada phosphorodes Meyrick, 1922
- Gonada pyronota Meyrick, 1924
- Gonada rubens Meyrick, 1916
