= Talitha (thrips) =

Scientific classification
- Kingdom: Animalia
- Phylum: Arthropoda
- Class: Insecta
- Order: Thysanoptera
- Family: Phlaeothripidae
- Genus: Talitha; Faure, 1958

Genus of thrips

Talitha is a genus of thrips in the family Phlaeothripidae.

== Species ==
- Talitha cincta
- Talitha fusca
- Talitha glandifera
