= List of moths of Australia (Depressariidae) =

Partial list of Australian moths

This is a list of the Australian species of the family Depressariidae. It also acts as an index to the species articles and forms part of the full List of moths of Australia.

- Barantola panarista (Turner, 1917)
- Barantola pulcherrima Walker, 1864
- Bleptochiton leucotrigona Turner, 1947
- Doleromima hypoxantha (Lower, 1897)
- Eclecta aurorella Meyrick, 1883
- Ectaga garcia Becker, 1994
- Enchocrates glaucopis Meyrick, 1883
- Enchocrates habroschema (Turner, 1946)
- Enchocrates phaedryntis Meyrick, 1887
- Enchocrates picrophylla Meyrick, 1886
- Enchocrates vasperascens Meyrick, 1921
- Enteremna dolerastis (Meyrick, 1890)
- Enteremna pallida (Turner, 1939)
- Euprionocera geminipuncta Turner, 1896
- Eutorna diaula Meyrick, 1906
- Eutorna epicnephes Meyrick, 1906
- Eutorna eurygramma Meyrick, 1906
- Eutorna generalis Meyrick, 1921
- Eutorna intonsa Meyrick, 1906
- Eutorna leptographa Meyrick, 1906
- Eutorna pabulicola Meyrick, 1906
- Eutorna phaulocosma Meyrick, 1906
- Eutorna plumbeola Turner, 1947
- Eutorna rubida (Turner, 1919)
- Eutorna spintherias Meyrick, 1906
- Eutorna tricasis Meyrick, 1906
- Gymnoceros nipholeuca (Turner, 1946)
- Gymnoceros pallidula Turner, 1946
- Haereta cryphimaea Turner, 1947
- Haereta niphosceles Turner, 1947
- Heterobathra xiphosema Lower, 1901
- Lepidozancla zatrephes Turner, 1916
- Loboptila cyphoma (Meyrick, 1915)
- Loboptila leurodes Turner, 1919
- Mimozela rhoditis Meyrick, 1914
- Notosara acosmeta (Common, 1964)
- Notosara nephelotis Meyrick, 1890
- Octasphales chorderes Meyrick, 1902
- Octasphales eubrocha Turner, 1917
- Pedois amaurophanes (Turner, 1947)
- Pedois anthracias Lower, 1902
- Pedois argillea (Turner, 1927)
- Pedois ceramora (Meyrick, 1902)
- Pedois cosmopoda (Turner, 1900)
- Pedois epinephela (Turner, 1947)
- Pedois haploceros (Turner, 1946)
- Pedois humerana (Walker, 1863)
- Pedois lewinella (Newman, 1856)
- Pedois lutea (Turner, 1927)
- Pedois rhaphidias (Turner, 1917)
- Pedois rhodomita (Turner, 1900)
- Pedois sarcinodes (Meyrick, 1921)
- Pedois tripunctella (Walker, 1864)
- Peritornenta bacchata (Meyrick, 1914)
- Peritornenta circulatella (Walker, 1864)
- Peritornenta lissopis (Turner, 1947)
- Peritornenta minans (Meyrick, 1921)
- Peritornenta rhodophanes (Meyrick, 1902)
- Peritornenta stigmatias Turner, 1900
- Peritornenta thyellia (Meyrick, 1902)
- Psorosticha zizyphi (Stainton, 1859)
- Scorpiopsis pyrobola (Meyrick, 1887)
- Scorpiopsis rhodoglauca Meyrick, 1930
- Thalamarchella alveola (R. Felder & Rogenhofer, 1875)
- Thalamarchella aneureta Common, 1964
- Thalamarchella robinsoni Common, 1964
- Thyromorpha stibaropis Turner, 1917
- Tonica effractella (Snellen, 1878)
