= Scorpiopsis exanthistis =

Scientific classification
- Kingdom: Animalia
- Phylum: Arthropoda
- Clade: Pancrustacea
- Class: Insecta
- Order: Lepidoptera
- Family: Depressariidae
- Genus: Scorpiopsis
- Species: S. exanthistis

Binomial name
- Scorpiopsis exanthistis Meyrick, 1930

Species of moth

Scorpiopsis exanthistis is a moth in the family Depressariidae. It was described by Edward Meyrick in 1930. It is found in New Guinea.

The wingspan is about 14 mm.
