= Ectaga =

Scientific classification
- Domain: Eukaryota
- Kingdom: Animalia
- Phylum: Arthropoda
- Class: Insecta
- Order: Lepidoptera
- Family: Depressariidae
- Subfamily: Depressariinae
- Genus: Ectaga; Walsingham, 1912

Genus of moths

Ectaga is a genus of moths of the family Depressariidae.

== Species ==
- Ectaga canescens Walsingham, 1912
- Ectaga garcia Becker, 1994
- Ectaga lenta Clarke, 1956
- Ectaga lictor Walsingham, 1912
- Ectaga promeces Walsingham, 1912
