= Ectaga lenta =

Scientific classification
- Domain: Eukaryota
- Kingdom: Animalia
- Phylum: Arthropoda
- Class: Insecta
- Order: Lepidoptera
- Family: Depressariidae
- Genus: Ectaga
- Species: E. lenta

Binomial name
- Ectaga lenta Clarke, 1956

Species of moth

Ectaga lenta is a moth in the family Depressariidae. It was described by Clarke in 1956. It is found in Argentina.
