= Gymnoceros =

Scientific classification
- Kingdom: Animalia
- Phylum: Arthropoda
- Class: Insecta
- Order: Lepidoptera
- Family: Depressariidae
- Subfamily: Depressariinae
- Genus: Gymnoceros; Turner, 1946

Genus of moths

Gymnoceros is a moth genus of the family Depressariidae.

== Species ==
- Gymnoceros nipholeuca (Turner, 1946)
- Gymnoceros pallidula Turner, 1946
