= Eutorna leonidi =

Scientific classification
- Kingdom: Animalia
- Phylum: Arthropoda
- Clade: Pancrustacea
- Class: Insecta
- Order: Lepidoptera
- Family: Depressariidae
- Genus: Eutorna
- Species: E. leonidi

Binomial name
- Eutorna leonidi Lvovsky, 1979

Species of moth

Eutorna leonidi is a moth in the family Depressariidae. It was described by Alexandr L. Lvovsky in 1979. It is found in Russia (south-eastern Siberia, Kunashir).
