= Loboptila =

Scientific classification
- Domain: Eukaryota
- Kingdom: Animalia
- Phylum: Arthropoda
- Class: Insecta
- Order: Lepidoptera
- Family: Depressariidae
- Subfamily: Depressariinae
- Genus: Loboptila; Turner, 1919

Genus of moths

Loboptila is a moth genus of the family Depressariidae.

== Species ==
- Loboptila cyphoma (Meyrick, 1915)
- Loboptila leurodes Turner, 1919
