= Heterobathra bimacula =

Scientific classification
- Kingdom: Animalia
- Phylum: Arthropoda
- Class: Insecta
- Order: Lepidoptera
- Family: Depressariidae
- Genus: Heterobathra
- Species: H. bimacula

Binomial name
- Heterobathra bimacula Lower, 1901

Species of moth

Heterobathra bimacula is a moth in the family Depressariidae. It was described by Oswald Bertram Lower in 1901. It is found in Australia, where it has been recorded from New South Wales.

The wingspan is about 12 mm. The forewings are dark fuscous, mixed with blackish and with a distinct black dot encircled with white in the middle of the disc before the middle. A second, similar one is found below and slightly beyond and there is an obscure Y-shaped blackish mark from the base, just reaching the first encircling ring. The veins towards the termen are more or less outlined with black and there is a well-defined row of blackish dots along the termen, continued to the anal angle. The hindwings are dull fuscous.
