= Eutorna punctinigrella =

Scientific classification
- Kingdom: Animalia
- Phylum: Arthropoda
- Class: Insecta
- Order: Lepidoptera
- Family: Depressariidae
- Genus: Eutorna
- Species: E. punctinigrella

Binomial name
- Eutorna punctinigrella Viette, 1955

Species of moth

Eutorna punctinigrella is a moth in the family Depressariidae. It was described by Pierre Viette in 1955. It is found on Madagascar.
