= Thalamarchella =

Scientific classification
- Kingdom: Animalia
- Phylum: Arthropoda
- Class: Insecta
- Order: Lepidoptera
- Family: Depressariidae
- Subfamily: Depressariinae
- Genus: Thalamarchella; T. B. Fletcher, 1940

Synonyms
- Thalamarchis Meyrick, 1904 (preocc. Meyrick, 1897)

Genus of moths

Thalamarchella is a genus of moths of the family Depressariidae described by Thomas Bainbrigge Fletcher in 1940.

== Species ==
- Thalamarchella alveola Felder & Rogenhofer, 1875
- Thalamarchella aneureta Common, 1964
- Thalamarchella robinsoni Common, 1964
