= Octasphales =

Scientific classification
- Kingdom: Animalia
- Phylum: Arthropoda
- Class: Insecta
- Order: Lepidoptera
- Family: Depressariidae
- Subfamily: Depressariinae
- Genus: Octasphales; Meyrick, 1886

Genus of moths

Octasphales is a moth genus of the family Depressariidae.

== Species ==
- Octasphales charitopa Meyrick, 1886
- Octasphales chorderes Meyrick, 1902
- Octasphales eubrocha Turner, 1917
- Octasphales niphadosticha Meyrick, 1930
- Octasphales stellifera Meyrick, 1914
