= Ectaga promeces =

Scientific classification
- Domain: Eukaryota
- Kingdom: Animalia
- Phylum: Arthropoda
- Class: Insecta
- Order: Lepidoptera
- Family: Depressariidae
- Genus: Ectaga
- Species: E. promeces

Binomial name
- Ectaga promeces Walsingham, 1912

Species of moth

Ectaga promeces is a moth in the family Depressariidae. It was described by Thomas de Grey, 6th Baron Walsingham, in 1912. It is found in Guatemala.

The wingspan is about 19 mm. The forewings are fawn-brown, mixed with brownish fuscous and some brownish cinereous scaling. There is an elongate patch of raised brownish fuscous scales immediately below the middle of the fold and a series of four small discal spots, also consisting of raised brownish fuscous scales being distributed alternately along the upper and lower margins of the cell, the first and third in the upper series, the second and fourth in the lower, the latter about the lower angle of the cell. The hindwings are greyish brown, slightly paler toward the base.
