= Octasphales niphadosticha =

Scientific classification
- Kingdom: Animalia
- Phylum: Arthropoda
- Class: Insecta
- Order: Lepidoptera
- Family: Depressariidae
- Genus: Octasphales
- Species: O. niphadosticha

Binomial name
- Octasphales niphadosticha Meyrick, 1930

Species of moth

Octasphales niphadosticha is a moth in the family Depressariidae. It was described by Edward Meyrick in 1930. It is found in New Guinea.

The wingspan is about 17 mm. The forewings are grey, darker on the veins. The hindwings are grey.
