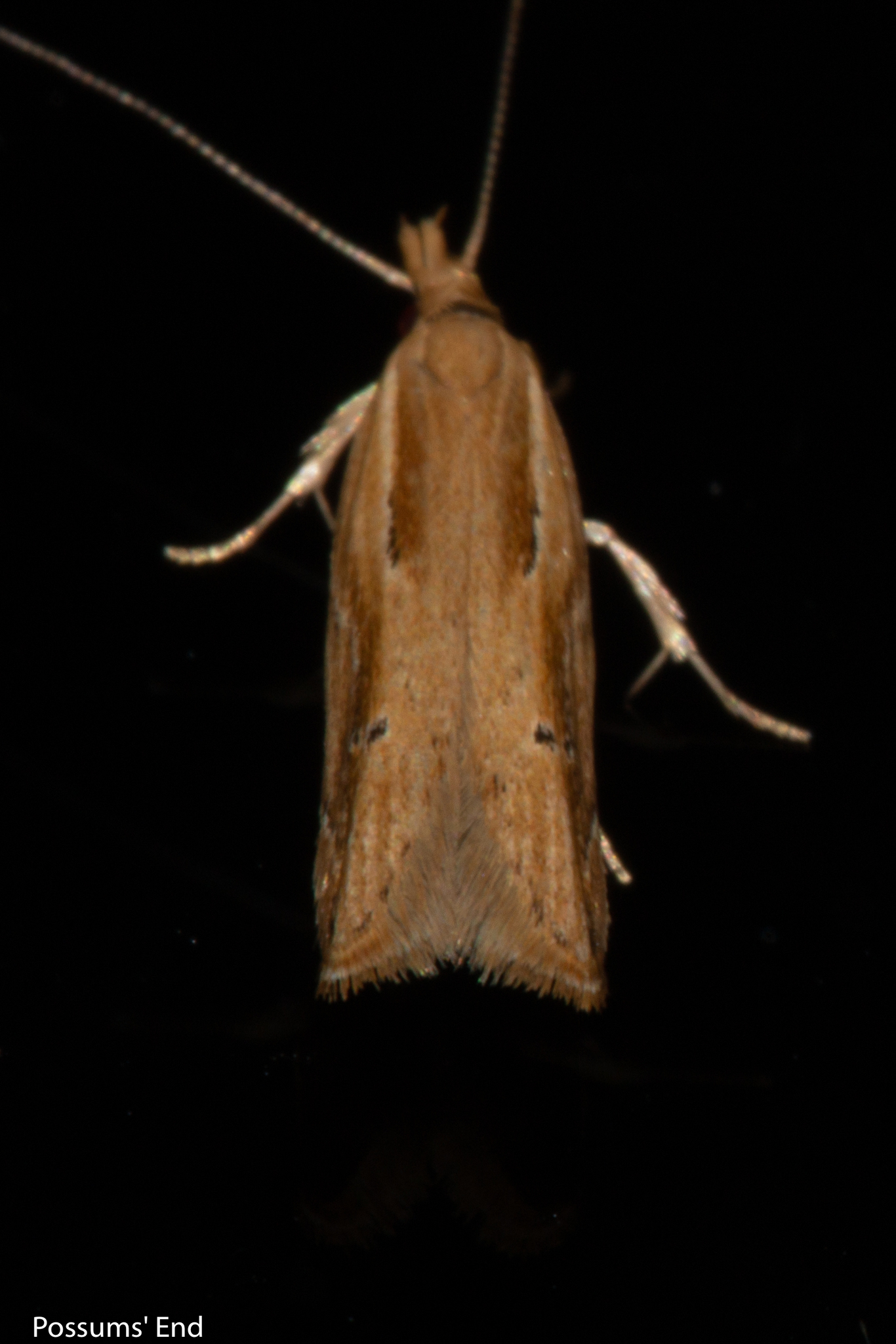

Scientific classification
- Kingdom: Animalia
- Phylum: Arthropoda
- Class: Insecta
- Order: Lepidoptera
- Family: Depressariidae
- Genus: Eutorna
- Species: E. symmorpha

Binomial name
- Eutorna symmorpha Meyrick, 1889

= Eutorna symmorpha =

Species of moth

Eutorna symmorpha is a moth in the family Depressariidae. It was described by Edward Meyrick in 1889. It is endemic to New Zealand.

The wingspan is 12–14 mm. The forewings are yellow ochreous, sometimes obscurely streaked with whitish ochreous between the veins, the veins more reddish ochreous or brownish ochreous. There is a straight, slender, reddish-brown streak from the middle of the base to the disc at two-fifths, terminating in a small blackish spot, cloudy beneath, above sharply defined and sometimes margined with an ochreous-whitish streak. There is a more or less distinct reddish-brown streak from the disc before the middle to the costa before the apex, terminating in some black scales and there are two black dots transversely placed in the disc at two-thirds, as well as some black scales on the hindmargin. The hindwings are light grey.
