= Ectaga canescens =

Scientific classification
- Domain: Eukaryota
- Kingdom: Animalia
- Phylum: Arthropoda
- Class: Insecta
- Order: Lepidoptera
- Family: Depressariidae
- Genus: Ectaga
- Species: E. canescens

Binomial name
- Ectaga canescens Walsingham, 1912

Species of moth

Ectaga canescens is a moth in the family Depressariidae. It was described by Walsingham in 1912. It is found in Mexico (Guerrero).

The wingspan is about 16 mm. The forewings are hoary grey, profusely sprinkled with brownish and brownish fuscous scaling, forming a somewhat dense shade from the costa to the middle of the fold, but leaving the basal, dorsal and terminal portions of the wing less obscure, with the exception of a narrow, terminal shade continued around the apex, and a small spot at the extreme base of the costa. The hindwings are straw-whitish, with a brownish cinereous tinge toward the apex.
