= Eutorna insidiosa =

Scientific classification
- Kingdom: Animalia
- Phylum: Arthropoda
- Class: Insecta
- Order: Lepidoptera
- Family: Depressariidae
- Genus: Eutorna
- Species: E. insidiosa

Binomial name
- Eutorna insidiosa Meyrick, 1910

Species of moth

Eutorna insidiosa is a moth in the family Depressariidae. It was described by Edward Meyrick in 1910. It is found in India (Assam).

The wingspan is 10–13 mm. The forewings are deep ochreous with the costal edge blackish towards the base and with a broad ferruginous-brown streak beneath the fold from the base to the tornus, suffused beneath and posteriorly, edged above with some black scales and then with whitish suffusion. There is a triangular patch of ferruginous-brown suffusion extending on the costa from two-fifths to near the apex and reaching half across the wing, edged anteriorly by a very oblique ochreous-whitish streak preceded towards the costa by some blackish irroration, and enclosing a shorter similar streak from the costa at three-fourths, the second discal stigma is round and black, edged with ochreous whitish and there are some blackish scales along the termen. The hindwings are rather dark grey.
