= Eutorna diluvialis =

Scientific classification
- Kingdom: Animalia
- Phylum: Arthropoda
- Class: Insecta
- Order: Lepidoptera
- Family: Depressariidae
- Genus: Eutorna
- Species: E. diluvialis

Binomial name
- Eutorna diluvialis Meyrick, 1913

Species of moth

Eutorna diluvialis is a moth in the family Depressariidae. It was described by Edward Meyrick in 1913. It is found in Madagascar, South Africa and the Democratic Republic of the Congo (Orientale).

The wingspan is about 17 mm. The forewings are brownish ochreous, with a few scattered dark fuscous specks, the costa and veins very obscurely streaked with whitish ochreous. The plical and second discal stigmata are black and there are some small groups of black scales around the posterior part of the costa and termen. The hindwings are pale greyish.
