= Scorpiopsis diplaneta =

Scientific classification
- Domain: Eukaryota
- Kingdom: Animalia
- Phylum: Arthropoda
- Class: Insecta
- Order: Lepidoptera
- Family: Depressariidae
- Genus: Scorpiopsis
- Species: S. diplaneta

Binomial name
- Scorpiopsis diplaneta (Meyrick, 1930)

Synonyms
- Scorpiopisi diplaneta Meyrick, 1930

Species of moth

Scorpiopsis diplaneta is a moth in the family Depressariidae. It was described by Edward Meyrick in 1930 and is found in New Guinea.

Its wingspan is 18–19 mm.
