= Scorpiopsis =

Scientific classification
- Domain: Eukaryota
- Kingdom: Animalia
- Phylum: Arthropoda
- Class: Insecta
- Order: Lepidoptera
- Family: Depressariidae
- Subfamily: Depressariinae
- Genus: Scorpiopsis; Turner, 1894

Synonyms
- Cerycostola Meyrick, 1902

Genus of moths

Scorpiopsis is a moth genus of the family Depressariidae.

== Species ==
- Scorpiopsis diplaneta (Meyrick, 1930)
- Scorpiopsis exanthistis Meyrick, 1930
- Scorpiopsis pyrobola (Meyrick, 1887)
- Scorpiopsis rhodoglauca Meyrick, 1930
