= Enchocrates vesperascens =

Scientific classification
- Domain: Eukaryota
- Kingdom: Animalia
- Phylum: Arthropoda
- Class: Insecta
- Order: Lepidoptera
- Family: Depressariidae
- Genus: Enchocrates
- Species: E. vesperascens

Binomial name
- Enchocrates vesperascens Meyrick, 1921

Species of moth

Enchocrates vesperascens is a moth in the family Depressariidae. It was described by Edward Meyrick in 1921. It is found in Australia, where it has been recorded from South Australia.

The wingspan is about 19 mm. The forewings are grey, speckled whitish, with irregular dark grey irroration. There are undefined markings of dark grey suffusion: an oblique blotch from the base of the costa confluent beneath with a transverse blotch from the costa at one-fourth, transverse blotches from the costa at the middle and two-thirds, and indications of a subterminal shade. The hindwings are pale grey.
