= Enteremna =

Scientific classification
- Domain: Eukaryota
- Kingdom: Animalia
- Phylum: Arthropoda
- Class: Insecta
- Order: Lepidoptera
- Family: Depressariidae
- Subfamily: Depressariinae
- Genus: Enteremna; Meyrick, 1917

Synonyms
- Blacophanes Turner, 1939

Genus of moths

Enteremna is a moth genus of the family Depressariidae.

== Species ==
- Enteremna dolerastis (Meyrick, 1890)
- Enteremna pallida (Turner, 1939)
