= Octasphales charitopa =

Scientific classification
- Kingdom: Animalia
- Phylum: Arthropoda
- Class: Insecta
- Order: Lepidoptera
- Family: Depressariidae
- Genus: Octasphales
- Species: O. charitopa

Binomial name
- Octasphales charitopa Meyrick, 1886

Species of moth

Octasphales charitopa is a moth in the family Depressariidae. It was described by Edward Meyrick in 1886. It is found in New Guinea.

The wingspan is about 16 mm. The forewings are whitish, somewhat suffused with pale greyish, and marked with numerous small cloudy dark grey spots, posteriorly coalescing to form an oblique fascia from the middle of the costa to the anal angle, narrow on the upper half, dilated posteriorly on the lower half into a large blotch extending almost to the hind margin, and connected by a bar with the costa before the apex. The costal edge is narrowly light rose-pink and there is a dark grey hindmarginal line. The hindwings are grey, lighter towards the base.
