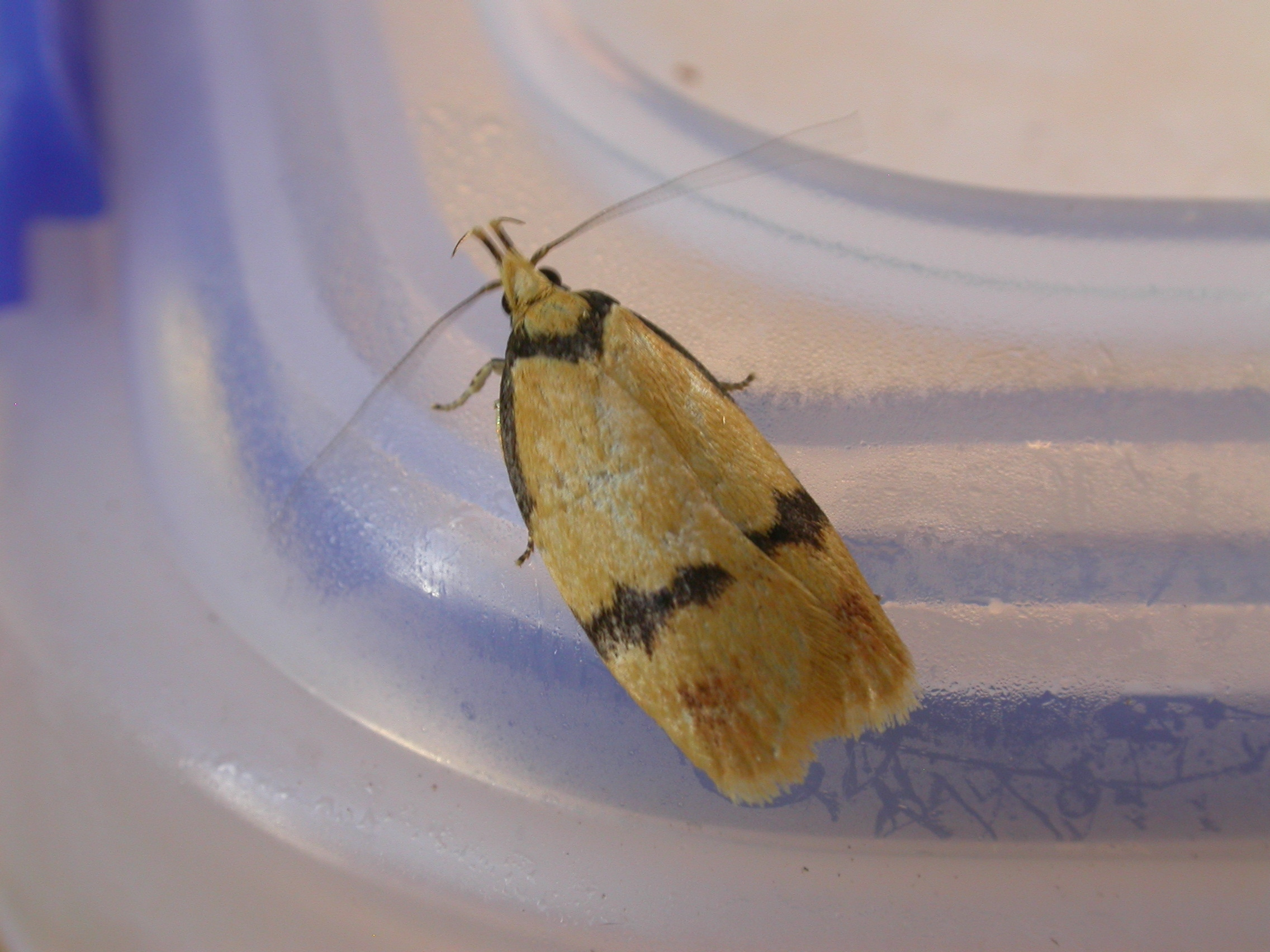
- Pedois humerana

Scientific classification
- Domain: Eukaryota
- Kingdom: Animalia
- Phylum: Arthropoda
- Class: Insecta
- Order: Lepidoptera
- Family: Depressariidae
- Subfamily: Depressariinae
- Genus: Pedois; Lower, 1894

Type species
- Pedois neurosticha Lower, 1894

Species
- See text

= Pedois =

Genus of moths

Pedois is a genus of moths of the family Depressariidae.

== Species ==
- Pedois amaurophanes (Turner, 1947)
- Pedois anthracias Lower, 1902
- Pedois argillea (Turner, 1927)
- Pedois ceramora (Meyrick, 1902)
- Pedois cosmopoda Turner, 1900
- Pedois epinephela (Turner, 1947)
- Pedois haploceros (Turner, 1946)
- Pedois humerana (Walker, 1863)
- Pedois lewinella (Newman, 1856)
- Pedois lutea (Turner, 1927)
- Pedois rhaphidias (Turner, 1917)
- Pedois rhodomita Turner, 1900
- Pedois sarcinodes (Meyrick, 1921)
- Pedois tripunctella (Walker, 1864)
