= Peritornenta gennaea =

Scientific classification
- Kingdom: Animalia
- Phylum: Arthropoda
- Class: Insecta
- Order: Lepidoptera
- Family: Depressariidae
- Genus: Peritornenta
- Species: P. gennaea

Binomial name
- Peritornenta gennaea (Meyrick, 1923)

Synonyms
- Peritorneuta gennaea Meyrick, 1923

Species of moth

Peritornenta gennaea is a moth in the family Depressariidae. It was described by Edward Meyrick in 1923. It is found in Fiji.

== Characteristics ==
The wingspan is about 15 mm.

The forewings are whitish, closely irrorated grey, and with scattered small black dots (especially a subcostal and subdorsal series posteriorly, and on the veins towards the termen). The veins are white-lined near the termen, but may also possess a short streak of pinkish suffusion on the fold beneath the middle of the wing, as well as a subcrescentic black-ish mark on the end of the cell. Beyond this a cloudy blotch of darker grey irroration (suffused and pink-ish). There may also be a suffused darker grey semi-oval blotch on the costa somewhat beyond the middle and a curved-angulated whitish shade at three-fourths, followed by some darker grey suffusion with a slight pinkish tinge. The hindwings are grey.
