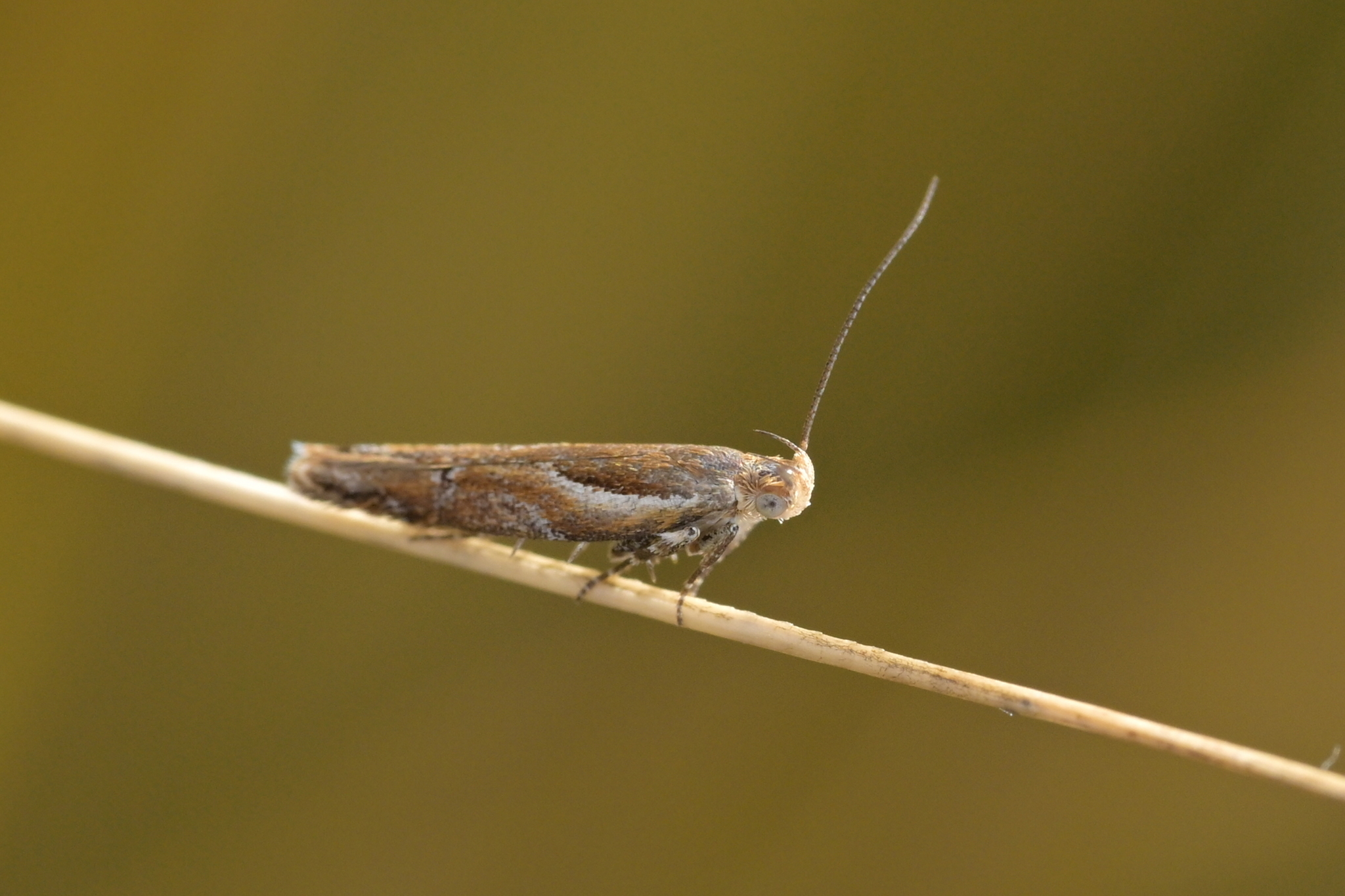
- Specimen seen at Ben Lomond near Queenstown

Scientific classification
- Kingdom: Animalia
- Phylum: Arthropoda
- Class: Insecta
- Order: Lepidoptera
- Family: Depressariidae
- Genus: Eutorna
- Species: E. caryochroa

Binomial name
- Eutorna caryochroa Meyrick, 1889

= Eutorna caryochroa =

Species of moth

Eutorna caryochroa is a species of moth in the family Depressariidae. It was described by Edward Meyrick in 1889 and is endemic to New Zealand. This species is found in both the North and South Islands. The larvae of this species are leaf miners and prefer damp grassland habitat. The adults are on the wing in December and January. They are day flying moths, they frequent forest and scrub, and have a habit of basking on leaves in the sunshine. They have been collected by beating shrubbery.

== Taxonomy ==
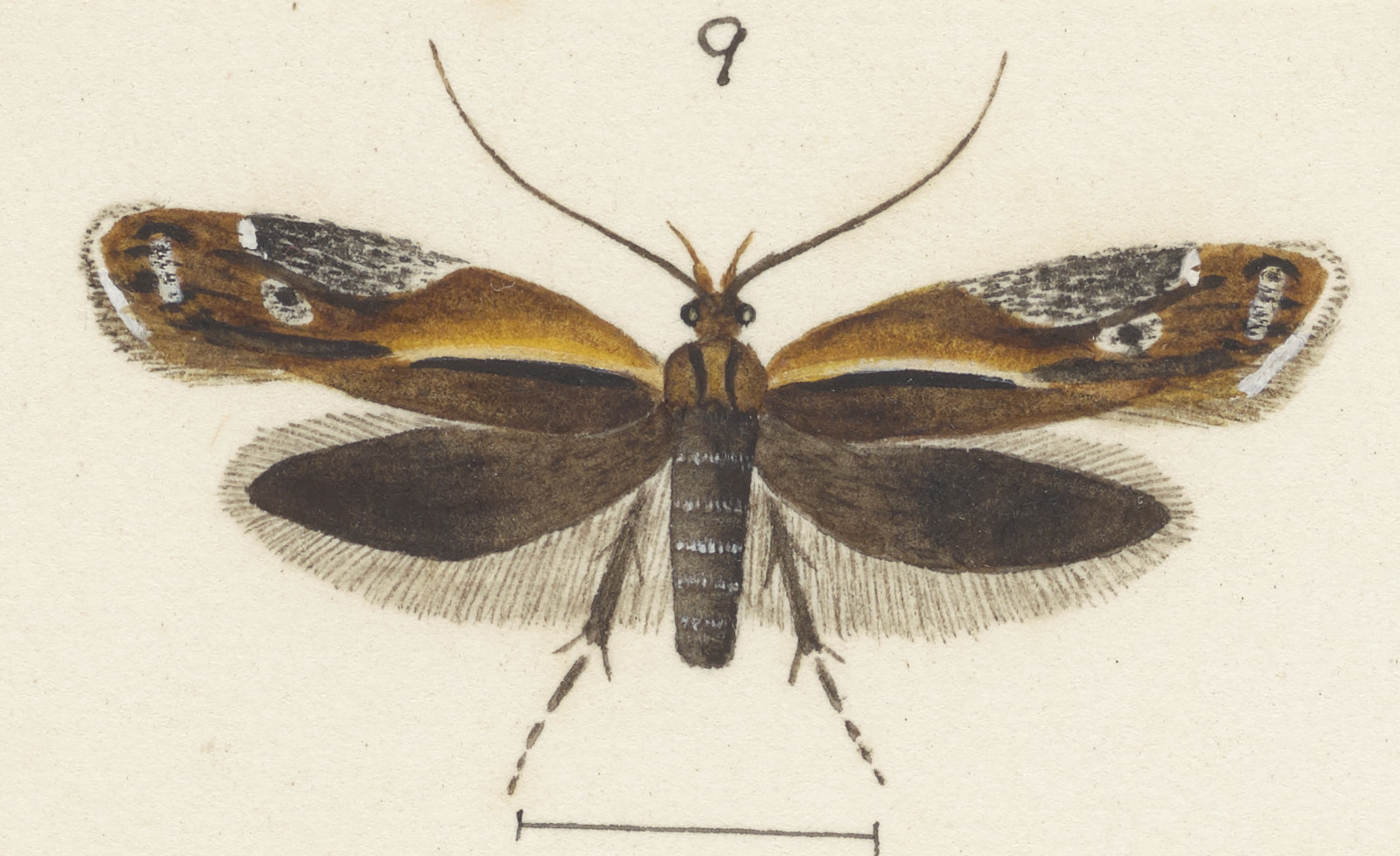
Illustration of female

E. caryochroa was first described by Edward Meyrick in 1889 using specimens collected at Castle Hill, Lake Wakatipu, Dunedin and Invercargill. The male lectotype specimen, held at the Natural History Museum, London, was collected in reserve bush and forest in Dunedin.

== Description ==
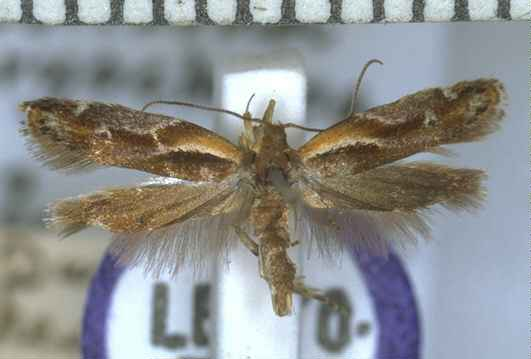
Male lectotype of Eutorna caryochroa

The wingspan is 11–12 mm. The forewings are rather dark ferruginous brown with an upwards-curved yellowish-white streak from the middle of the base to two-thirds of the disc, margined beneath with blackish, above with bright yellow ochreous, which extends to the costa towards the base. There is a slender white oblique streak from two-thirds of the costa to the middle of the disc, margining a triangular costal suffused patch of purplish-grey and whitish scales, beneath which is sometimes a longitudinal blackish suffusion. A black dot is found in the disc at two-thirds, surrounded by a yellowish-white ring. There are some purplish-grey scales towards the posterior half of the inner margin and a small white spot on the costa at four-fifths, beyond which is a blackish suffusion. There is also an obscure irregular whitish streak along the hindmargin, followed by some black scales. The hindwings are rather dark bronzy fuscous.

== Distribution ==
This species is endemic to New Zealand. It has been observed in the North Island in the Central Plateau, Napier, as well as in Wellington and also at Ōtira River, Castle Hill, Lake Wakatipu, Dunedin and Invercargill in the South Island. George Hudson regarded this species as being rare in the Wellington region and T. H. Davis held the same view for populations of this moth in Napier .

== Behaviour ==
The adults of this species are on the wing in December and January. It is a day flying moth and frequents forest and scrub habitat. It has been observed basking on leaves in full sun and Hudson hypothesises that it may have an attraction to totara. It has been collected by beating shrubbery.

== Habitat and hosts ==
E. caryochroa larvae are leaf miners and favour low growing plants in damp or estuary grassland habitat.
