= Heterobathra =

Scientific classification
- Kingdom: Animalia
- Phylum: Arthropoda
- Class: Insecta
- Order: Lepidoptera
- Family: Depressariidae
- Subfamily: Depressariinae
- Genus: Heterobathra; Lower, 1901

Genus of moths

Heterobathra is a moth genus of the family Depressariidae.

== Species ==
- Heterobathra bimacula Lower, 1901
- Heterobathra votiva Meyrick, 1922
- Heterobathra xiphosema Lower, 1901
