= Octasphales stellifera =

Scientific classification
- Kingdom: Animalia
- Phylum: Arthropoda
- Class: Insecta
- Order: Lepidoptera
- Family: Depressariidae
- Genus: Octasphales
- Species: O. stellifera

Binomial name
- Octasphales stellifera Meyrick, 1914

Species of moth

Octasphales stellifera is a moth in the family Depressariidae. It was described by Edward Meyrick in 1914. It is found in New Guinea.

The wingspan is about 23 mm. The forewings are light pinkish grey, strewn with suffused white dots arranged in longitudinal rows. The hindwings are grey.
