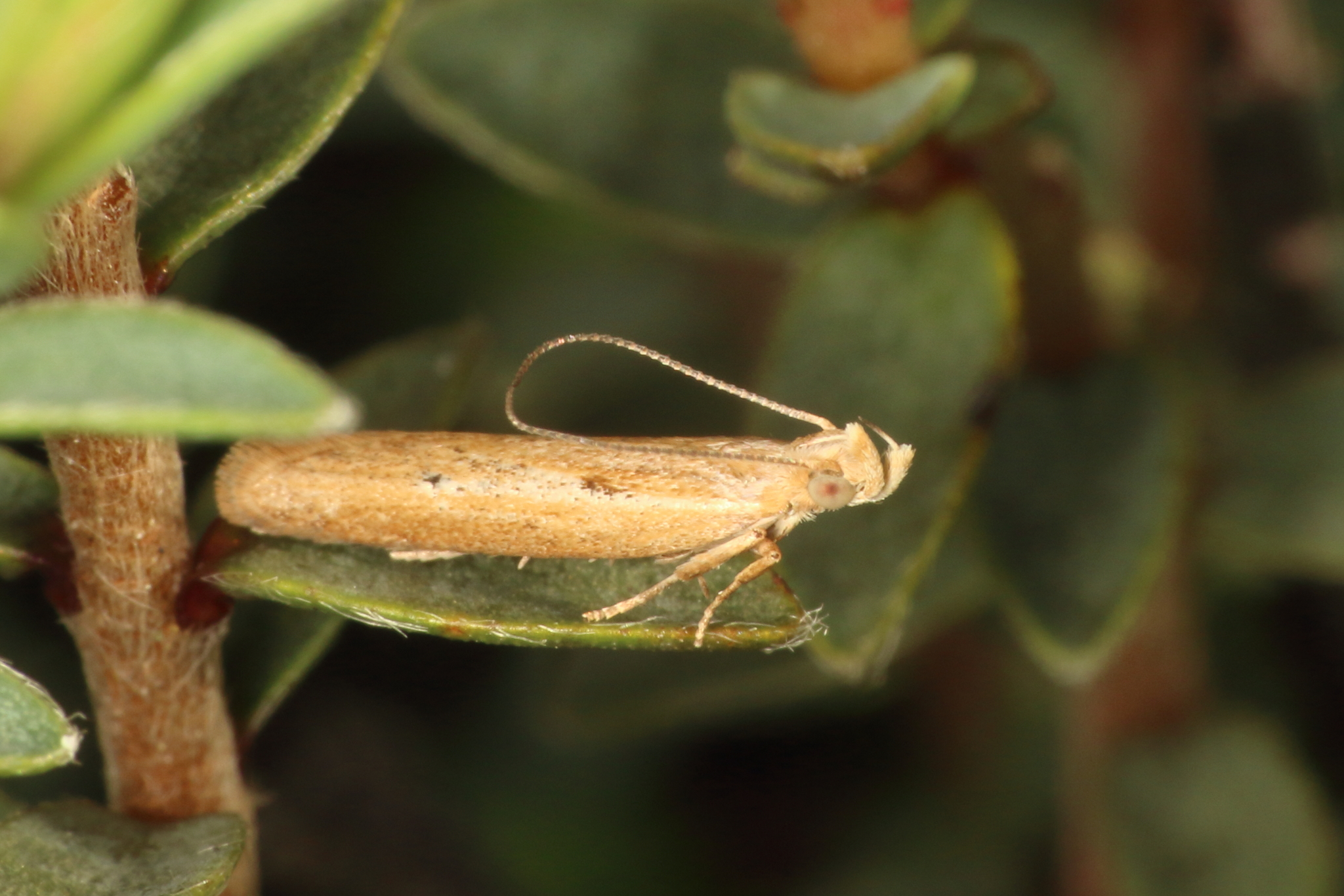

Scientific classification
- Kingdom: Animalia
- Phylum: Arthropoda
- Class: Insecta
- Order: Lepidoptera
- Family: Depressariidae
- Genus: Eutorna
- Species: E. inornata

Binomial name
- Eutorna inornata Philpott, 1927

= Eutorna inornata =

Species of moth

Eutorna inornata is a moth in the family Depressariidae. It was described by Alfred Philpott in 1927. It is endemic to New Zealand and has been observed in both the North and South Islands. The larvae of this moth are leaf miners of Selliera radicans.

== Taxonomy ==
This species was described by Alfred Philpott in 1927 using specimens collected by himself at Seaward Moss in Invercargill in January as well as specimens collected by Mr Heighway and Mr Lindsay at Bottle Lake and Waikuku in Canterbury in November and March. The male holotype specimen, collected by Philpott at Seaward Moss, is held at the New Zealand Arthropod Collection.

== Description ==
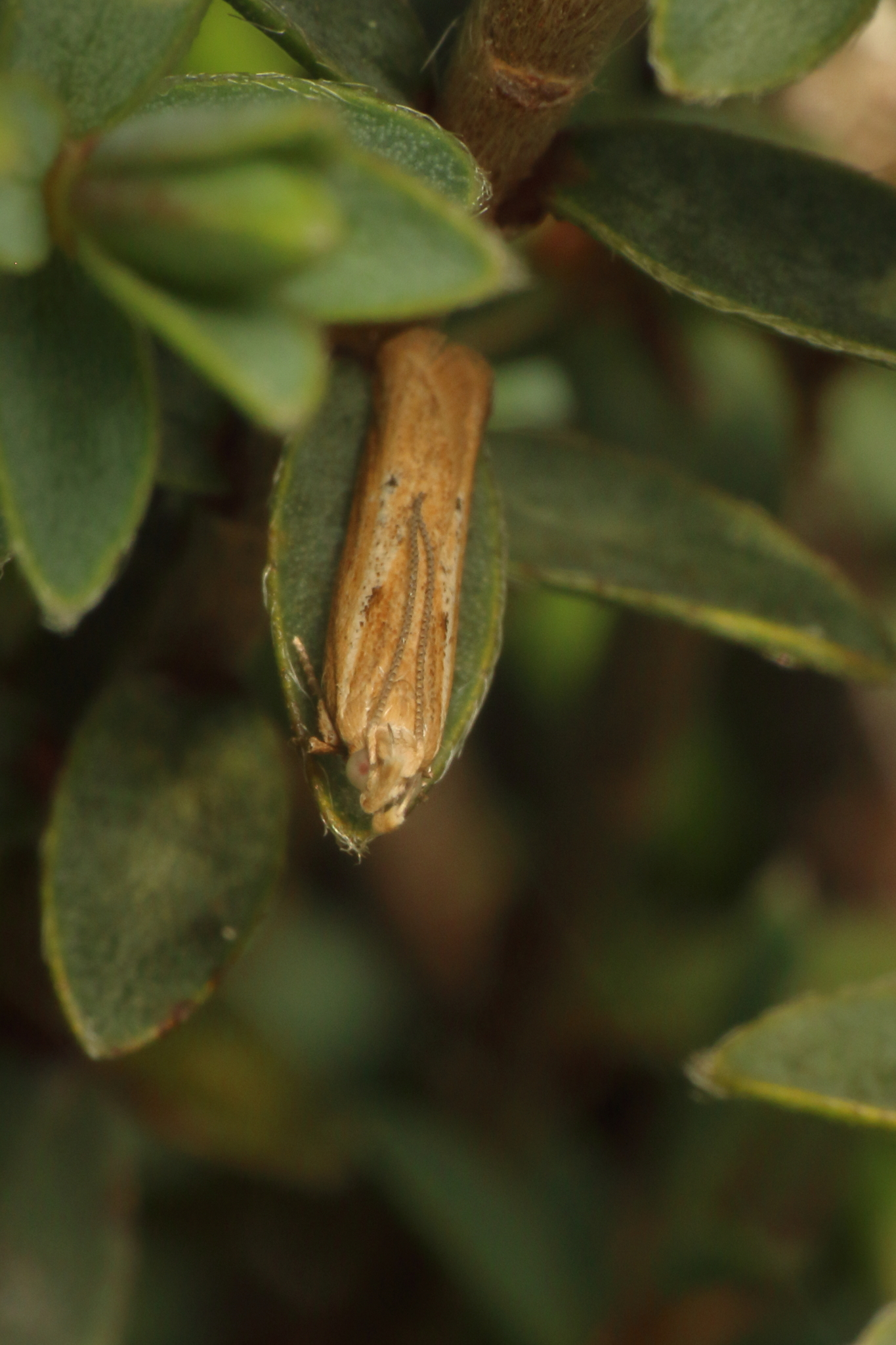

Philpott described the species as follows:

♂ ♀. 12–14 mm. Head ochreous-whitish. Palpi ochreouswhitish, apex of terminal segment brown. Antennae fuscous, annulated with ochreous, basally ochreous. Thorax pale ochreous. Abdomen ochreous-whitish. Legs ochreous-whitish, anterior pair infuscated. Forewings with the branches of the first cubitus shortstalked, costa moderately arched, apex pointed, termen oblique; ochreous mixed with white; a blackish–fuscous spot, usually elongate, at about ⅓; a black dot in disc at ⅔; fringes ochreous. Hindwings greyish-fuscous; fringes ochreous.

== Distribution ==
This species is endemic to New Zealand and has been observed in the North and South Islands.

== Habitat ==
This species can be found in coastal habitats but has also been observed in native forest habitats.

== Host species ==
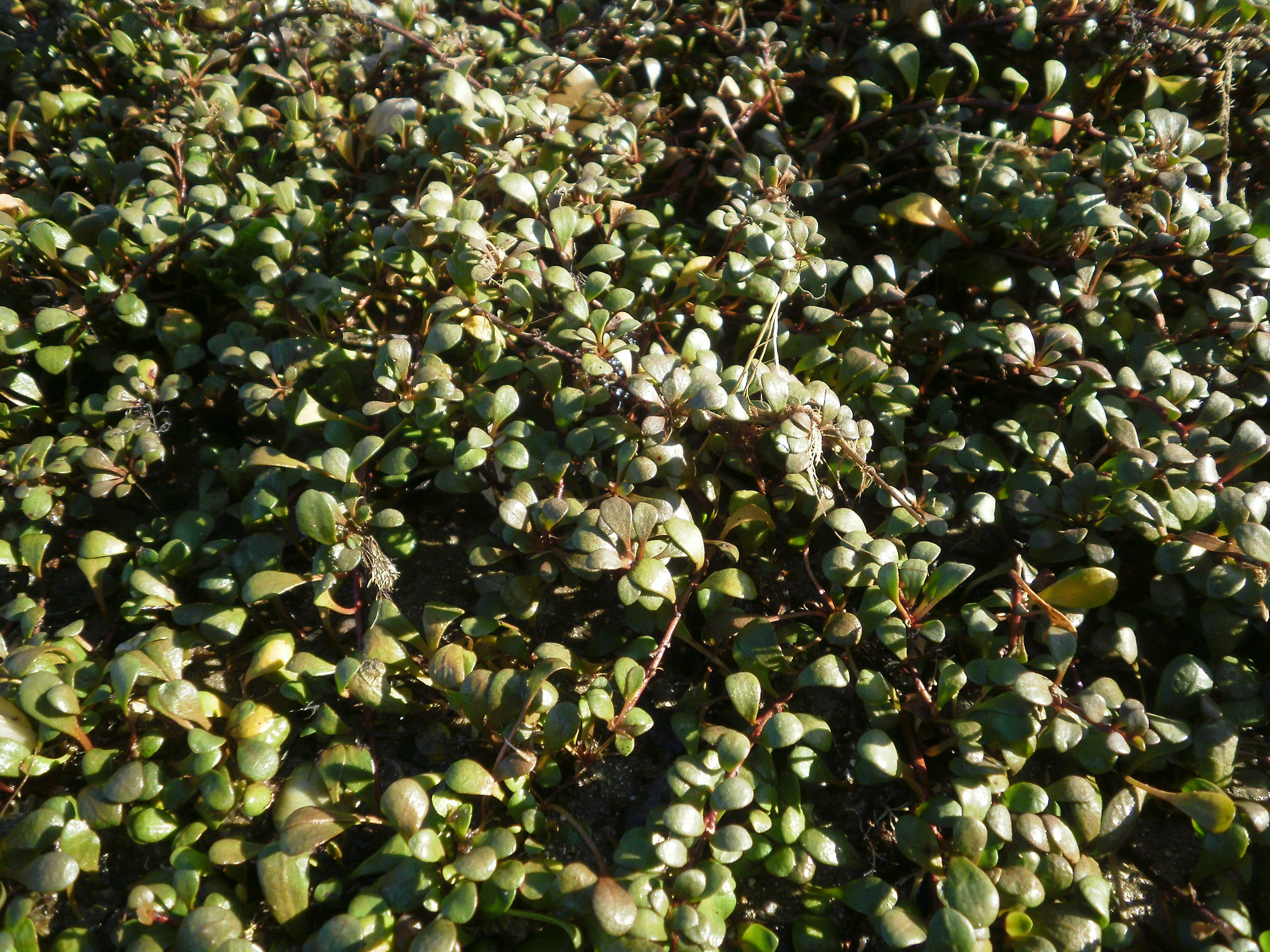
Selliera radicans, host species of E. inornata.

The larvae of this moth are leaf miners of Selliera radicans, a plant that can be found in coastal to alpine habitats.
