= Peritornenta =

Scientific classification
- Domain: Eukaryota
- Kingdom: Animalia
- Phylum: Arthropoda
- Class: Insecta
- Order: Lepidoptera
- Family: Depressariidae
- Subfamily: Depressariinae
- Genus: Peritornenta; Turner, 1900

Synonyms
- Peritorneuta Meyrick, 1902

Genus of moths

Peritornenta is a moth genus of the family Depressariidae.

== Species ==
- Peritornenta bacchata (Meyrick, 1914)
- Peritornenta circulatella (Walker, 1864)
- Peritornenta gennaea (Meyrick, 1923)
- Peritornenta lissopis (Turner, 1947)
- Peritornenta minans (Meyrick, 1921)
- Peritornenta rhodophanes (Meyrick, 1902)
- Peritornenta spilanthes (Meyrick, 1933)
- Peritornenta stigmatias Turner, 1900
- Peritornenta thyellia (Meyrick, 1902)
