= Haereta =

Scientific classification
- Domain: Eukaryota
- Kingdom: Animalia
- Phylum: Arthropoda
- Class: Insecta
- Order: Lepidoptera
- Family: Depressariidae
- Subfamily: Depressariinae
- Genus: Haereta; Turner, 1947

Genus of moths

Haereta is a moth genus of the family Depressariidae.

== Species ==
- Haereta cryphimaea Turner, 1947
- Haereta niphosceles Turner, 1947
