= Eutorna annosa =

Scientific classification
- Kingdom: Animalia
- Phylum: Arthropoda
- Class: Insecta
- Order: Lepidoptera
- Family: Depressariidae
- Genus: Eutorna
- Species: E. annosa

Binomial name
- Eutorna annosa Meyrick, 1936

Species of moth

Eutorna annosa is a moth in the family Depressariidae. It was described by Edward Meyrick in 1936. It is found in China.
