= Notosara =

Scientific classification
- Domain: Eukaryota
- Kingdom: Animalia
- Phylum: Arthropoda
- Class: Insecta
- Order: Lepidoptera
- Family: Depressariidae
- Subfamily: Depressariinae
- Genus: Notosara; Meyrick, 1890

Synonyms
- Philetes Turner, 1939

Genus of moths

Notosara is a moth genus of the family Depressariidae.

== Species ==
- Notosara acosmeta (Common, 1964)
- Notosara nephelotis Meyrick, 1890
