= Peritornenta spilanthes =

Scientific classification
- Kingdom: Animalia
- Phylum: Arthropoda
- Class: Insecta
- Order: Lepidoptera
- Family: Depressariidae
- Genus: Peritornenta
- Species: P. spilanthes

Binomial name
- Peritornenta spilanthes (Meyrick, 1933)

Synonyms
- Peritorneuta spilanthes Meyrick, 1933

Species of moth

Peritornenta spilanthes is a moth in the family Depressariidae. It was described by Edward Meyrick in 1933. It is found in Fiji.
