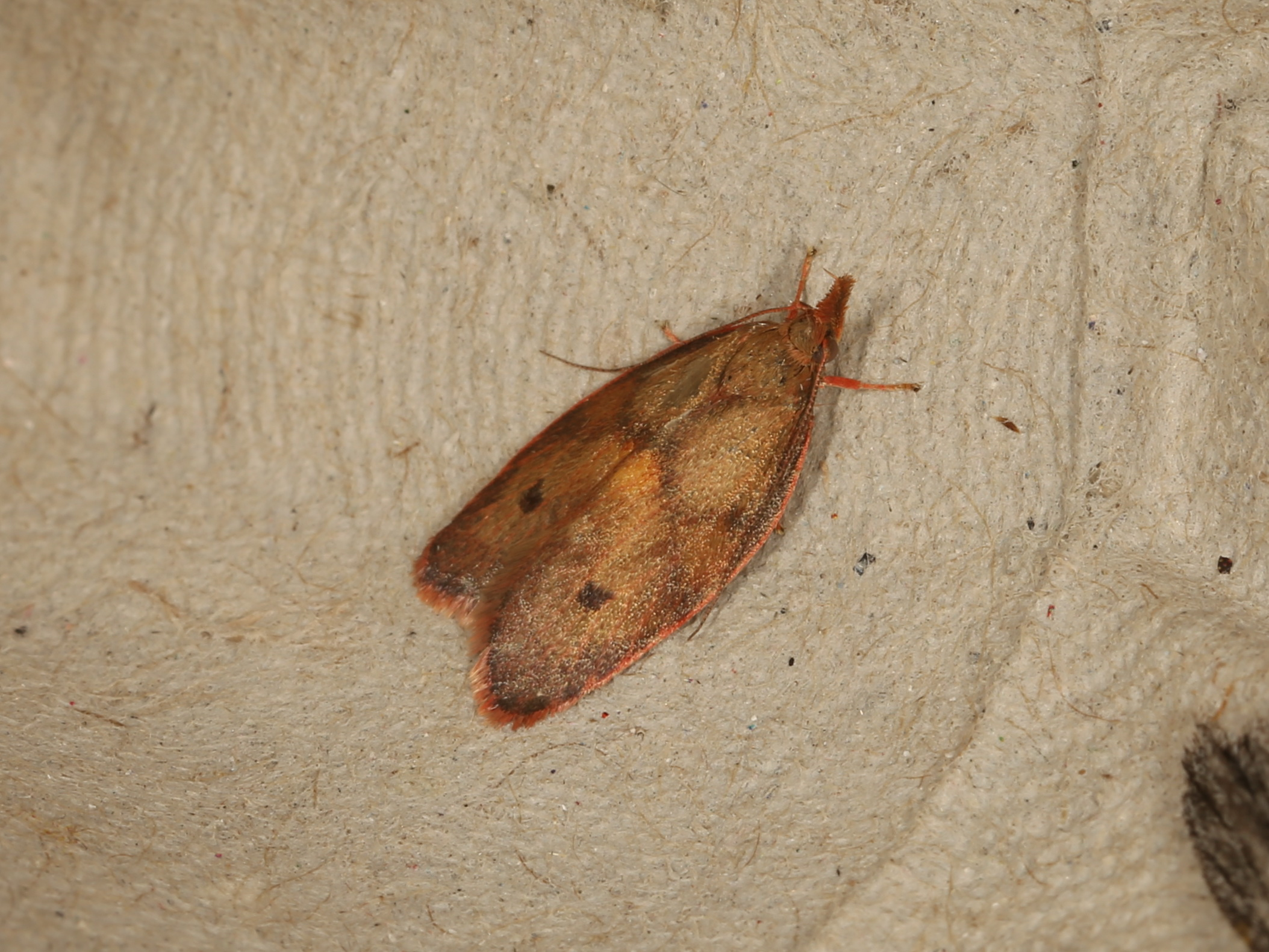
- Enchocrates sp.

Scientific classification
- Kingdom: Animalia
- Phylum: Arthropoda
- Class: Insecta
- Order: Lepidoptera
- Family: Depressariidae
- Subfamily: Depressariinae
- Genus: Enchocrates; Meyrick, 1883

Species
- See text

= Enchocrates =

Genus of moths

Enchocrates is a genus of moths of the family Oecophoridae.

== Species ==
- Enchocrates glaucopis Meyrick, 1883
- Enchocrates habroschema (Turner, 1946)
- Enchocrates phaedryntis Meyrick, 1888
- Enchocrates picrophylla Meyrick, 1886
- Enchocrates vesperascens Meyrick, 1921
