= Eutorna polismatica =

Scientific classification
- Kingdom: Animalia
- Phylum: Arthropoda
- Class: Insecta
- Order: Lepidoptera
- Family: Depressariidae
- Genus: Eutorna
- Species: E. polismatica

Binomial name
- Eutorna polismatica Meyrick, 1931

Species of moth

Eutorna polismatica is a moth in the family Depressariidae. It was described by Edward Meyrick in 1931. It is found in Japan.
