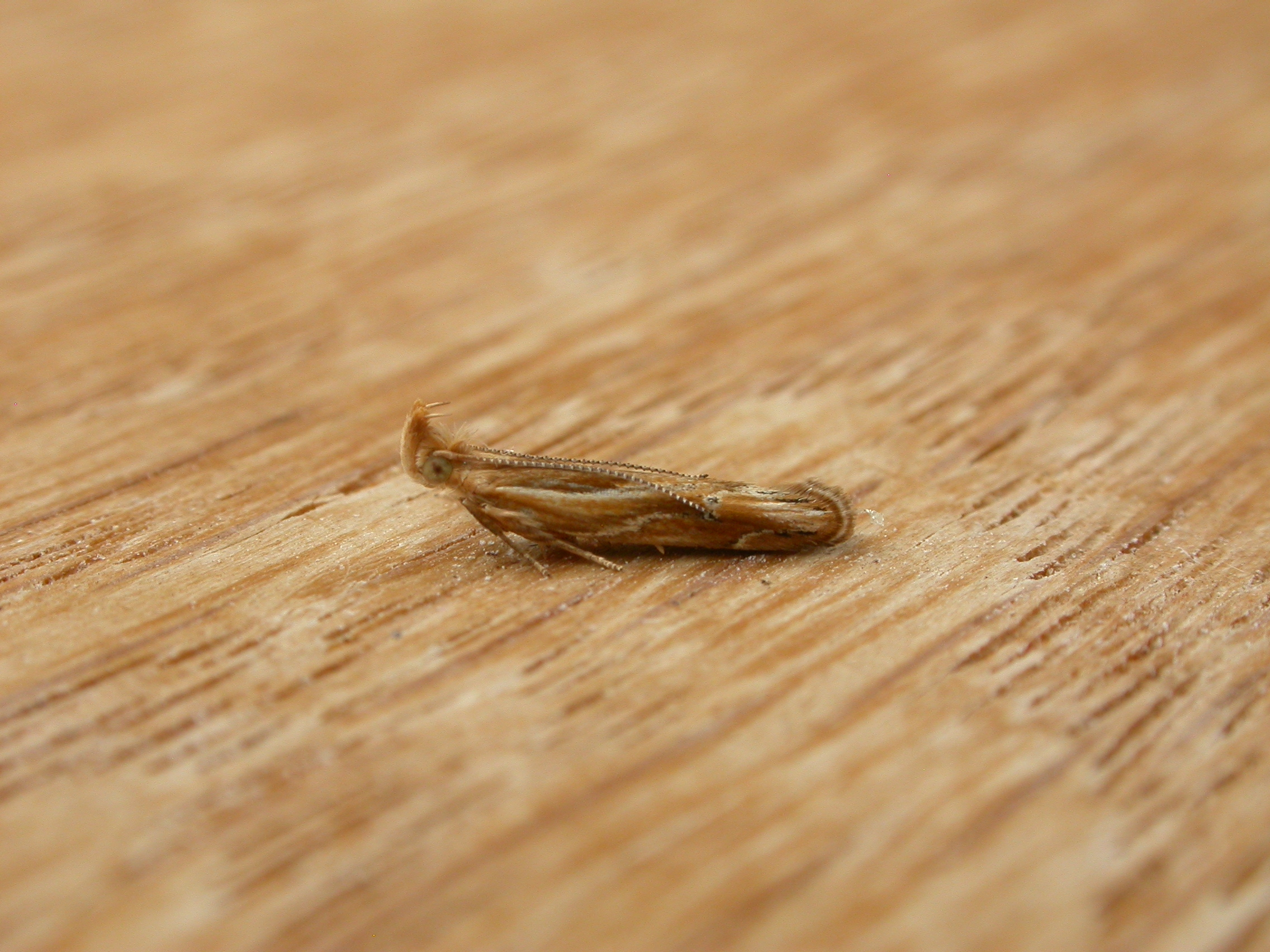
- Eutorna tricasis

Scientific classification
- Kingdom: Animalia
- Phylum: Arthropoda
- Clade: Pancrustacea
- Class: Insecta
- Order: Lepidoptera
- Family: Depressariidae
- Subfamily: Depressariinae
- Genus: Eutorna; Meyrick, 1889

Type species
- Eutorna caryochroa Meyrick, 1889

Synonyms
- Heterozancla Turner, 1919

= Eutorna =

Genus of moths

Eutorna is a genus of gelechioid moths.

== Species ==
- Eutorna annosa Meyrick, 1936 (from China)
- Eutorna caryochroa Meyrick, 1889 (from New Zealand)
- Eutorna diaula Meyrick, 1906 (from Australia)
- Eutorna diluvialis Meyrick, 1913 (from Congo, Madagascar and South Africa)
- Eutorna epicnephes Meyrick, 1906 (from Australia)
- Eutorna eurygramma Meyrick, 1906 (from Australia)
- Eutorna generalis Meyrick, 1921 (from Australia and Java)
- Eutorna inornata Philpott, 1927 (from New Zealand)
- Eutorna insidiosa Meyrick, 1910 (from India & Japan)
- Eutorna intonsa Meyrick, 1906 (from Australia)
- Eutorna leonidi Lvovsky, 1979 (from Japan and Siberia)
- Eutorna leptographa Meyrick, 1906 (from Australia)
- Eutorna pabulicola Meyrick, 1906 (from Australia)
- Eutorna phaulocosma Meyrick, 1906 (from Australia and New Zealand)
- Eutorna plumbeola Turner, 1947 (from Australia)
- Eutorna polismatica Meyrick, 1931 (from Japan)
- Eutorna punctinigrella Viette, 1955 (from Madagascar)
- Eutorna rubida (Turner, 1919) (from Australia)
- Eutorna spintherias Meyrick, 1906 (from Australia)
- Eutorna symmorpha Meyrick, 1889 (from New Zealand)
- Eutorna tricasis Meyrick, 1906 (from Australia)
