= Heterobathra votiva =

Scientific classification
- Kingdom: Animalia
- Phylum: Arthropoda
- Class: Insecta
- Order: Lepidoptera
- Family: Depressariidae
- Genus: Heterobathra
- Species: H. votiva

Binomial name
- Heterobathra votiva Meyrick, 1922

Species of moth

Heterobathra votiva is a moth in the family Depressariidae. It was described by Edward Meyrick in 1922. It is found in Palestine.

The wingspan is about 14 mm. The forewings are grey finely and closely irrorated white and with some darker grey suffusion towards the costa before and beyond the bend. The stigmata are blackish grey surrounded with whitish suffusion, the plical beneath the first discal. There are slight indistinct marginal dots of blackish-grey speckling around the posterior part of the costa and termen. The hindwings are light grey.
