= Barantola =

Scientific classification
- Kingdom: Animalia
- Phylum: Arthropoda
- Class: Insecta
- Order: Lepidoptera
- Family: Depressariidae
- Subfamily: Depressariinae
- Genus: Barantola; Walker, 1864

Synonyms
- Magostolis Meyrick, 1887; Periclita Turner, 1917

Genus of moths

Barantola is a moth genus of the family Depressariidae.

== Species ==
- Barantola panarista (Turner, 1917)
- Barantola pulcherrima Walker, 1864
