= Ectaga lictor =

Scientific classification
- Domain: Eukaryota
- Kingdom: Animalia
- Phylum: Arthropoda
- Class: Insecta
- Order: Lepidoptera
- Family: Depressariidae
- Genus: Ectaga
- Species: E. lictor

Binomial name
- Ectaga lictor Walsingham, 1912

Species of moth

Ectaga lictor is a moth in the family Depressariidae. It was described by Thomas de Grey, 6th Baron Walsingham, in 1912. It is found in Guatemala.

The wingspan is about 18 mm. The forewings are hoary greyish, with an obliquely placed streak of raised blackish scales at about one-fourth the wing-length, running from the upper edge of the cell to about the middle of the fold. There is a blackish dot at the end of the cell and a slight sprinkling of brownish scales at about the middle of the dorsum and in the direction of the apex there is a strong shade of the same colour, accompanied with greyish fuscous, occupying the costa from above the black streak to the apex. The hindwings are shining whitish cinereous.
