= Gymnoceros pallidula =

Scientific classification
- Kingdom: Animalia
- Phylum: Arthropoda
- Class: Insecta
- Order: Lepidoptera
- Family: Depressariidae
- Genus: Gymnoceros
- Species: G. pallidula

Binomial name
- Gymnoceros pallidula Turner, 1946

Species of moth

Gymnoceros pallidula is a moth in the family Depressariidae. It was described by Alfred Jefferis Turner in 1946. It is found in Australia, where it has been recorded from Queensland.

The wingspan is 28–30 mm.
