= Haereta cryphimaea =

Scientific classification
- Domain: Eukaryota
- Kingdom: Animalia
- Phylum: Arthropoda
- Class: Insecta
- Order: Lepidoptera
- Family: Depressariidae
- Genus: Haereta
- Species: H. cryphimaea

Binomial name
- Haereta cryphimaea Turner, 1947

Species of moth

Haereta cryphimaea is a moth in the family Depressariidae. It was described by Alfred Jefferis Turner in 1947. It is found in Australia, where it has been recorded from Queensland.
