= Peritornenta bacchata =

Scientific classification
- Kingdom: Animalia
- Phylum: Arthropoda
- Class: Insecta
- Order: Lepidoptera
- Family: Depressariidae
- Genus: Peritornenta
- Species: P. bacchata

Binomial name
- Peritornenta bacchata (Meyrick, 1914)

Synonyms
- Peritorneuta bacchata Meyrick, 1914

Species of moth

Peritornenta bacchata is a moth in the family Depressariidae. It was described by Edward Meyrick in 1914. It is found in Australia, where it has been recorded from Queensland and New South Wales.

The wingspan is 19–22 mm. The forewings are greyish ochreous, with rows of obscure dark fuscous dots on the veins and with the costal edge on the anterior half and three costal dots posteriorly bright rosy crimson. There is an undefined oblique median fascia of grey suffusion, and a transverse patch from the costa at three-fourths, as well as an undefined patch of light crimson-reddish suffusion in the disc beyond the cell. The hindwings are dark grey.
