= Eutorna plumbeola =

Scientific classification
- Domain: Eukaryota
- Kingdom: Animalia
- Phylum: Arthropoda
- Class: Insecta
- Order: Lepidoptera
- Family: Depressariidae
- Genus: Eutorna
- Species: E. plumbeola

Binomial name
- Eutorna plumbeola Turner, 1947

Species of moth

Eutorna plumbeola is a moth in the family Depressariidae. It was described by Alfred Jefferis Turner in 1947. It is found in Western Australia.
