= Scorpiopsis pyrobola =

Scientific classification
- Domain: Eukaryota
- Kingdom: Animalia
- Phylum: Arthropoda
- Class: Insecta
- Order: Lepidoptera
- Family: Depressariidae
- Genus: Scorpiopsis
- Species: S. pyrobola

Binomial name
- Scorpiopsis pyrobola (Meyrick, 1887)

Synonyms
- Gonionota pyrobola Meyrick, 1887; Scorpiopsis superba Turner, 1894

Species of moth

Scorpiopsis pyrobola is a moth in the family Depressariidae. It was described by Edward Meyrick in 1887. It is found in Australia, where it has been recorded from Queensland and New South Wales.

The wingspan is 24–27 mm. The forewings are red, sometimes posteriorly sprinkled with yellow whitish between the veins. All veins and folds are marked with series of evenly arranged round yellow dots and there is a narrow fuscous suffusion along the costa from the base to two-thirds, as well as a suffused fuscous band from the middle of the submedian fold to the costa at two-thirds, sending streaks posteriorly along the veins. About seven irregularly arranged small round silvery-white spots are found towards the base of the wing and anterior half of the costa and there is a small transverse-oval silvery-white spot in the disc at two-thirds, a smaller round spot above it, and three silvery-white dots on the veins beyond them. There is also a dark fuscous hindmarginal line. The hindwings are very pale whitish yellowish.
