= Eutorna pabulicola =

Scientific classification
- Kingdom: Animalia
- Phylum: Arthropoda
- Class: Insecta
- Order: Lepidoptera
- Family: Depressariidae
- Genus: Eutorna
- Species: E. pabulicola

Binomial name
- Eutorna pabulicola Meyrick, 1906

Synonyms
- Eutorna pabulicola Lower, 1897

Species of moth

Eutorna pabulicola is a moth in the family Depressariidae. It was described by Edward Meyrick in 1906. It is found in Australia, where it has been recorded from Queensland and New South Wales.

The wingspan is 13–15 mm. The forewings are light brownish ochreous, more or less sprinkled with fuscous or dark fuscous, the veins more or less streaked with white, especially posteriorly. There is a fine undefined line of blackish scales on the submedian fold from the base to about the middle, including a well-marked black plical stigma and oblique lines of blackish scales from the costa at one-third and before three-fourths, not reaching the middle, sometimes hardly traceable. The second discal stigma is black edged with white and there are some suffused black marks on the apical portion of the costa and termen except at the apex. The hindwings are pale grey.
