= Notosara nephelotis =

Scientific classification
- Domain: Eukaryota
- Kingdom: Animalia
- Phylum: Arthropoda
- Class: Insecta
- Order: Lepidoptera
- Family: Depressariidae
- Genus: Notosara
- Species: N. nephelotis

Binomial name
- Notosara nephelotis Meyrick, 1890

Synonyms
- Philetes megalospila Turner, 1939

Species of moth

Notosara nephelotis is a moth in the family Depressariidae. It was described by Edward Meyrick in 1890. It is found in Australia, where it has been recorded from Western Australia.

The wingspan is 24–28 mm. The forewings are brownish-grey, sprinkled with whitish and the veins marked with partially interrupted fine black lines. There is an indistinct cloudy whitish suffusion forming an undefined patch towards the base, a spot in the middle of the disc followed by a roundish darker grey spot margined with black beneath, and an irregular outwards-curved fascia from three-fourths of the costa to the inner margin before the anal angle, indented towards near both extremities. The hindwings are fuscous, lighter towards the base and the hindmargin is darker.
