= Pedois lutea =

Scientific classification
- Domain: Eukaryota
- Kingdom: Animalia
- Phylum: Arthropoda
- Class: Insecta
- Order: Lepidoptera
- Family: Depressariidae
- Genus: Pedois
- Species: P. lutea

Binomial name
- Pedois lutea (Turner, 1927)

Synonyms
- Cryptolechia lutea Turner, 1927

Species of moth

Pedois lutea is a moth in the family Depressariidae. It was described by Alfred Jefferis Turner in 1927. It is found in Australia, where it has been recorded from Tasmania.
