= Thalamarchella robinsoni =

Scientific classification
- Kingdom: Animalia
- Phylum: Arthropoda
- Class: Insecta
- Order: Lepidoptera
- Family: Depressariidae
- Genus: Thalamarchella
- Species: T. robinsoni

Binomial name
- Thalamarchella robinsoni Common, 1964

Species of moth

Thalamarchella robinsoni is a moth in the family Depressariidae. It was described by Ian Francis Bell Common in 1964. It is found in Australia, where it has been recorded from Western Australia.
