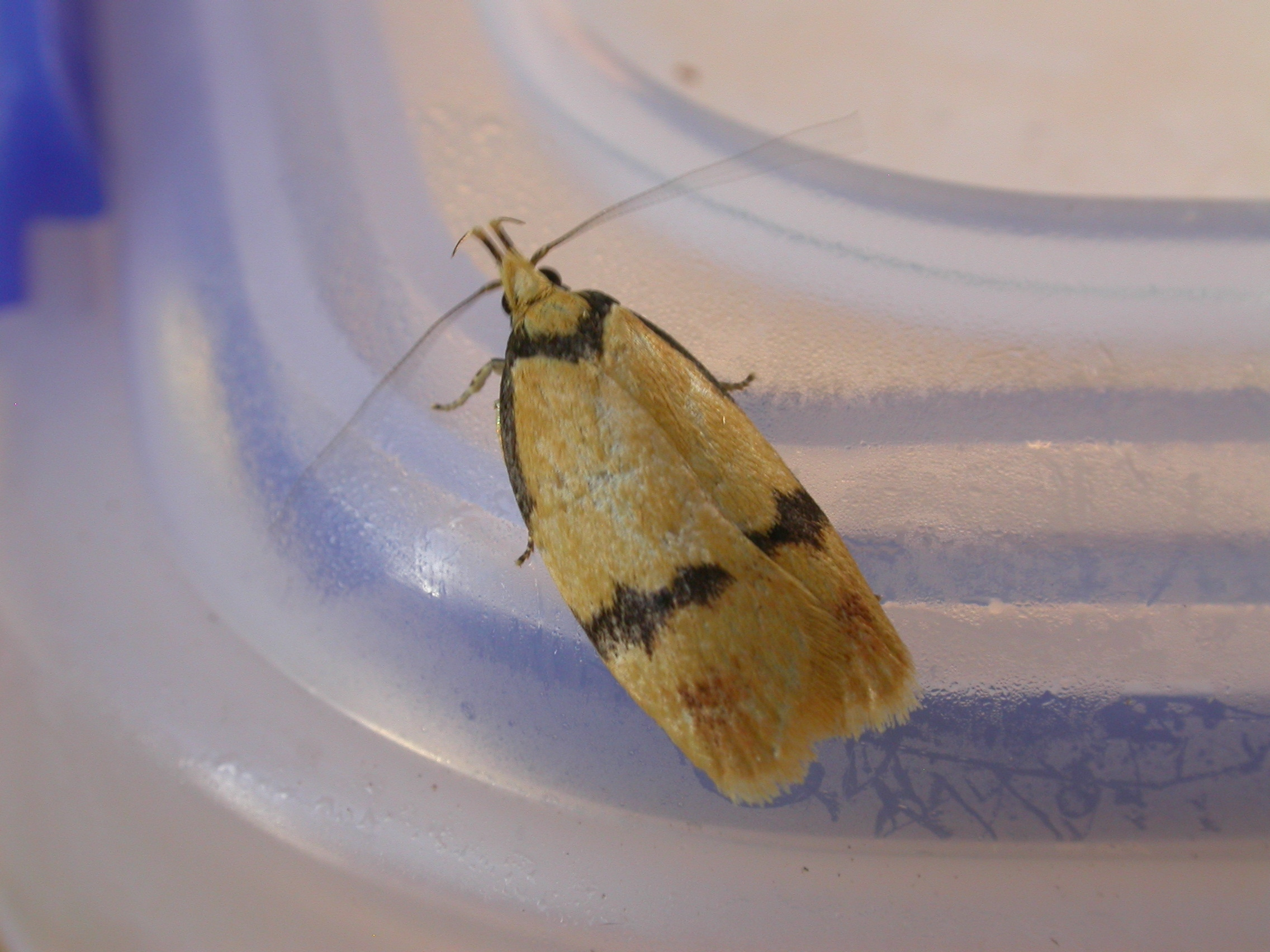

Scientific classification
- Kingdom: Animalia
- Phylum: Arthropoda
- Class: Insecta
- Order: Lepidoptera
- Family: Depressariidae
- Genus: Pedois
- Species: P. humerana

Binomial name
- Pedois humerana (Walker, 1863)

Synonyms
- Conchylis humerana Walker, 1863

= Pedois humerana =

Species of moth

Pedois humerana is a species of moth of the family Depressariidae. It is found in Australia, where it has been recorded from New South Wales and Tasmania.

The forewings are yellow with a jagged black bar across the middle and at the base. The hindwings are plain grey.
