= Barantola pulcherrima =

Scientific classification
- Kingdom: Animalia
- Phylum: Arthropoda
- Class: Insecta
- Order: Lepidoptera
- Family: Depressariidae
- Genus: Barantola
- Species: B. pulcherrima

Binomial name
- Barantola pulcherrima Walker, 1864

Synonyms
- Magostolis uranaula Meyrick, 1887

Species of moth

Barantola pulcherrima is a moth in the family Depressariidae. It was described by Francis Walker in 1864. It is found in New Guinea and Australia, where it has been recorded from Queensland and New South Wales.

The wingspan is about 15 mm. The forewings are rather dark grey and with a red streak along the basal third of the costa, bordered beneath by an ochreous-white streak, of which the posterior extremity forms an oblong spot surrounded by a dark grey line and there is a broad yellow streak, margined beneath with red except on the fascia, along the middle third of the costa, the apex suddenly pointed. There is a rather narrow silvery-white direct fascia somewhat before the middle, terminated above by yellow streak, margined anteriorly with red, posteriorly with dark grey and then more broadly with red. There is a rather narrow silvery-white fascia, margined with red all around, from beneath the costa at two-thirds along the costa to the apex, then along the hindmargin to the anal angle. The hindwings are white.
