= Peritornenta circulatella =

Scientific classification
- Kingdom: Animalia
- Phylum: Arthropoda
- Class: Insecta
- Order: Lepidoptera
- Family: Depressariidae
- Genus: Peritornenta
- Species: P. circulatella

Binomial name
- Peritornenta circulatella (Walker, 1864)

Synonyms
- Cryptolechia circulatella Walker, 1864

Species of moth

Peritornenta circulatella is a moth in the family Depressariidae. It was described by Francis Walker in 1864. It is found in Australia, where it has been recorded from the Northern Territory, Queensland and New South Wales.

The wingspan is 19–21 mm. The forewings are light reddish ochreous, sometimes rosy tinged, with numerous transverse dark ferruginous-brown strigae more or less broken up into series of dots. The costal edge is pale rosy and there is a broad streak of grey-whitish suffusion along the anterior half of the costa, posteriorly irregularly extended into the disc. There is an indistinct grey-whitish suffusion on the costa beyond the middle and a narrow grey-whitish terminal streak. The hindwings are ochreous yellow, towards the apex darker and sometimes rosy tinged.

The larvae feed on Sapindaceae species, including Cupaniopsis anacardioides in coastal areas and Atalaya hemiclauca in arid areas.
