= Heterobathra xiphosema =

Scientific classification
- Kingdom: Animalia
- Phylum: Arthropoda
- Class: Insecta
- Order: Lepidoptera
- Family: Depressariidae
- Genus: Heterobathra
- Species: H. xiphosema

Binomial name
- Heterobathra xiphosema Lower, 1901

Species of moth

Heterobathra xiphosema is a moth in the family Depressariidae. It was described by Oswald Bertram Lower in 1901. It is found in Australia, where it has been recorded from New South Wales.

The wingspan is about 22 mm. The forewings are ashy-grey whitish with a slightly curved moderate black longitudinal streak above the middle, from the base of the costa to just above the apex of the wing, thickest on the basal third. There is a black spot at one-third from the base and a second, similar one at the end of the cell, both touching the longitudinal streak. The hindwings are grey whitish.
