= Pedois epinephela =

Scientific classification
- Domain: Eukaryota
- Kingdom: Animalia
- Phylum: Arthropoda
- Class: Insecta
- Order: Lepidoptera
- Family: Depressariidae
- Genus: Pedois
- Species: P. epinephela

Binomial name
- Pedois epinephela (Turner, 1947)

Synonyms
- Cryptolechia epinephela Turner, 1947

Species of moth

Pedois epinephela is a moth in the family Depressariidae. It was described by Alfred Jefferis Turner in 1947. It is found in Australia, where it has been recorded from Queensland.

The wingspan is 22–24 mm. The forewings are pale grey with a large ill-defined grey blotch on the tornal area from the base to the middle. The stigmata are grey, the first discal at one-third, the plical beneath it, the second discal before two-thirds. There is a subcostal line of grey dots from the middle, continued as subterminal line of dots and there is a terminal series of dots. The hindwings are grey whitish.
