= Peritornenta minans =

Scientific classification
- Kingdom: Animalia
- Phylum: Arthropoda
- Class: Insecta
- Order: Lepidoptera
- Family: Depressariidae
- Genus: Peritornenta
- Species: P. minans

Binomial name
- Peritornenta minans (Meyrick, 1921)

Synonyms
- Peritorneuta minans Meyrick, 1921

Species of moth

Peritornenta minans is a moth in the family Depressariidae. It was described by Edward Meyrick in 1921. It is found in Australia, where it has been recorded from Queensland.

The wingspan is about 21 mm. The forewings are pale pinkish ochreous, with a violet gloss and three series of small dark fuscous dots on the veins posteriorly. The hindwings are pale ochreous, faintly pinkish tinged.
