= Pedois rhodomita =

Scientific classification
- Domain: Eukaryota
- Kingdom: Animalia
- Phylum: Arthropoda
- Class: Insecta
- Order: Lepidoptera
- Family: Depressariidae
- Genus: Pedois
- Species: P. rhodomita

Binomial name
- Pedois rhodomita Turner, 1900

Species of moth

Pedois rhodomita is a moth in the family Depressariidae. It was described by Alfred Jefferis Turner in 1900. It is found in Australia, where it has been recorded from Queensland.

The wingspan is about 19 mm. The forewings are whitish, irrorated with reddish scales, which form numerous confused longitudinal streaks, a reddish-fuscous dot in the disc before the middle, a second beyond the middle, and a third on the fold beneath the first. There is a series of reddish-fuscous dots on the apical third of the costa and hindmargin. The hindwings are grey.
