= Pedois anthracias =

Scientific classification
- Kingdom: Animalia
- Phylum: Arthropoda
- Class: Insecta
- Order: Lepidoptera
- Family: Depressariidae
- Genus: Pedois
- Species: P. anthracias

Binomial name
- Pedois anthracias Lower, 1902

Species of moth

Pedois anthracias is a moth in the family Depressariidae. It was described by Oswald Bertram Lower in 1902. It is found in Australia, where it has been recorded from Victoria.

The wingspan is about 20 mm. The forewings are blackish and all veins are obscurely outlined with black and the extreme costal edge is fleshy ochreous. The hindwings are greyish, faintly fuscous tinged.
