= Barantola panarista =

Scientific classification
- Domain: Eukaryota
- Kingdom: Animalia
- Phylum: Arthropoda
- Class: Insecta
- Order: Lepidoptera
- Family: Depressariidae
- Genus: Barantola
- Species: B. panarista

Binomial name
- Barantola panarista (Turner, 1917)

Synonyms
- Periclita panarista Turner, 1917

Species of moth

Barantola panarista is a moth in the family Depressariidae. It was described by Alfred Jefferis Turner in 1917. It is found in Australia, where it has been recorded from Queensland and New South Wales.

The wingspan is about 25 mm. The forewings are shining snow-white with a costal streak from the base to the apex, orange-ochreous, but crimson near the base, and shortly crimson-tinged at four-fifths. There is a dark-fuscous line limiting costal streak from one-fifth to four-fifths and a transverse bar from one-fourth of the costal streak, crimson-ochreous coarsely outlined with dark-fuscous, nearly reaching one-fourth of the dorsum, and connected with it by a crimson-ochreous dot containing some fuscous scales. A similar much shorter bar is found from beyond the middle, not reaching the middle of the disc and there is a dark-fuscous line edged with crimson around the apex and termen. The hindwings are white with a small grey suffusion at the apex.
