= Peritornenta thyellia =

Scientific classification
- Kingdom: Animalia
- Phylum: Arthropoda
- Class: Insecta
- Order: Lepidoptera
- Family: Depressariidae
- Genus: Peritornenta
- Species: P. thyellia

Binomial name
- Peritornenta thyellia (Meyrick, 1902)

Synonyms
- Peritorneuta thyellia Meyrick, 1902

Species of moth

Peritornenta thyellia is a moth in the family Depressariidae. It was described by Edward Meyrick in 1902. It is found in Australia, where it has been recorded from Queensland and New South Wales.

The wingspan is 16–18 mm. The forewings are pale flesh color with numerous more or less distinct dark fuscous dots, arranged in irregular transverse series. There is an indistinct pre-tornal spot of grey suffusion. The hindwings are whitish ochreous or pale yellowish, generally more or less fuscous tinged.
