= Pedois cosmopoda =

Scientific classification
- Domain: Eukaryota
- Kingdom: Animalia
- Phylum: Arthropoda
- Class: Insecta
- Order: Lepidoptera
- Family: Depressariidae
- Genus: Pedois
- Species: P. cosmopoda

Binomial name
- Pedois cosmopoda Turner, 1900

Species of moth

Pedois cosmopoda is a moth in the family Depressariidae. It was described by Alfred Jefferis Turner in 1900. It is found in Australia, where it has been recorded from Queensland and New South Wales.

The wingspan is 16–18 mm. The forewings are whitish grey irrorated with dark fuscous and with the costal edge pink from the base to the apex. The irroration is particularly dense along the inner-marginal portion of the disc, and in the posterior portion of the disc it shows a tendency to form short streaks parallel to the veins. The hindwings are grey, paler towards the base.
