= Haereta niphosceles =

Scientific classification
- Kingdom: Animalia
- Phylum: Arthropoda
- Clade: Pancrustacea
- Class: Insecta
- Order: Lepidoptera
- Family: Depressariidae
- Genus: Haereta
- Species: H. niphosceles

Binomial name
- Haereta niphosceles Turner, 1947

Species of moth

Haereta niphosceles is a moth in the family Depressariidae. It was described by Alfred Jefferis Turner in 1947. It is found in Australia, where it has been recorded from Queensland.
