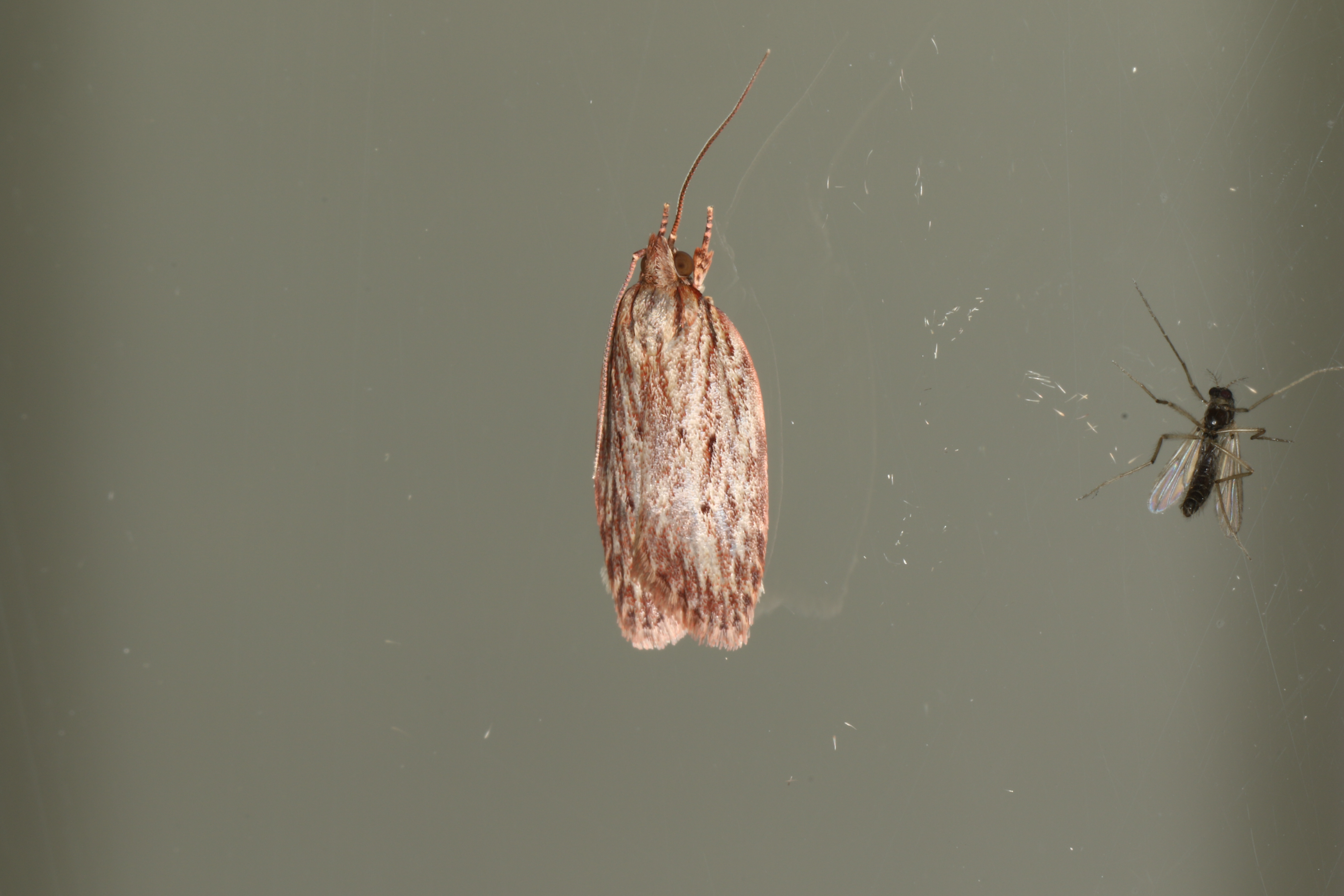

Scientific classification
- Kingdom: Animalia
- Phylum: Arthropoda
- Class: Insecta
- Order: Lepidoptera
- Family: Depressariidae
- Genus: Pedois
- Species: P. ceramora

Binomial name
- Pedois ceramora (Meyrick, 1902)

Synonyms
- Doleromima ceramora Meyrick, 1902

= Pedois ceramora =

Species of moth

Pedois ceramora is a moth in the family Depressariidae. It was described by Edward Meyrick in 1902. It is found in Australia, where it has been recorded from Victoria.

The wingspan is 18–23 mm. The forewings are fuscous, sometimes reddish tinged, sprinkled with dark fuscous. The anterior half is more or less mixed with ochreous whitish. The stigmata are indistinct and dark fuscous, the plical beneath the first discal and there is a thick cloudy dentate angulated ochreous-whitish subterminal line, near and parallel to the posterior half of the costa and termen. There is a terminal series of dark spots. The hindwings are light grey, paler towards the base.
