= Enteremna pallida =

Scientific classification
- Domain: Eukaryota
- Kingdom: Animalia
- Phylum: Arthropoda
- Class: Insecta
- Order: Lepidoptera
- Family: Depressariidae
- Genus: Enteremna
- Species: E. pallida

Binomial name
- Enteremna pallida (Turner, 1939)

Synonyms
- Blacophanes pallida Turner, 1939

Species of moth

Enteremna pallida is a moth in the family Depressariidae. It was described by Alfred Jefferis Turner in 1939. It is found in Australia, where it has been recorded from Western Australia.
