= Scorpiopsis rhodoglauca =

Scientific classification
- Domain: Eukaryota
- Kingdom: Animalia
- Phylum: Arthropoda
- Class: Insecta
- Order: Lepidoptera
- Family: Depressariidae
- Genus: Scorpiopsis
- Species: S. rhodoglauca

Binomial name
- Scorpiopsis rhodoglauca Meyrick, 1930

Species of moth

Scorpiopsis rhodoglauca is a moth in the family Depressariidae. It was described by Edward Meyrick in 1930. It is found in Australia, where it has been recorded from Queensland.

The wingspan is about 23 mm. The forewings are crimson, with numerous small pale yellow spots arranged in series. The costal edge is crimson, beneath this a narrow dark grey streak throughout continued around the termen to the tornus. There is a small dark grey spot on the dorsum at two-fifths, from which some slight grey suffusion runs to the dark grey second discal stigma. There is also a curved fascia of grey suffusion tending to be broken into streaks from two-thirds of the costa to the dorsum before the tornus. The hindwings are whitish, suffused light rosy pink except towards the base, with the basal hairs tinged ochreous.
