= Eutorna eurygramma =

Scientific classification
- Kingdom: Animalia
- Phylum: Arthropoda
- Class: Insecta
- Order: Lepidoptera
- Family: Depressariidae
- Genus: Eutorna
- Species: E. eurygramma

Binomial name
- Eutorna eurygramma Meyrick, 1906

Species of moth

Eutorna eurygramma is a moth in the family Depressariidae. It was described by Edward Meyrick in 1906. It is found in Australia, where it has been recorded from Victoria, New South Wales and Tasmania.

The wingspan is 14–16 mm. The forewings are bright ochreous brown with a median longitudinal white streak from the base to the apex, broadest anteriorly, edged beneath by dark brown or dark fuscous suffusion from near the base to two-thirds, where it is nearly interrupted by a dark fuscous dot from beneath, then dilated into a small transverse spot, between this and an apical spot more or less suffused with ochreous and indistinct. There is a fine white partly black edged sometimes posteriorly incomplete line from two-thirds of the costa beneath the costa to the apex. There is also an undefined suffusion of blackish and white scales on the termen. The hindwings are grey, paler or whitish grey anteriorly.
