= Eutorna diaula =

Scientific classification
- Kingdom: Animalia
- Phylum: Arthropoda
- Class: Insecta
- Order: Lepidoptera
- Family: Depressariidae
- Genus: Eutorna
- Species: E. diaula

Binomial name
- Eutorna diaula Meyrick, 1906

Species of moth

Eutorna diaula is a moth in the family Depressariidae. It was described by Edward Meyrick in 1906. It is found in Australia, where it has been recorded from Victoria and Tasmania.

The wingspan is 13–14 mm. The forewings are ochreous whitish, densely irrorated with brown and dark fuscous except on the veins, which appear as whitish lines. There is a fine line of blackish scales in the submedian fold from the base to the plical stigma. The stigmata are small and blackish, the plical slightly beyond the first discal and there are some black scales towards the apical part of the costa and termen except at the apex. The hindwings are grey, becoming paler towards the base.
