= Thalamarchella alveola =

Scientific classification
- Kingdom: Animalia
- Phylum: Arthropoda
- Class: Insecta
- Order: Lepidoptera
- Family: Depressariidae
- Genus: Thalamarchella
- Species: T. alveola

Binomial name
- Thalamarchella alveola (C. Felder, R. Felder & Rogenhofer, 1875)

Synonyms
- Cryptolechia alveola Felder & Rogenhofer, 1875

Species of moth

Thalamarchella alveola is a moth in the family Depressariidae. It was described by Cajetan Felder, Rudolf Felder and Alois Friedrich Rogenhofer in 1875. It is found in Australia, where it has been recorded from Western Australia.
