= Eutorna leptographa =

Scientific classification
- Kingdom: Animalia
- Phylum: Arthropoda
- Class: Insecta
- Order: Lepidoptera
- Family: Depressariidae
- Genus: Eutorna
- Species: E. leptographa

Binomial name
- Eutorna leptographa Meyrick, 1906

Species of moth

Eutorna leptographa is a moth in the family Depressariidae. It was described by Edward Meyrick in 1906. It is found in Australia, where it has been recorded from Tasmania.

The wingspan is 12–13 mm. The forewings are brownish ochreous irrorated with fuscous, with a few dark fuscous scales and a white median longitudinal streak from the base to the apex, posteriorly sometimes suffused with whitish ochreous, edged beneath by a blackish streak from near the base to and a black dot at two-thirds, and above by a blackish streak from one-third to two-thirds. There is a fine white streak, posteriorly blackish-edged, from one-fourth of the costa to the median streak at two-thirds, produced along the costa towards the base, and an oblique white anteriorly black-edged streak from two-thirds of the costa towards the apex, not reaching the median streak, the costal edge between these suffused with white. The costa and termen towards the apex are suffused with black, except an apical white space. The hindwings are grey, lighter towards the base.
