= Enchocrates habroschema =

Scientific classification
- Domain: Eukaryota
- Kingdom: Animalia
- Phylum: Arthropoda
- Class: Insecta
- Order: Lepidoptera
- Family: Depressariidae
- Genus: Enchocrates
- Species: E. habroschema

Binomial name
- Enchocrates habroschema (Turner, 1946)

Synonyms
- Machimia habroschema Turner, 1946

Species of moth

Enchocrates habroschema is a moth in the family Depressariidae. It was described by Alfred Jefferis Turner in 1946. It is found in Australia, where it has been recorded from South Australia.
