= Peritornenta stigmatias =

Scientific classification
- Domain: Eukaryota
- Kingdom: Animalia
- Phylum: Arthropoda
- Class: Insecta
- Order: Lepidoptera
- Family: Depressariidae
- Genus: Peritornenta
- Species: P. stigmatias

Binomial name
- Peritornenta stigmatias Turner, 1900

Species of moth

Peritornenta stigmatias is a moth in the family Depressariidae. It was described by Alfred Jefferis Turner in 1900. It is found in Australia, where it has been recorded from Queensland.

The wingspan is 17–19 mm. The forewings are pale fuscous, with numerous dark-fuscous dots arranged in rows on the veins and a line of dots from the base to the costa beyond the middle. A second row is found from the base to the inner margin beyond the middle and there are eight rows in the posterior portion of the disc. The hindwings are grey, towards the base whitish.
