= Pedois haploceros =

Scientific classification
- Domain: Eukaryota
- Kingdom: Animalia
- Phylum: Arthropoda
- Class: Insecta
- Order: Lepidoptera
- Family: Depressariidae
- Genus: Pedois
- Species: P. haploceros

Binomial name
- Pedois haploceros (Turner, 1946)

Synonyms
- Machimia haploceros Turner, 1946

Species of moth

Pedois haploceros is a moth in the family Depressariidae. It was described by Alfred Jefferis Turner in 1946. It is found in Australia, where it has been recorded from Queensland.
