= Enteremna dolerastis =

Scientific classification
- Kingdom: Animalia
- Phylum: Arthropoda
- Class: Insecta
- Order: Lepidoptera
- Family: Depressariidae
- Genus: Enteremna
- Species: E. dolerastis

Binomial name
- Enteremna dolerastis (Meyrick, 1890)

Synonyms
- Cryptophaga dolerastis Meyrick, 1890

Species of moth

Enteremna dolerastis is a moth in the family Depressariidae. It was described by Edward Meyrick in 1890. It is found in Australia, where it has been recorded from Western Australia.

The wingspan is about 31 mm. The forewings are light ashy grey, irrorated (sprinkled) with dark grey and with a cloudy dark-grey dot in the disc at two-fifths, traces of a second beneath it, and a third, larger but ill defined, in the disc at two-thirds, as well as a very indistinct transverse darker shade at five-sixths. There is a hindmarginal series of blackish dots. The hindwings are fuscous, becoming paler and more whitish towards the base.

The larvae feed on Banksia species amongst the spun-together leaves of terminal shoots. The larva is grey, irregularly tinged with reddish and greenish, becoming dull greenish beneath and with small, whitish spots. The head is dark brown, marbled with whitish ochreous.
