= Eutorna rubida =

Scientific classification
- Kingdom: Animalia
- Phylum: Arthropoda
- Class: Insecta
- Order: Lepidoptera
- Family: Depressariidae
- Genus: Eutorna
- Species: E. rubida

Binomial name
- Eutorna rubida (Turner, 1919)

Synonyms
- Heterozancla rubida Turner, 1919

Species of moth

Eutorna rubida is a moth in the family Depressariidae. It was described by Alfred Jefferis Turner in 1919. It is found in Australia, where it has been recorded from Victoria.

The wingspan is about 20 mm. The forewings are pale reddish mixed with whitish and suffused with fuscous. The stigmata are blackish, the first discal at one-third, succeeded by a whitish dot. The plical is found beyond the first discal, the second discal before two-thirds, preceded by a whitish dot. There is a blackish streak between the first and second discal, prolonged beyond the latter to the apex, the area between the median streak and costa fuscous and there is a terminal blackish line not reaching the apex. The hindwings are whitish grey.
