= Gymnoceros nipholeuca =

Scientific classification
- Kingdom: Animalia
- Phylum: Arthropoda
- Class: Insecta
- Order: Lepidoptera
- Family: Depressariidae
- Genus: Gymnoceros
- Species: G. nipholeuca

Binomial name
- Gymnoceros nipholeuca (Turner, 1946)

Synonyms
- Platyphylla nipholeuca Turner, 1946

Species of moth

Gymnoceros nipholeuca is a moth in the family Depressariidae. It was described by Turner in 1946. It is found in Australia, where it has been recorded from New South Wales and Queensland.

The wingspan is about 32 mm. The fore- and hindwings are white.
