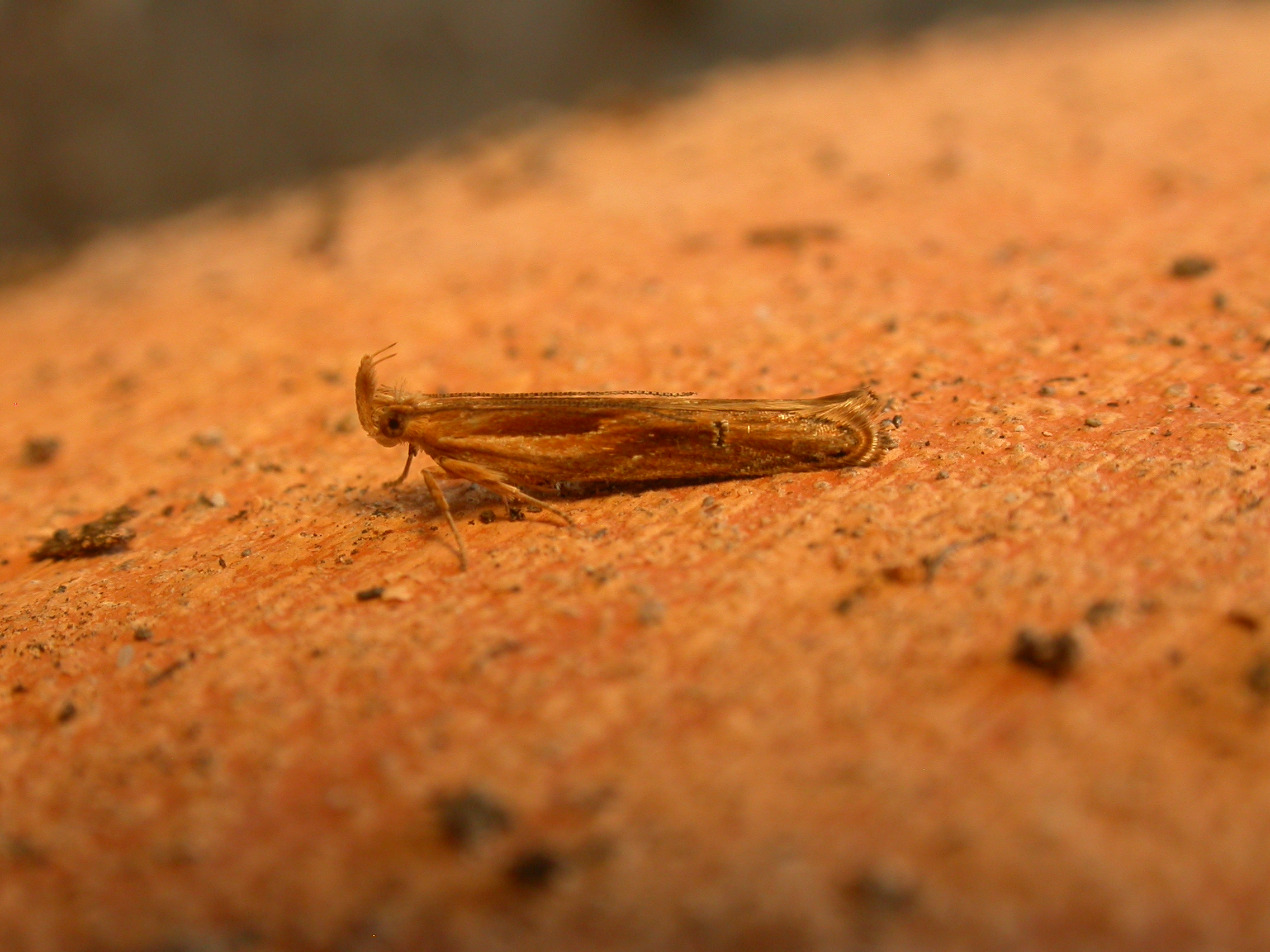

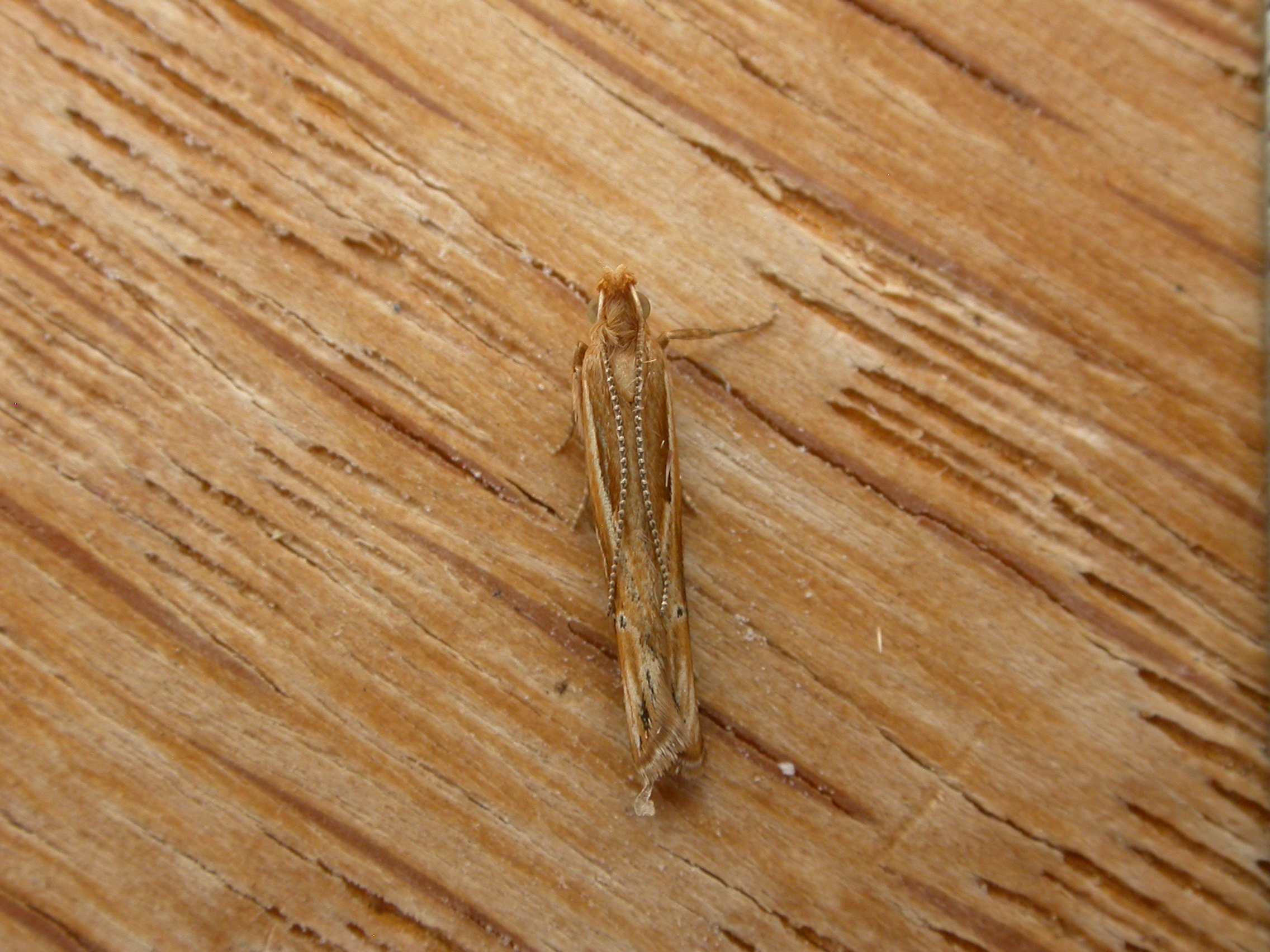

Scientific classification
- Kingdom: Animalia
- Phylum: Arthropoda
- Class: Insecta
- Order: Lepidoptera
- Family: Depressariidae
- Genus: Eutorna
- Species: E. tricasis

Binomial name
- Eutorna tricasis Meyrick, 1906

Synonyms
- Eutorna tricasis Lower, 1897

= Eutorna tricasis =

Species of moth

Eutorna tricasis is a moth of the family Depressariidae. It is found in Australia, where it has been recorded from the eastern part of the country.

The wingspan is 12–16 mm. The forewings are bright ferruginous ochreous, sometimes tinged with brown towards the middle of the costa, the costal edge whitish towards the base and there is a slender whitish median longitudinal streak from the base to two-fifths, edged beneath with blackish except towards the base. There is a fine whitish oblique streak, edged above with some black scales, from one-third of the costa to the upper of two black whitish-circled dots placed transversely in the disc at two-thirds. There is also a fine oblique whitish anteriorly blackish-edged streak from before three-fourths of the costa, not reaching half across the wing. There is also a short white streak from the apex beneath the costa and there are several undefined black marks on the apical portion of the costa and termen. The hindwings are grey, lighter towards the base.
