= Enchocrates glaucopis =

Scientific classification
- Domain: Eukaryota
- Kingdom: Animalia
- Phylum: Arthropoda
- Class: Insecta
- Order: Lepidoptera
- Family: Depressariidae
- Genus: Enchocrates
- Species: E. glaucopis

Binomial name
- Enchocrates glaucopis Meyrick, 1883

Species of moth

Enchocrates glaucopis is a moth in the family Depressariidae. It was described by Edward Meyrick in 1883. It is found in Australia, where it has been recorded from the south-east of the country.

The wingspan is 15–22 mm. The forewings are fuscous grey, the margins narrowly dark fuscous and with the costal edge, hindmarginal edge, and all veins marked by bright carmine lines. There is a very ill-defined straight oblique cloudy dark grey transverse line from the middle of the costa to the inner margin at two-thirds. There is also a very ill-defined roundish pale yellow spot on middle of the inner margin, anteriorly or wholly carmine tinged, margined anteriorly by the transverse dark grey line. There is a round suffused blackish-grey spot on the inner margin at four-fifths, in some specimens very conspicuous, in others absent. There is also an indistinct dark fuscous dot in the disc at two-thirds. The hindwings are grey whitish in males and grey, but paler towards the base in females.
