= Loboptila leurodes =

Scientific classification
- Domain: Eukaryota
- Kingdom: Animalia
- Phylum: Arthropoda
- Class: Insecta
- Order: Lepidoptera
- Family: Depressariidae
- Genus: Loboptila
- Species: L. leurodes

Binomial name
- Loboptila leurodes Turner, 1919

Species of moth

Loboptila leurodes is a moth in the family Depressariidae. It was described by Alfred Jefferis Turner in 1919. It is found in Australia, where it has been recorded from Queensland.

The wingspan is 15–16 mm. The forewings are white with the markings and a few scattered scales dark-fuscous. There is a dot on the dorsum at one-sixths and the discal dots are minute, the first before the middle, the second at two-thirds, the plical obsolete. There is also an elongate mark at three-fourths, connected by irroration with the tornus and representing a posterior line. Two or three dots are found on the costa towards the apex. The hindwings are whitish-grey.
