= Pedois amaurophanes =

Scientific classification
- Domain: Eukaryota
- Kingdom: Animalia
- Phylum: Arthropoda
- Class: Insecta
- Order: Lepidoptera
- Family: Depressariidae
- Genus: Pedois
- Species: P. amaurophanes

Binomial name
- Pedois amaurophanes (Turner, 1947)

Synonyms
- Cryptolechia amaurophanes Turner, 1947

Species of moth

Pedois amaurophanes is a moth in the family Depressariidae. It was described by Alfred Jefferis Turner in 1947. It is found in Australia, where it has been recorded from New South Wales.

The wingspan is about 22 mm. The costal edge of the forewings, towards the base, is tinged with pink. The ground colour is whitish sprinkled with fuscous, which tends to form streaks on the veins. The hindwings are whitish grey.
