= Eutorna phaulocosma =

Scientific classification
- Kingdom: Animalia
- Phylum: Arthropoda
- Clade: Pancrustacea
- Class: Insecta
- Order: Lepidoptera
- Family: Depressariidae
- Genus: Eutorna
- Species: E. phaulocosma

Binomial name
- Eutorna phaulocosma Meyrick, 1906

Synonyms
- Idiozancla ignobilis Turner, 1939

Species of moth

Eutorna phaulocosma is a moth in the family Depressariidae. It was described by Edward Meyrick in 1906. It is found in Australia, where it has been recorded from Tasmania. It is also found in New Zealand.

The wingspan is 15–16 mm. The forewings are fuscous, with a few dark fuscous scales. The stigmata are dark fuscous, the plical directly beneath the first discal and with some undefined dark fuscous dots on the apical portion of the costa and termen. The hindwings are pale grey.
