= Eutorna intonsa =

Scientific classification
- Kingdom: Animalia
- Phylum: Arthropoda
- Class: Insecta
- Order: Lepidoptera
- Family: Depressariidae
- Genus: Eutorna
- Species: E. intonsa

Binomial name
- Eutorna intonsa Meyrick, 1906

Species of moth

Eutorna intonsa is a moth in the family Depressariidae. It was described by Edward Meyrick in 1906. It is found in Australia, where it has been recorded from Victoria, New South Wales and Tasmania.

== Description ==
The wingspan is 11–14 mm. The forewings are ferruginous-ochreous, more or less suffusedly mixed with fuscous and whitish, leaving an undefined median longitudinal streak of clear ground colour. There is a slender median white streak from the base to two-fifths, edged beneath except at the base by a blackish streak, and sometimes extended but without black edging to the discal dot. A slender white oblique streak, edged above with dark fuscous, is found from one-third of the costa to the upper extremity of a transverse white mark in the disc at two-thirds, terminated beneath by an irregular black dot. There is also an oblique white streak, edged anteriorly with dark fuscous, from before three-fourths of the costa, not reaching half across the wing. There is also some whitish suffusion towards the apex and there are several irregular blackish marks on the apical portion of the costa and termen. The hindwings are grey, paler towards the base.
