= Pedois sarcinodes =

Scientific classification
- Kingdom: Animalia
- Phylum: Arthropoda
- Class: Insecta
- Order: Lepidoptera
- Family: Depressariidae
- Genus: Pedois
- Species: P. sarcinodes

Binomial name
- Pedois sarcinodes (Meyrick, 1921)

Synonyms
- Cryptolechia sarcinodes Meyrick, 1921

Species of moth

Pedois sarcinodes is a moth in the family Depressariidae. It was described by Edward Meyrick in 1921. It is found in Australia, where it has been recorded from South Australia.

The wingspan is about 19 mm. The forewings are light pinkish grey, with scattered fuscous or dark fuscous scales. The stigmata are dark fuscous, the plical beneath the first discal and there are undefined marginal dots of dark fuscous irroration on the posterior part of the costa and termen. The hindwings are pale grey.
