= Ectaga garcia =

Scientific classification
- Domain: Eukaryota
- Kingdom: Animalia
- Phylum: Arthropoda
- Class: Insecta
- Order: Lepidoptera
- Family: Depressariidae
- Genus: Ectaga
- Species: E. garcia

Binomial name
- Ectaga garcia Becker, 1994

Species of moth

Ectaga garcia is a moth in the family Depressariidae. It was described by Vitor O. Becker in 1994. It is found in Minas Gerais, Brazil. The species was introduced to northern New South Wales to control Lantana camara. However, the species has failed to establish itself in Australia.

The larvae feed on Lantana camara, Lantana griesebachiana and Lantana montevidensis.
