= Pedois tripunctella =

Scientific classification
- Kingdom: Animalia
- Phylum: Arthropoda
- Class: Insecta
- Order: Lepidoptera
- Family: Depressariidae
- Genus: Pedois
- Species: P. tripunctella

Binomial name
- Pedois tripunctella (Walker, 1864)

Synonyms
- Cryptolechia tripunctella Walker, 1864

Species of moth

Pedois tripunctella is a moth in the family Depressariidae. It was described by Francis Walker in 1864. It is found in Australia, where it has been recorded from Tasmania.

Adults are brown, but cinereous (ash grey) beneath. The forewings are rounded at the tips, with three black points in the disk. The first point is found before the middle and the second is found behind the first, the third beyond the middle. The costa is convex towards the base and the exterior border is slightly convex, very obliquely. The hindwings are cinereous, tinged with aeneous.
