= Eutorna generalis =

Scientific classification
- Kingdom: Animalia
- Phylum: Arthropoda
- Class: Insecta
- Order: Lepidoptera
- Family: Depressariidae
- Genus: Eutorna
- Species: E. generalis

Binomial name
- Eutorna generalis Meyrick, 1921

Species of moth

Eutorna generalis is a moth in the family Depressariidae. It was described by Edward Meyrick in 1921. It is found on Java and in Australia.

The wingspan is 12–13 mm. The forewings are whitish, partially and irregularly tinged with pale ochreous. There are narrow suffused brownish-ochreous streaks from the base beneath the costa to near the middle, from beneath the apex of this to the costa at two-thirds, from near the base above the middle to the costa near the apex, and beneath the fold throughout. The plical and second discal stigmata are black, with some scattered black scales following the plical, and some others towards the costa beyond the middle. There are also indistinct very oblique strigae from the costa before the middle and at two-thirds, indicated by scattered black scales. Some black irroration is found along the dorsal edge posteriorly and there is a series of ill-defined black marginal marks around the apex and termen. The hindwings are light grey.
