= Eutorna spintherias =

Scientific classification
- Kingdom: Animalia
- Phylum: Arthropoda
- Class: Insecta
- Order: Lepidoptera
- Family: Depressariidae
- Genus: Eutorna
- Species: E. spintherias

Binomial name
- Eutorna spintherias Meyrick, 1906

Species of moth

Eutorna spintherias is a moth in the family Depressariidae. It was described by Edward Meyrick in 1906. It is found in Australia, where it has been recorded from Victoria and Tasmania.

The wingspan is 10–12 mm. The forewings are ferruginous ochreous, in males suffused with brown posteriorly except on a median streak, in females wholly suffused with dark brown on the posterior half. The markings in males are silvery white, partly edged with blackish, in females bright silvery metallic, suffusedly edged with dark fuscous. A median longitudinal streak is found from the base to the middle, in males edged beneath by a blackish-fuscous streak from near the base to beyond the middle and there is a slender oblique streak from the costa before the middle to three-fifths of the disc, in females continued along the costa to the base. There is a transverse-oval spot in the disc at two-thirds. There is a subtriangular spot on the costa before three-fourths, as well as an irregular suffused apical spot. The hindwings are grey, becoming darker posteriorly.
