= Peritornenta rhodophanes =

Scientific classification
- Kingdom: Animalia
- Phylum: Arthropoda
- Clade: Pancrustacea
- Class: Insecta
- Order: Lepidoptera
- Family: Depressariidae
- Genus: Peritornenta
- Species: P. rhodophanes

Binomial name
- Peritornenta rhodophanes (Meyrick, 1902)

Synonyms
- Peritorneuta rhodophanes Meyrick, 1902

Species of moth

Peritornenta rhodophanes is a moth in the family Depressariidae. It was described by Edward Meyrick in 1902. It is found in Australia, where it has been recorded from Western Australia.

The wingspan is 16–18 mm. The forewings are pale grey, sometimes suffused with pale pinkish and with the costal edge light rosy. There are numerous dark grey dots, sometimes mostly obsolete, arranged in an irregular transverse series, as well as a larger transverse dark fuscous dot in the disc beyond the middle. The hindwings are light grey or whitish grey.
