= Thalamarchella aneureta =

Scientific classification
- Kingdom: Animalia
- Phylum: Arthropoda
- Class: Insecta
- Order: Lepidoptera
- Family: Depressariidae
- Genus: Thalamarchella
- Species: T. aneureta

Binomial name
- Thalamarchella aneureta Common, 1964

Species of moth

Thalamarchella aneureta is a moth in the family Depressariidae. It was described by Ian Francis Bell Common in 1964. It is found in Australia, where it has been recorded from Western Australia.
