= Enchocrates phaedryntis =

Scientific classification
- Domain: Eukaryota
- Kingdom: Animalia
- Phylum: Arthropoda
- Class: Insecta
- Order: Lepidoptera
- Family: Depressariidae
- Genus: Enchocrates
- Species: E. phaedryntis

Binomial name
- Enchocrates phaedryntis Meyrick, 1888

Species of moth

Enchocrates phaedryntis is a moth in the family Depressariidae. It was described by Edward Meyrick in 1888. It is found in Australia, where it has been recorded from Western Australia.

The wingspan is about 21 mm. The forewings are bright crimson, suffusedly mixed with light ashy-grey, except on the edge. There is a darker purple-grey cloudy line beneath the costal edge and the costal edge is yellow on the basal third, as well as a purplish-fuscous dot in the disc before the middle, a second on the fold slightly before the first, and a third in the disc at two-thirds. There is an irregular indistinct slender yellowish line from the third dot to two-thirds of the inner margin and a moderate triangular yellow spot on the costa somewhat beyond the middle, as well as a cloudy purple-grey line along the hindmargin. The hindwings are ochreous-whitish, the apex of the wing very faintly rosy-tinged.
