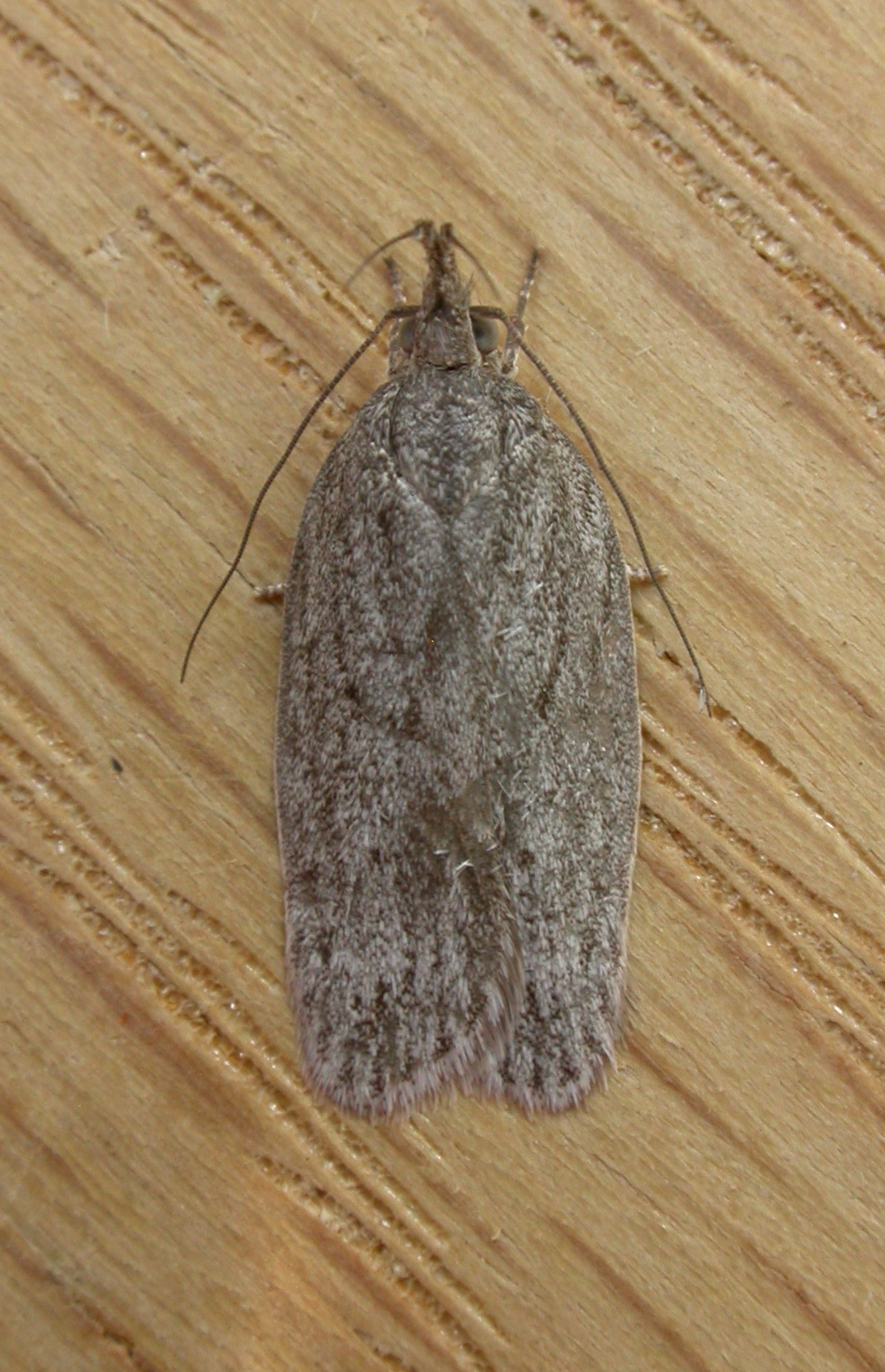

Scientific classification
- Kingdom: Animalia
- Phylum: Arthropoda
- Clade: Pancrustacea
- Class: Insecta
- Order: Lepidoptera
- Family: Depressariidae
- Genus: Pedois
- Species: P. lewinella

Binomial name
- Pedois lewinella (Newman, 1856)

Synonyms
- Depressaria lewinella Newman, 1856; Pedois neurosticha Lower, 1894

= Pedois lewinella =

Species of moth

Pedois lewinella is a species of moth of the family Depressariidae. It is found in Australia, where it has been recorded from southern Queensland, New South Wales, the Australian Capital Territory, Victoria, Tasmania, South Australia and Western Australia.

The wingspan is about 20 mm. The forewings are pale grey covered with dark flecks. The hindwings are plain grey.
