= Loboptila cyphoma =

Scientific classification
- Kingdom: Animalia
- Phylum: Arthropoda
- Class: Insecta
- Order: Lepidoptera
- Family: Depressariidae
- Genus: Loboptila
- Species: L. cyphoma

Binomial name
- Loboptila cyphoma (Meyrick, 1915)

Synonyms
- Odites cyphoma Meyrick, 1915

Species of moth

Loboptila cyphoma is a moth in the family Depressariidae. It was described by Edward Meyrick in 1915. It is found in Australia, where it has been recorded from Queensland.

The wingspan is 14–16 mm. The forewings are ochreous white, with a few scattered fuscous and dark fuscous scales and small fuscous spots on the costa at one-fourth and the middle. There is a broad streak of pale fuscous suffusion irrorated (sprinkled) with dark fuscous extending along the dorsum from near the base to the tornus. The discal stigmata are dark fuscous and there is a transverse patch of dark fuscous irroration in the disc at three-fourths, terminated above by a small blackish mark, the space between this and the termen is sometimes sprinkled with dark fuscous. A fine interrupted dark fuscous line is found around the posterior part of the costa and termen. The hindwings are pale grey.
