= Notosara acosmeta =

Scientific classification
- Domain: Eukaryota
- Kingdom: Animalia
- Phylum: Arthropoda
- Class: Insecta
- Order: Lepidoptera
- Family: Depressariidae
- Genus: Notosara
- Species: N. acosmeta

Binomial name
- Notosara acosmeta (Common, 1964)

Synonyms
- Philetes acosmeta Common, 1964

Species of moth

Notosara acosmeta is a moth in the family Depressariidae. It was described by Ian Francis Bell Common in 1964. It is found in Western Australia.
