= Enchocrates picrophylla =

Scientific classification
- Domain: Eukaryota
- Kingdom: Animalia
- Phylum: Arthropoda
- Class: Insecta
- Order: Lepidoptera
- Family: Depressariidae
- Genus: Enchocrates
- Species: E. picrophylla

Binomial name
- Enchocrates picrophylla Meyrick, 1886

Synonyms
- Enchocrates soreutis Meyrick, 1888

Species of moth

Enchocrates picrophylla is a moth in the family Depressariidae. It was described by Edward Meyrick in 1886. It is found in Australia, where it has been recorded from South Australia and New South Wales.

The wingspan is 20–21 mm. The forewings are pale ochreous grey with the costal edge, inner margin, and all veins obscurely lined with dull flesh colour. There is a fuscous dot beneath the costa at one-sixth and a dark fuscous dot on the fold before the middle, and a second in the disc at two-thirds, as well as three very obscure dull flesh-coloured transverse lines, the first from one-third of the costa, becoming obsolete beneath, the second from the middle of the costa to the anal angle, very strongly angulated in the middle, the third from three-fourths of the costa to the anal angle, strongly curved above the middle. There is a row of well-defined dark fuscous dots along the hindmargin and apical part of the costa. The hindwings are grey whitish.
