= Eutorna epicnephes =

Scientific classification
- Kingdom: Animalia
- Phylum: Arthropoda
- Class: Insecta
- Order: Lepidoptera
- Family: Depressariidae
- Genus: Eutorna
- Species: E. epicnephes

Binomial name
- Eutorna epicnephes Meyrick, 1906

Species of moth

Eutorna epicnephes is a moth in the family Depressariidae. It was described by Edward Meyrick in 1906. It is found in Australia, where it has been recorded from Victoria, New South Wales and Queensland.

The wingspan is 12–15 mm. The forewings are whitish fuscous, sprinkled with fuscous and dark fuscous and with a blackish dot beneath the costa near the base. The stigmata is small and blackish, the plical slightly beyond the first discal, an additional dot beneath the second discal. There is a row of undefined blackish dots around the apex and termen. The hindwings are grey, lighter towards the base.
