= Octasphales chorderes =

Scientific classification
- Kingdom: Animalia
- Phylum: Arthropoda
- Class: Insecta
- Order: Lepidoptera
- Family: Depressariidae
- Genus: Octasphales
- Species: O. chorderes

Binomial name
- Octasphales chorderes Meyrick, 1902

Species of moth

Octasphales chorderes is a moth in the family Depressariidae. It was described by Edward Meyrick in 1902. It is found in Australia, where it has been recorded from Queensland.

The wingspan is 15–16 mm. The forewings are light brown, sometimes rosy-tinged, sometimes mixed with pale ashy-grey in the disc. The costal edge is pale yellow-ochreous, sometimes rosy-suffused. There are numerous indistinct scattered dark brown dots and there is a straight transverse ill-defined dark brown streak from the middle of the costa to four-fifths of the dorsum. The hindwings are rather dark grey with the costal edge and a suffusion along the dorsum pale yellowish.
