= Octasphales eubrocha =

Scientific classification
- Kingdom: Animalia
- Phylum: Arthropoda
- Clade: Pancrustacea
- Class: Insecta
- Order: Lepidoptera
- Family: Depressariidae
- Genus: Octasphales
- Species: O. eubrocha

Binomial name
- Octasphales eubrocha Turner, 1917

Synonyms
- Octasphales technicopa Meyrick, 1920

Species of moth

Octasphales eubrocha is a moth in the family Depressariidae. It was described by Alfred Jefferis Turner in 1917. It is found in Australia, where it has been recorded from Queensland.

The wingspan is 12–15 mm. The forewings are whitish grey with the veins finely dotted with fuscous and with an outwardly-curved line, suffused posteriorly, from one-fourth the costa to one-fourth the dorsum. The costal edge is narrowly ochreous whitish and there is a fine interrupted dark fuscous line on the apex and termen, rarely reaching as far as the tornus. The hindwings are whitish.
