= Pedois rhaphidias =

Scientific classification
- Kingdom: Animalia
- Phylum: Arthropoda
- Class: Insecta
- Order: Lepidoptera
- Family: Depressariidae
- Genus: Pedois
- Species: P. rhaphidias

Binomial name
- Pedois rhaphidias (Turner, 1917)

Synonyms
- Doleromima rhaphidias Turner, 1917

Species of moth

Pedois rhaphidias is a moth in the family Depressariidae. It was described by Alfred Jefferis Turner in 1917. It is found in Australia, where it has been recorded from Queensland.

The forewings are grey whitish, with numerous streaks parallel to the veins, brown mixed with dark fuscous. There is a longitudinal streak in the posterior and lower part of the cell, as well as a darker streak along the fold. On the termen, the ends of the streaks are dilated and nearly confluent. The hindwings are very pale grey.
