= Peritornenta lissopis =

Scientific classification
- Kingdom: Animalia
- Phylum: Arthropoda
- Class: Insecta
- Order: Lepidoptera
- Family: Depressariidae
- Genus: Peritornenta
- Species: P. lissopis

Binomial name
- Peritornenta lissopis (Turner, 1947)

Synonyms
- Peritorneuta lissopis Turner, 1947

Species of moth

Peritornenta lissopis is a moth in the family Depressariidae. It was described by Alfred Jefferis Turner in 1947. It is found in Australia, where it has been recorded from Queensland.
