= Sanator =

Sanator may refer to:

- Chionodes sanator, species of moth
- Sanator, South Dakota, unincorporated community
