= Chionodes johnstoni =

Scientific classification
- Kingdom: Animalia
- Phylum: Arthropoda
- Clade: Pancrustacea
- Class: Insecta
- Order: Lepidoptera
- Family: Gelechiidae
- Genus: Chionodes
- Species: C. johnstoni

Binomial name
- Chionodes johnstoni Clarke, 1947

Species of moth

Chionodes johnstoni is a moth in the family Gelechiidae. It is found in North America, where it has been recorded from California. The Global Lepidoptera Names Index has it as a synonym of Chionodes gilvomaculella.
