= Chionodes nephelophracta =

Scientific classification
- Kingdom: Animalia
- Phylum: Arthropoda
- Clade: Pancrustacea
- Class: Insecta
- Order: Lepidoptera
- Family: Gelechiidae
- Genus: Chionodes
- Species: C. nephelophracta

Binomial name
- Chionodes nephelophracta (Meyrick, 1932)

Synonyms
- Gelechia nephelophracta Meyrick, 1932

Species of moth

Chionodes nephelophracta is a moth in the family Gelechiidae. It is found in Costa Rica.
