= Chionodes permacta =

Scientific classification
- Kingdom: Animalia
- Phylum: Arthropoda
- Clade: Pancrustacea
- Class: Insecta
- Order: Lepidoptera
- Family: Gelechiidae
- Genus: Chionodes
- Species: C. permacta

Binomial name
- Chionodes permacta (Braun, 1925)

Synonyms
- Gelechia permacta Braun, 1925

Species of moth

Chionodes permacta is a moth in the family Gelechiidae. It is found in North America, where it has been recorded from western Alaska, southern Yukon and Alberta to Idaho, Wyoming, Montana, Washington, Colorado and southern Oregon.
