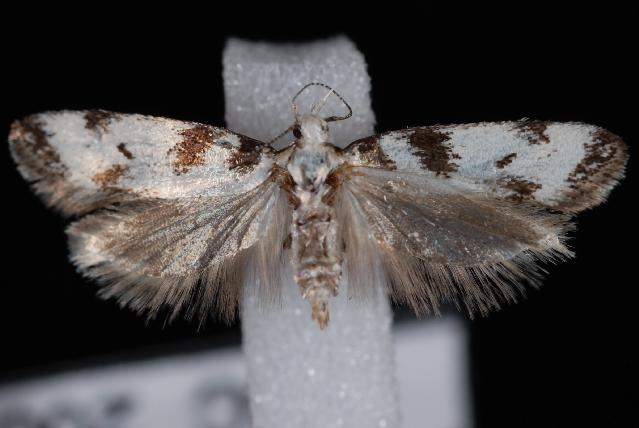

Scientific classification
- Kingdom: Animalia
- Phylum: Arthropoda
- Clade: Pancrustacea
- Class: Insecta
- Order: Lepidoptera
- Family: Gelechiidae
- Genus: Chionodes
- Species: C. lictor

Binomial name
- Chionodes lictor Hodges, 1999

= Chionodes lictor =

Species of moth

Chionodes lictor is a moth in the family Gelechiidae. It is found in North America, where it has been recorded from California, Oregon and British Columbia.

The larvae feed on Pseudotsuga menziesii.
