= Chionodes hinnella =

Scientific classification
- Kingdom: Animalia
- Phylum: Arthropoda
- Clade: Pancrustacea
- Class: Insecta
- Order: Lepidoptera
- Family: Gelechiidae
- Genus: Chionodes
- Species: C. hinnella

Binomial name
- Chionodes hinnella (Rebel, 1935)

Synonyms
- Gelechia hinnella Rebel, 1935

Species of moth

Chionodes hinnella is a moth of the family Gelechiidae. It is found in Spain.

The length of the forewings is 7–8 mm.
