= Chionodes hapsus =

Scientific classification
- Kingdom: Animalia
- Phylum: Arthropoda
- Clade: Pancrustacea
- Class: Insecta
- Order: Lepidoptera
- Family: Gelechiidae
- Genus: Chionodes
- Species: C. hapsus

Binomial name
- Chionodes hapsus Hodges, 1999

Species of moth

Chionodes hapsus is a moth in the family Gelechiidae. It is found in North America, where it has been recorded from southern Ontario, New Jersey, New York, Maryland, Kentucky, Pennsylvania, Ohio, Missouri, Oklahoma and Arkansas.

The larvae feed on Quercus alba and Quercus macrocarpa.
