= Chionodes salicella =

Scientific classification
- Kingdom: Animalia
- Phylum: Arthropoda
- Clade: Pancrustacea
- Class: Insecta
- Order: Lepidoptera
- Family: Gelechiidae
- Genus: Chionodes
- Species: C. salicella

Binomial name
- Chionodes salicella Sattler, 1967

Species of moth

Chionodes salicella is a moth in the family Gelechiidae. It is found in North America, where it has been recorded from British Columbia to California and in Montana.

The larvae feed on Salix and Alnus species.
