= Chionodes helicosticta =

Scientific classification
- Kingdom: Animalia
- Phylum: Arthropoda
- Clade: Pancrustacea
- Class: Insecta
- Order: Lepidoptera
- Family: Gelechiidae
- Genus: Chionodes
- Species: C. helicosticta

Binomial name
- Chionodes helicosticta (Meyrick, 1929)

Synonyms
- Gelechia helicosticta Meyrick, 1929

Species of moth

Chionodes helicosticta is a moth in the family Gelechiidae. It is found in North America, where it has been recorded from Texas, Arizona, California and Oregon.

The wingspan is 19–22 mm.

The larvae feed on Eriogonum nudum.
