= Chionodes neptica =

Scientific classification
- Kingdom: Animalia
- Phylum: Arthropoda
- Clade: Pancrustacea
- Class: Insecta
- Order: Lepidoptera
- Family: Gelechiidae
- Genus: Chionodes
- Species: C. neptica

Binomial name
- Chionodes neptica (Walsingham, 1911)

Synonyms
- Gelechia neptica Walsingham, 1911

Species of moth

Chionodes neptica is a moth in the family Gelechiidae. It is found in Mexico (Guerrero).

The wingspan is about 15 mm. The forewings are yellowish brown, with some scattered dark fuscous scales. There is a dark fuscous spot at the base of the dorsum, and a small one in the middle of the fold, with another at the outer end of the fold. The first plical spot is followed by an oblique, elongate, very dark fuscous discal spot, a smaller costal spot preceding the cilia. The pale yellowish brown terminal cilia are much dusted with dark fuscous which is thicker at and around the apex. The hindwings are pale brownish grey.
