= Chionodes creberrima =

Scientific classification
- Kingdom: Animalia
- Phylum: Arthropoda
- Clade: Pancrustacea
- Class: Insecta
- Order: Lepidoptera
- Family: Gelechiidae
- Genus: Chionodes
- Species: C. creberrima

Binomial name
- Chionodes creberrima (Walsingham, 1911)

Synonyms
- Gelechia creberrima Walsingham, 1911

Species of moth

Chionodes creberrima is a moth in the family Gelechiidae. It is found in Mexico (Guerrero).

The wingspan is about 13 mm. The forewings are reddish brown, profusely dusted with whitish cinereous, which is especially concentrated around the margins of a large, somewhat triangular, brown costal patch before the middle, reaching nearly to the fold, on which is a small spot of the same colour, a less conspicuous discal spot lying above and beyond it. A small pale cinereous spot occurs on the costa at three-fourths from the base. The hindwings are shining, pale bone-grey, dusted at the apex on the underside.
