= Chionodes sevir =

Scientific classification
- Kingdom: Animalia
- Phylum: Arthropoda
- Clade: Pancrustacea
- Class: Insecta
- Order: Lepidoptera
- Family: Gelechiidae
- Genus: Chionodes
- Species: C. sevir

Binomial name
- Chionodes sevir Hodges, 1999

Species of moth

Chionodes sevir is a moth in the family Gelechiidae. It is found in North America, where it has been recorded from Massachusetts to Florida, Kentucky, Texas and North Carolina.

The larvae are leaf-tiers on Quercus species of the red oak group.
