= Chionodes bufo =

Scientific classification
- Kingdom: Animalia
- Phylum: Arthropoda
- Clade: Pancrustacea
- Class: Insecta
- Order: Lepidoptera
- Family: Gelechiidae
- Genus: Chionodes
- Species: C. bufo

Binomial name
- Chionodes bufo (Walsingham, 1911)

Synonyms
- Gelechia bufo Walsingham, 1911

Species of moth

Chionodes bufo is a moth in the family Gelechiidae. It is found in Mexico (Guerrero).

The wingspan is 13–14 mm. The forewings are yellowish brown, mottled with black. There is a triangular black costal spot after a small black spot at the extreme base of the costa at one-third, produced toward to the fold, and then diffused in an overflow of blackish scales along the dorsum to a cloudy spot of the same before the tornus. There is also a smaller black spot on the middle of the costa, with another placed obliquely below it on the cell, and a third costal spot before the cilia, as well as the terminal and apical area, being much clouded with thickly bestrewed blackish scales, some appearing also on the brownish ochreous cilia. Hindwings are leaden grey.
