= Chionodes notandella =

Scientific classification
- Kingdom: Animalia
- Phylum: Arthropoda
- Clade: Pancrustacea
- Class: Insecta
- Order: Lepidoptera
- Family: Gelechiidae
- Genus: Chionodes
- Species: C. notandella

Binomial name
- Chionodes notandella (Busck, 1916)

Synonyms
- Gelechia notandella Busck, 1916

Species of moth

Chionodes notandella is a moth in the family Gelechiidae. It is found in North America, where it has been recorded from Wyoming, Arizona and California.

The wingspan is about 24 mm. The forewings are dark fuscous, longitudinally streaked with whitish fuscous, except on the extreme tip of the wing which is uniform dark fuscous. Just beyond the middle of the cell is a black spot and at the end of the cell is a similar spot, both are slightly edged with white scales. There is a series of ill-defined black dots around the apical edge. The hindwings are dark fuscous.

The larvae feed on Eriogonum latifolium.
