= Chionodes sepultor =

Scientific classification
- Kingdom: Animalia
- Phylum: Arthropoda
- Clade: Pancrustacea
- Class: Insecta
- Order: Lepidoptera
- Family: Gelechiidae
- Genus: Chionodes
- Species: C. sepultor

Binomial name
- Chionodes sepultor Hodges, 1999

Species of moth

Chionodes sepultor is a moth in the family Gelechiidae. It is found in North America, where it has been recorded from Wyoming, Utah, Nebraska, South Dakota, Colorado, Washington, Montana and Oregon.
