= Chionodes praetor =

Scientific classification
- Kingdom: Animalia
- Phylum: Arthropoda
- Clade: Pancrustacea
- Class: Insecta
- Order: Lepidoptera
- Family: Gelechiidae
- Genus: Chionodes
- Species: C. praetor

Binomial name
- Chionodes praetor Hodges, 1999

Species of moth

Chionodes praetor is a moth in the family Gelechiidae. It is found in North America, where it has been recorded from southern Manitoba and southern British Columbia to Utah, Colorado, Arizona and California.

The larvae feed on Abies lasiocarpa, Picea pungens and Pinus contorta.
