= Chionodes factor =

Scientific classification
- Kingdom: Animalia
- Phylum: Arthropoda
- Clade: Pancrustacea
- Class: Insecta
- Order: Lepidoptera
- Family: Gelechiidae
- Genus: Chionodes
- Species: C. factor

Binomial name
- Chionodes factor Hodges, 1999

Species of moth

Chionodes factor is a moth in the family Gelechiidae. It is found in North America, where it has been recorded from California.
