= Chionodes eburata =

Scientific classification
- Kingdom: Animalia
- Phylum: Arthropoda
- Clade: Pancrustacea
- Class: Insecta
- Order: Lepidoptera
- Family: Gelechiidae
- Genus: Chionodes
- Species: C. eburata

Binomial name
- Chionodes eburata (Meyrick, 1917)

Synonyms
- Gelechia eburata Meyrick, 1917

Species of moth

Chionodes eburata is a moth in the family Gelechiidae. It is found in Colombia.

The wingspan is 14–15 mm. The forewings are dark ashy-fuscous. The stigmata are black, obscure, with the plical situated rather obliquely before the first discal. A small cloudy white dot is present on the costa at three-fourths and sometimes one or two white scales on the upper part of the termen. The hindwings are dark grey.
