= Chionodes mongolica =

Scientific classification
- Kingdom: Animalia
- Phylum: Arthropoda
- Clade: Pancrustacea
- Class: Insecta
- Order: Lepidoptera
- Family: Gelechiidae
- Genus: Chionodes
- Species: C. mongolica

Binomial name
- Chionodes mongolica Piskunov, 1979

Synonyms
- Chionodes ukrainica Piskunov, 1979; Chionodes mongolicus

Species of moth

Chionodes mongolica is a moth of the family Gelechiidae. It is found in Ukraine, Russia (southern Ural, Tuva, Irkutsk Oblast, Transbaikal), North Korea, China (Jilin) and Mongolia.
