= Chionodes whitmanella =

Scientific classification
- Kingdom: Animalia
- Phylum: Arthropoda
- Clade: Pancrustacea
- Class: Insecta
- Order: Lepidoptera
- Family: Gelechiidae
- Genus: Chionodes
- Species: C. whitmanella

Binomial name
- Chionodes whitmanella Clarke, 1942

Species of moth

Chionodes whitmanella is a moth in the family Gelechiidae. It is found in North America, where it has been recorded from south-western Manitoba and eastern Washington to Colorado, Arizona and California.
