= Chionodes hostis =

Scientific classification
- Kingdom: Animalia
- Phylum: Arthropoda
- Clade: Pancrustacea
- Class: Insecta
- Order: Lepidoptera
- Family: Gelechiidae
- Genus: Chionodes
- Species: C. hostis

Binomial name
- Chionodes hostis Hodges, 1999

Species of moth

Chionodes hostis is a moth in the family Gelechiidae. It is found in North America, where it has been recorded from Utah, Arizona and New Mexico.

The larvae feed on Quercus gambelii and Quercus turbinella.
