= Chionodes arenella =

Scientific classification
- Kingdom: Animalia
- Phylum: Arthropoda
- Clade: Pancrustacea
- Class: Insecta
- Order: Lepidoptera
- Family: Gelechiidae
- Genus: Chionodes
- Species: C. arenella

Binomial name
- Chionodes arenella (Forbes, 1922)

Synonyms
- Gelechia arenella Forbes, 1922

Species of moth

Chionodes arenella is a moth in the family Gelechiidae. It is found in North America, where it has been recorded from Nova Scotia to Virginia.

The wingspan is about 20 mm. The forewings are clay colour with darker greyish shading between the veins, leaving the veins contrastingly pale. The inner and outer discal points are round, and a point in the fold before the inner one are all black. There are a few scattered black-tipped scales, gathering into faint antemedial dots in cell and above inner margin, and along the outer margin, and forming a streak below the basal part of the subcosta. The hindwings are pale pearl grey.

The larvae are borers on Ammophila breviligulata.
