= Chionodes metallica =

Scientific classification
- Kingdom: Animalia
- Phylum: Arthropoda
- Clade: Pancrustacea
- Class: Insecta
- Order: Lepidoptera
- Family: Gelechiidae
- Genus: Chionodes
- Species: C. metallica

Binomial name
- Chionodes metallica (Braun, 1921)

Synonyms
- Gelechia metallicus Braun, 1921; Chionodes metallicus

Species of moth

Chionodes metallica is a moth in the family Gelechiidae. It is found in North America, where it has been recorded from southern Alberta, Montana and Wyoming.

The wingspan is 9.5-11.5 mm. The forewings are lustrous dark bronzy brown. The hindwings are shining pale fuscous, with slightly yellowish elongate scales on the disc.
