= Chionodes bicostomaculella =

Scientific classification
- Kingdom: Animalia
- Phylum: Arthropoda
- Clade: Pancrustacea
- Class: Insecta
- Order: Lepidoptera
- Family: Gelechiidae
- Genus: Chionodes
- Species: C. bicostomaculella

Binomial name
- Chionodes bicostomaculella (Chambers, 1872)

Synonyms
- Depressaria bicosto-maculella Chambers, 1872; Adrasteia quercifoliella Chambers, 1872

Species of moth

Chionodes bicostomaculella is a moth in the family Gelechiidae. It is found in North America, where it has been recorded from Vermont and Michigan to Florida and Texas.

The forewings are blackish, or very dark brown, intermixed with ochreous and grey and with a small and indistinct ochreous spot on the costa near the base, and another distinct costalis at the beginning of the cilia, and an opposite dorsal one. There are several rather undefined irregular blackish spots or patches on the wings, which appear to form three irregular transverse bands, not very definite in outline, one of which adjoins each of the costal ochreous spots, while the other is between them.

The larvae feed on Quercus species.
