= Chionodes nigrobarbata =

Scientific classification
- Kingdom: Animalia
- Phylum: Arthropoda
- Clade: Pancrustacea
- Class: Insecta
- Order: Lepidoptera
- Family: Gelechiidae
- Genus: Chionodes
- Species: C. nigrobarbata

Binomial name
- Chionodes nigrobarbata (Braun, 1925)

Synonyms
- Gelechia nigrobarbata Braun, 1925

Species of moth

Chionodes nigrobarbata is a moth in the family Gelechiidae. It is found in North America, where it has been recorded from Alberta and British Columbia to Colorado and Oregon.
