= Chionodes aristella =

Scientific classification
- Kingdom: Animalia
- Phylum: Arthropoda
- Clade: Pancrustacea
- Class: Insecta
- Order: Lepidoptera
- Family: Gelechiidae
- Genus: Chionodes
- Species: C. aristella

Binomial name
- Chionodes aristella (Busck, 1903)

Synonyms
- Gelechia aristella Busck, 1903

Species of moth

Chionodes aristella is a moth in the family Gelechiidae. It is found in North America, where it has been recorded from Arizona and Colorado.

The wingspan is about 22 mm. The forewings are deep purplish black with two conspicuous broad longitudinal canary-yellow streaks, one from the base along and immediately below the costal edge to the apical third, the other, which is broader, from the base along and including the entire dorsal edge nearly to the apex. The hindwings are light silvery fuscous.
