= Chionodes cacoderma =

Scientific classification
- Kingdom: Animalia
- Phylum: Arthropoda
- Clade: Pancrustacea
- Class: Insecta
- Order: Lepidoptera
- Family: Gelechiidae
- Genus: Chionodes
- Species: C. cacoderma

Binomial name
- Chionodes cacoderma (Walsingham, 1911)

Synonyms
- Gelechia cacoderma Walsingham, 1911

Species of moth

Chionodes cacoderma is a moth in the family Gelechiidae. It is found in Mexico (Guerrero).

The wingspan is 16–21 mm. The forewings are tawny fuscous, intermingled with pale brownish ochreous and blotched with brownish fuscous, the markings being scarcely distinguishable in the somewhat rough and mixed scaling. The darker blotching apparently coincides with a medio-plical spot, a discal spot beyond it, and another at the end of the cell, and forms a costal spot at one-fourth, another at three-fifths, and an apical shade preceded by an ill-defined transverse pale band. The hindwings are bronzy brownish.
