= Chionodes metoecus =

Scientific classification
- Kingdom: Animalia
- Phylum: Arthropoda
- Clade: Pancrustacea
- Class: Insecta
- Order: Lepidoptera
- Family: Gelechiidae
- Genus: Chionodes
- Species: C. metoecus

Binomial name
- Chionodes metoecus Hodges, 1999

Species of moth

Chionodes metoecus is a moth in the family Gelechiidae. It is found in North America, where it has been recorded from southern British Columbia, Montana, Oregon, Colorado, Utah, Arizona, New Mexico, Nevada and California.

The larvae are leaf-tiers on Acer glabrum.
