= Chionodes pinguicula =

Scientific classification
- Kingdom: Animalia
- Phylum: Arthropoda
- Clade: Pancrustacea
- Class: Insecta
- Order: Lepidoptera
- Family: Gelechiidae
- Genus: Chionodes
- Species: C. pinguicula

Binomial name
- Chionodes pinguicula (Meyrick, 1929)

Synonyms
- Gelechia pinguicula Meyrick, 1929

Species of moth

Chionodes pinguicula is a moth in the family Gelechiidae. It is found in North America, where it has been recorded from Utah, Colorado, Texas, New Mexico, Arizona, Nevada and California.

The wingspan is 13–15 mm.

The larvae feed on Atriplex canescens.
