= Chionodes soella =

Scientific classification
- Kingdom: Animalia
- Phylum: Arthropoda
- Clade: Pancrustacea
- Class: Insecta
- Order: Lepidoptera
- Family: Gelechiidae
- Genus: Chionodes
- Species: C. soella

Binomial name
- Chionodes soella Huemer & Sattler, 1995

Species of moth

Chionodes soella is a moth of the family Gelechiidae. It is found in Russia (Transbaikal, Ural and Altai Mountains). The habitat consists of taiga forests.

The larvae possibly feed on Larix sibirica.
