= Chionodes xanthophilella =

Scientific classification
- Kingdom: Animalia
- Phylum: Arthropoda
- Clade: Pancrustacea
- Class: Insecta
- Order: Lepidoptera
- Family: Gelechiidae
- Genus: Chionodes
- Species: C. xanthophilella

Binomial name
- Chionodes xanthophilella (Barnes & Busck, 1920)

Synonyms
- Gelechia xanthophilella Barnes & Busck, 1920

Species of moth

Chionodes xanthophilella is a moth in the family Gelechiidae first described by William Barnes and August Busck in 1920. It is found in North America, where it has been recorded from California, Arizona, Nevada, New Mexico, Texas and North Dakota.

The wingspan is 11–14 mm. The forewings are light yellow with a blackish-brown longitudinal streak through the middle of the wing from the base to the middle of the cell, where it bends obliquely upwards to the middle of costa. The costal edge above this line is sprinkled with black and there is an ill-defined, irregular blackish-brown fascia at the apical third, containing a short black transverse spot at the end of the cell. The hindwings are silvery white.
