= Chionodes iridescens =

Scientific classification
- Kingdom: Animalia
- Phylum: Arthropoda
- Clade: Pancrustacea
- Class: Insecta
- Order: Lepidoptera
- Family: Gelechiidae
- Genus: Chionodes
- Species: C. iridescens

Binomial name
- Chionodes iridescens Clarke, 1947

Species of insect

Chionodes iridescens is a moth in the family Gelechiidae. It is found in North America, where it has been recorded from southern Yukon to Washington, the Northwest Territories and to Nova Scotia.

The larvae feed on Arctostaphylos uva-ursi.
