= Chionodes bastuliella =

Scientific classification
- Kingdom: Animalia
- Phylum: Arthropoda
- Clade: Pancrustacea
- Class: Insecta
- Order: Lepidoptera
- Family: Gelechiidae
- Genus: Chionodes
- Species: C. bastuliella

Binomial name
- Chionodes bastuliella (Rebel, 1931)

Synonyms
- Gelechia bastuliella Rebel, 1931

Species of moth

Chionodes bastuliella is a moth of the family Gelechiidae. It is found in Spain.

The wingspan is about 14 mm for males and 12 mm for females.
