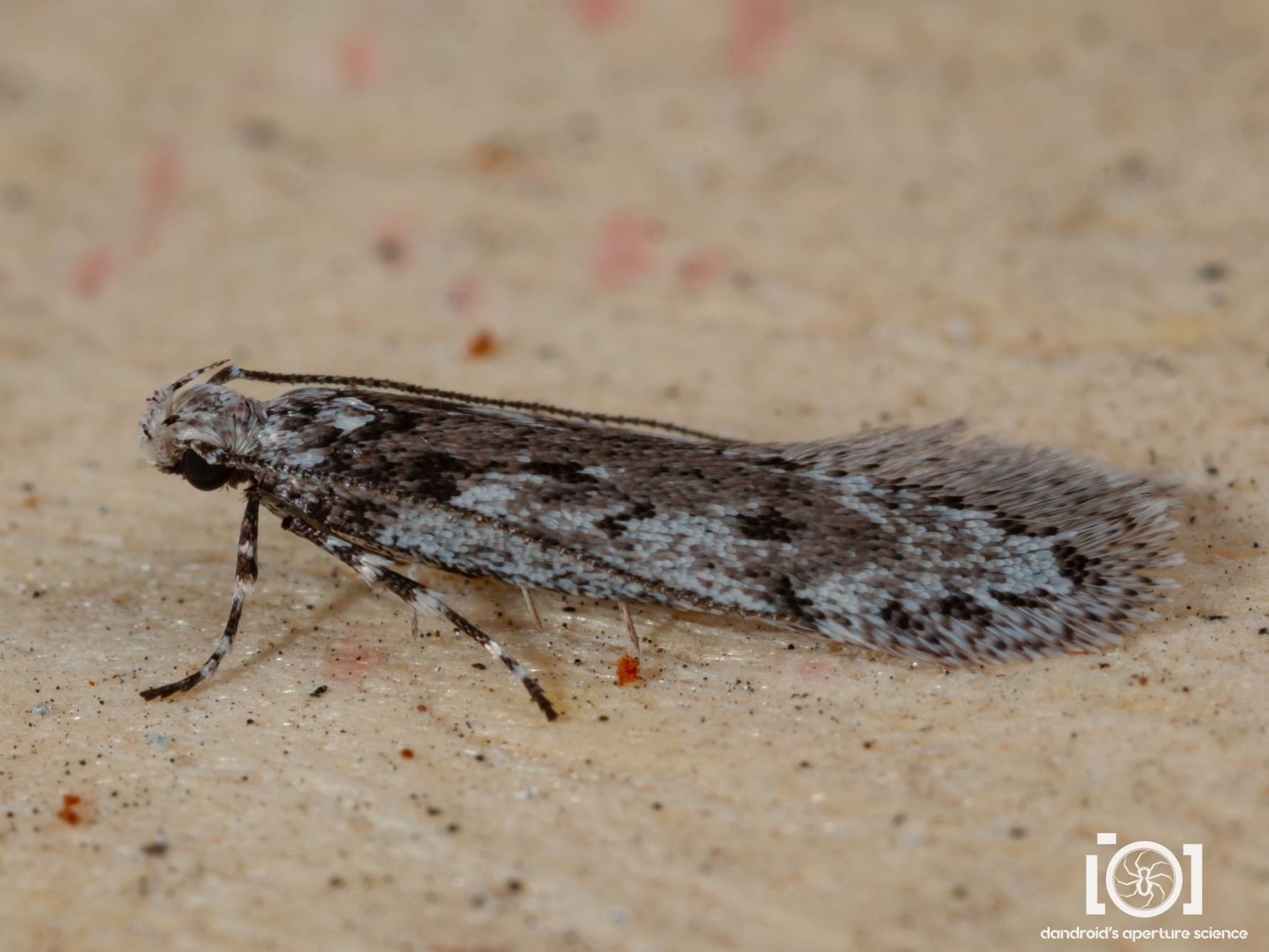

Scientific classification
- Kingdom: Animalia
- Phylum: Arthropoda
- Clade: Pancrustacea
- Class: Insecta
- Order: Lepidoptera
- Family: Gelechiidae
- Genus: Chionodes
- Species: C. rectifex

Binomial name
- Chionodes rectifex Hodges, 1999

= Chionodes rectifex =

Species of moth

Chionodes rectifex is a species of moth in the family Gelechiidae. It is found in the eastern United States, where it has been recorded from North Carolina to Florida.
