= Chionodes pleroma =

Scientific classification
- Kingdom: Animalia
- Phylum: Arthropoda
- Clade: Pancrustacea
- Class: Insecta
- Order: Lepidoptera
- Family: Gelechiidae
- Genus: Chionodes
- Species: C. pleroma

Binomial name
- Chionodes pleroma (Walsingham, 1911)

Synonyms
- Gelechia pleroma Walsingham, 1911

Species of moth

Chionodes pleroma is a moth in the family Gelechiidae. It is found in Mexico (Guerrero, Oaxaca).

The wingspan is about 16 mm. The forewings are purplish fuscous, with very faintly indicated pale brownish cinereous mottling, a small costal spot of the same at three-fourths from the base somewhat more distinct. The hindwings are bronzy brownish.
