= Chionodes sistrella =

Scientific classification
- Kingdom: Animalia
- Phylum: Arthropoda
- Clade: Pancrustacea
- Class: Insecta
- Order: Lepidoptera
- Family: Gelechiidae
- Genus: Chionodes
- Species: C. sistrella

Binomial name
- Chionodes sistrella (Busck, 1903)

Synonyms
- Gelechia sistrella Busck, 1903

Species of moth

Chionodes sistrella is a moth in the family Gelechiidae. It is found in North America, where it has been recorded from Alberta, Colorado, Texas, southern Nevada, Arizona, New Mexico, California and Mississippi.

The wingspan is 9–10 mm. The forewings are deep black and pure silvery white, with a broad longitudinal black band in the middle of the wing, equidistant from the costal and dorsal edge, starting at base of the costa and reaching one-half of the length of the wing, where it turns sharply rectangularly upward, reaching the costal edge and thus inclosing a narrow, longitudinal costal white patch. The apical two-fifths are black, with two white large rounded opposite costal and dorsal spots. The rest of the wing have a nearly straight white fascia just outside the middle of the wing. The hindwings are silvery fuscous. Adults are on wing from March to October.

The larvae feed on Suaeda fruticosa, Suaeda moquini, Suaeda torreyana and Atriplex semibaccata.
