= Chionodes apolectella =

Scientific classification
- Kingdom: Animalia
- Phylum: Arthropoda
- Clade: Pancrustacea
- Class: Insecta
- Order: Lepidoptera
- Family: Gelechiidae
- Genus: Chionodes
- Species: C. apolectella

Binomial name
- Chionodes apolectella (Walsingham, 1900)

Synonyms
- Gelechia apolectella Walsingham, 1900

Species of moth

Chionodes apolectella is a moth of the family Gelechiidae. It is found on Corsica and Sardinia.

The wingspan is about 18 mm. The forewings are whitish, with a slight ochreous tinge, shaded with pale brownish along the dorsum. The hindwings are shining bluish grey.
