= Chionodes icriodes =

Scientific classification
- Kingdom: Animalia
- Phylum: Arthropoda
- Clade: Pancrustacea
- Class: Insecta
- Order: Lepidoptera
- Family: Gelechiidae
- Genus: Chionodes
- Species: C. icriodes

Binomial name
- Chionodes icriodes (Meyrick, 1931)

Synonyms
- Gelechia icriodes Meyrick, 1931

Species of moth

Chionodes icriodes is a moth in the family Gelechiidae. It is found in Argentina and southern Chile.
