= Chionodes luteogeminatus =

Scientific classification
- Kingdom: Animalia
- Phylum: Arthropoda
- Clade: Pancrustacea
- Class: Insecta
- Order: Lepidoptera
- Family: Gelechiidae
- Genus: Chionodes
- Species: C. luteogeminatus

Binomial name
- Chionodes luteogeminatus (Clarke, 1935)

Synonyms
- Gelechia luteogeminatus Clarke, 1935

Species of moth

Chionodes luteogeminatus is a moth in the family Gelechiidae. It is found in North America, where it has been recorded from Iowa, Washington, Oregon and California.

The wingspan is about 22 mm.

The larvae feed on Eriogonum niveum.
