= Chionodes caespitella =

Scientific classification
- Kingdom: Animalia
- Phylum: Arthropoda
- Clade: Pancrustacea
- Class: Insecta
- Order: Lepidoptera
- Family: Gelechiidae
- Genus: Chionodes
- Species: C. caespitella

Binomial name
- Chionodes caespitella (Zeller, 1877)

Synonyms
- Gelechia caespitella Zeller, 1877

Species of moth

Chionodes caespitella is a moth in the family Gelechiidae. It is found in Colombia.
