= Chionodes chlorocephala =

Scientific classification
- Kingdom: Animalia
- Phylum: Arthropoda
- Clade: Pancrustacea
- Class: Insecta
- Order: Lepidoptera
- Family: Gelechiidae
- Genus: Chionodes
- Species: C. chlorocephala

Binomial name
- Chionodes chlorocephala (Meyrick, 1932)

Synonyms
- Gelechia chlorocephala Meyrick, 1932

Species of moth

Chionodes chlorocephala is a moth in the family Gelechiidae. It is found in North America, where it has been recorded from New Mexico, California and Mexico.
