= Chionodes concinna =

Scientific classification
- Kingdom: Animalia
- Phylum: Arthropoda
- Clade: Pancrustacea
- Class: Insecta
- Order: Lepidoptera
- Family: Gelechiidae
- Genus: Chionodes
- Species: C. concinna

Binomial name
- Chionodes concinna (Walsingham, 1911)

Synonyms
- Gelechia concinna Walsingham, 1911

Species of moth

Chionodes concinna is a moth in the family Gelechiidae. It is found in Mexico (Guerrero).

The wingspan is about 10 mm. The forewings are creamy white, delicately shaded with brownish ochreous, especially below the fold and about the end of the cell. There is a minute fuscous spot at the base of the costa, followed by a triangular fuscous shade, of which the outer extremity scarcely reaches beyond the middle. A small fuscous spot at the commencement of the costal cilia precedes an outwardly angulate unsprinkled band of the pale ground colour, beyond which the apical and terminal portion of the wing is slightly shaded. There is a small fuscous dot in the fold, below the apex of the costal triangle, and another at the end of the cell. The hindwings are shining, pale grey.
