= Chionodes kincaidella =

Scientific classification
- Kingdom: Animalia
- Phylum: Arthropoda
- Clade: Pancrustacea
- Class: Insecta
- Order: Lepidoptera
- Family: Gelechiidae
- Genus: Chionodes
- Species: C. kincaidella

Binomial name
- Chionodes kincaidella (Busck, 1907)

Synonyms
- Gelechia kincaidella Busck, 1907; Gnorimoschema laguna Busck, 1912; Gelechia coticola Busck, 1913; Gelechia chloroschema Meyrick, 1923; Gelechia notochlora Meyrick, 1929; Chionodes acanthocarpae Clarke, 1947

Species of moth

Chionodes kincaidella is a moth in the family Gelechiidae. It is found in North America, where it has been recorded from south-western Alberta to Texas, New Mexico and California.

The wingspan is 17–21 mm.

The larvae feed on Atriplex acanthocarpa.
