= Chionodes acerella =

Scientific classification
- Kingdom: Animalia
- Phylum: Arthropoda
- Clade: Pancrustacea
- Class: Insecta
- Order: Lepidoptera
- Family: Gelechiidae
- Genus: Chionodes
- Species: C. acerella

Binomial name
- Chionodes acerella Sattler, 1967

Species of moth

Chionodes acerella is a moth in the family Gelechiidae. It is found in North America, where it has been recorded from British Columbia.

The larvae feed on Acer species.
