= Chionodes landryi =

Scientific classification
- Kingdom: Animalia
- Phylum: Arthropoda
- Clade: Pancrustacea
- Class: Insecta
- Order: Lepidoptera
- Family: Gelechiidae
- Genus: Chionodes
- Species: C. landryi

Binomial name
- Chionodes landryi Hodges, 1999

Species of moth

Chionodes landryi is a moth in the family Gelechiidae. It is found in North America, where it has been recorded from Alberta, New Mexico and Wyoming.
