= Chionodes salva =

Scientific classification
- Kingdom: Animalia
- Phylum: Arthropoda
- Clade: Pancrustacea
- Class: Insecta
- Order: Lepidoptera
- Family: Gelechiidae
- Genus: Chionodes
- Species: C. salva

Binomial name
- Chionodes salva (Meyrick, 1925)

Synonyms
- Phthorimaea salva Meyrick, 1925; Gelechia leucocephala Walsingham, 1897 (preocc.)

Species of moth

Chionodes salva is a moth in the family Gelechiidae. It is found in the West Indies.

The wingspan is about 10 mm. The forewings are pale ochreous, with dark brownish-fuscous mottlings or ill-defined patches, the first at the base reaching the costa, but not the dorsum, is connected narrowly on the costa and along the fold with a second, which is larger and extends nearly to the middle of the wing but does not cross the fold, this is also narrowly connected along the costa with a smaller costal patch at two-thirds from the base, a few dark fuscous scales lying at the end of the cell below it. The hindwings are pale shining grey.
