= Chionodes flavipalpella =

Scientific classification
- Kingdom: Animalia
- Phylum: Arthropoda
- Clade: Pancrustacea
- Class: Insecta
- Order: Lepidoptera
- Family: Gelechiidae
- Genus: Chionodes
- Species: C. flavipalpella

Binomial name
- Chionodes flavipalpella Huemer & Sattler, 1995

Species of moth

Chionodes flavipalpella is a moth in the family Gelechiidae. It is found in Russia.
