= Chionodes ludio =

Scientific classification
- Kingdom: Animalia
- Phylum: Arthropoda
- Clade: Pancrustacea
- Class: Insecta
- Order: Lepidoptera
- Family: Gelechiidae
- Genus: Chionodes
- Species: C. ludio

Binomial name
- Chionodes ludio Hodges, 1999

Species of moth

Chionodes ludio is a moth in the family Gelechiidae. It is found in North America, where it has been recorded from New Jersey.

The larvae feed on Quercus ilicifolia.
