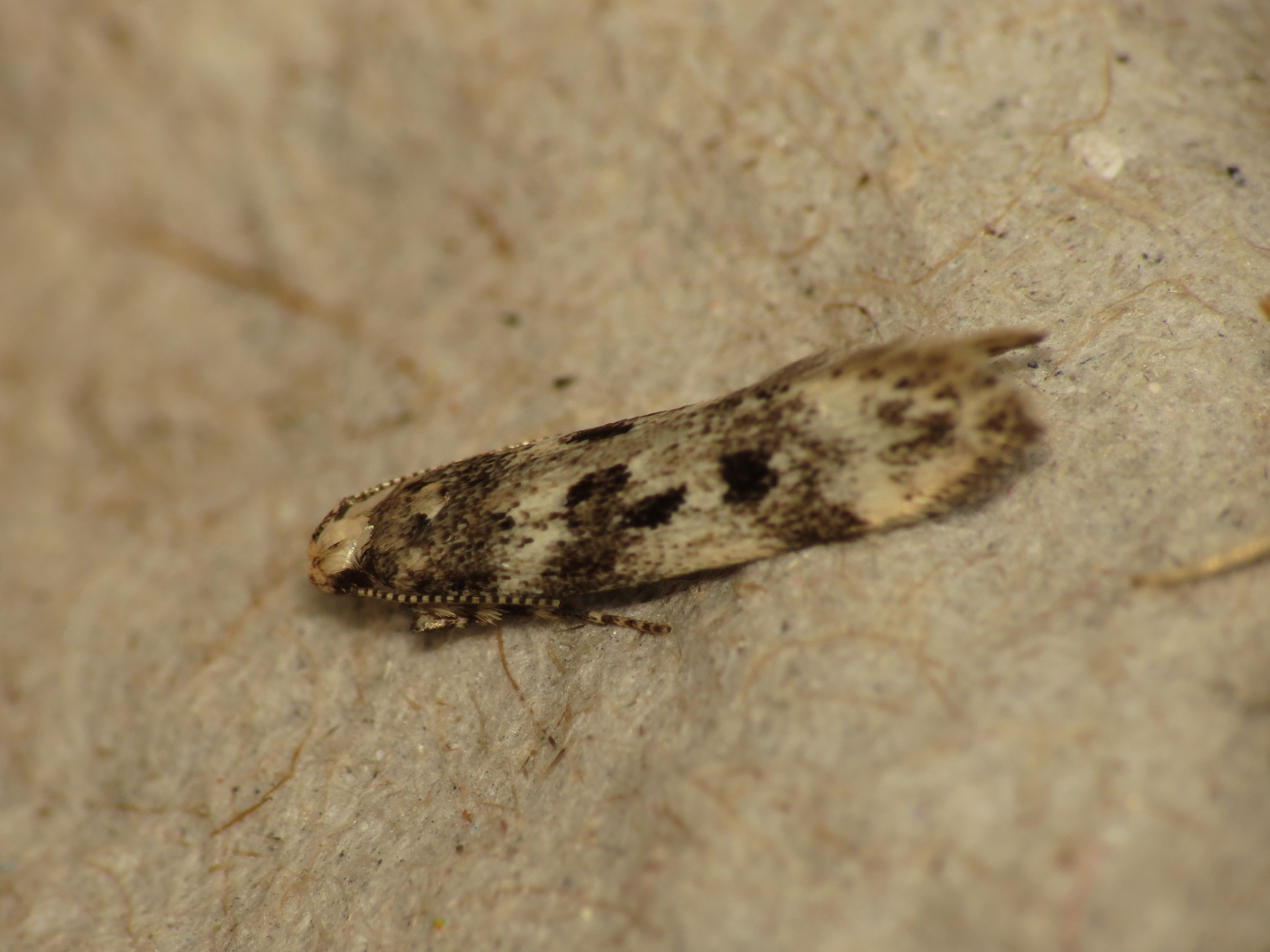
- Chionodes electella

Scientific classification
- Domain: Eukaryota
- Kingdom: Animalia
- Phylum: Arthropoda
- Class: Insecta
- Order: Lepidoptera
- Family: Gelechiidae
- Tribe: Gelechiini
- Genus: Chionodes; Hübner, 1825

Species
- See text.

Synonyms
- Chionoda Hübner, [1826]; Oxycryptis Meyrick, 1912

= Chionodes =

Genus of moths

Chionodes is a genus of moths of the family Gelechiidae. It is distributed throughout much of the world. The larvae of many species use the Douglas fir as a host plant.

== Species ==
- The formosella species-group
  - Chionodes formosella-complex
    - Chionodes abitus Hodges, 1999
    - Chionodes argentipunctella (Ely, 1910)
    - Chionodes bicostomaculella (Chambers, 1872)
    - Chionodes formosella (Murtfeldt, 1881)
    - Chionodes fuscomaculella (Chambers, 1872)
    - Chionodes hapsus Hodges, 1999
    - Chionodes iridescens Clarke, 1947
    - Chionodes percultor Hodges, 1999
    - Chionodes powelli Hodges, 1999
    - Chionodes suasor Hodges, 1999
  - Chionodes gilvomaculella-complex
    - Chionodes abavus Hodges, 1999
    - Chionodes cacula Hodges, 1999
    - Chionodes drapeta Hodges, 1999
    - Chionodes emptor Hodges, 1999
    - Chionodes esor Hodges, 1999
    - Chionodes gilvomaculella (Clemens, 1863)
    - Chionodes rabula Hodges, 1999
  - Chionodes franclemonti-complex
    - Chionodes franclemonti Hodges, 1999
    - Chionodes tarmes Hodges, 1999
  - Chionodes lophosella-complex
    - Chionodes lophosella (Busck, 1910)
    - Chionodes nanodella (Busck, 1910)
  - Chionodes abella-complex
    - Chionodes abella (Busck, 1903)
    - Chionodes davisi Hodges, 1999
    - Chionodes delitor Hodges, 1999
    - Chionodes donahueorum Hodges, 1999
    - Chionodes imber Hodges, 1999
    - Chionodes johnstoni Clarke, 1947
    - Chionodes lactans Hodges, 1999
    - Chionodes meddix Hodges, 1999
    - Chionodes munifex Hodges, 1999
    - Chionodes naevus Hodges, 1999
    - Chionodes nitor Hodges, 1999
    - Chionodes obex Hodges, 1999
    - Chionodes pacator Hodges, 1999
    - Chionodes pavor Hodges, 1999
    - Chionodes periculella (Busck, 1910)
    - Chionodes pulvis Hodges, 1999
    - Chionodes rector Hodges, 1999
    - Chionodes regens Hodges, 1999
    - Chionodes sabinianae Powell, 1959
    - Chionodes sanator Hodges, 1999
    - Chionodes sannio Hodges, 1999
    - Chionodes stator Hodges, 1999
    - Chionodes tessa Clarke, 1947
    - Chionodes volo Hodges, 1999
  - Chionodes sistrella-complex
    - Chionodes abdominella (Busck, 1903)
    - Chionodes cibus Hodges, 1999
    - Chionodes dentella (Busck, 1903)
    - Chionodes fructuarius (Braun, 1925)
    - Chionodes hodgesorum Metzler, 2014
    - Chionodes kincaidella (Busck, 1907)
    - Chionodes lacticoma (Meyrick, 1917)
    - Chionodes landryi Hodges, 1999
    - Chionodes macor Hodges, 1999
    - Chionodes nepos Hodges, 1999
    - Chionodes oecus Hodges, 1999
    - Chionodes paean Hodges, 1999
    - Chionodes pinguicula (Meyrick, 1929)
    - Chionodes plutor Hodges, 1999
    - Chionodes procus Hodges, 1999
    - Chionodes repertor Hodges, 1999
    - Chionodes sistrella (Busck, 1903)
    - Chionodes thyotes Hodges, 1999
    - Chionodes xanthophilella (Barnes & Busck, 1920)
  - Chionodes dammersi-complex
    - Chionodes bardus Hodges, 1999
    - Chionodes dammersi (Keifer, 1936)
    - Chionodes helicosticta (Meyrick, 1929)
    - Chionodes luteogeminatus (Clarke, 1935)
    - Chionodes morus Hodges, 1999
    - Chionodes notandella (Busck, 1916)
    - Chionodes ochreostrigella (Chambers, 1875)
    - Chionodes paralogella (Busck, 1916)
    - Chionodes rhombus Hodges, 1999
  - unplaced to complex
    - Chionodes icriodes (Meyrick, 1931)
    - Chionodes litigiosa (Meyrick, 1917)
    - Chionodes pentadora (Meyrick, 1917)
    - Chionodes pleroma (Walsingham, 1911)
    - Chionodes scotodes (Walsingham, 1911)
- The obscurusella species-group
  - Chionodes thoraceochrella-complex
    - Chionodes chrysopyla (Keifer, 1935)
    - Chionodes salicella Sattler, 1967
    - Chionodes thoraceochrella (Chambers, 1872)
  - Chionodes hostis-complex
    - Chionodes hostis Hodges, 1999
    - Chionodes lector Hodges, 1999
  - Chionodes obscurusella-complex
    - Chionodes acerella Sattler, 1967
    - Chionodes metoecus Hodges, 1999
    - Chionodes obscurusella (Chambers, 1872)
  - Chionodes occidentella-complex
    - Chionodes dryobathra (Meyrick, 1917)
    - Chionodes fremor Hodges, 1999
    - Chionodes lusor Hodges, 1999
    - Chionodes mediofuscella (Clemens, 1863)
    - Chionodes occidentella (Chambers, 1875)
    - Chionodes soter Hodges, 1999
  - Chionodes terminimaculella-complex
    - Chionodes terminimaculella (Kearfott, 1908)
  - Chionodes erro-complex
    - Chionodes erro Hodges, 1999
  - Chionodes trichostola-complex
    - Chionodes parens Hodges, 1999
    - Chionodes trichostola (Meyrick, 1923)
    - Chionodes sevir Hodges, 1999
  - Chionodes acrina-complex
    - Chionodes acrina (Keifer, 1933)
    - Chionodes adam Hodges, 1999
    - Chionodes altor Hodges, 1999
  - Chionodes concinna-complex
    - Chionodes cautor Hodges, 1999
    - Chionodes concinna (Walsingham, 1911)
  - Chionodes irreptor-complex
    - Chionodes irreptor Hodges, 1999
  - Chionodes baro-complex
    - Chionodes baro Hodges, 1999
    - Chionodes secutor Hodges, 1999
  - Chionodes trophella-complex
    - Chionodes restio Hodges, 1999
    - Chionodes trophella (Busck, 1903)
  - Chionodes pinax-complex
    - Chionodes pinax Hodges, 1999
  - Chionodes adamas-complex
    - Chionodes adamas Hodges, 1999
    - Chionodes creberrima (Walsingham, 1911)
    - Chionodes ludio Hodges, 1999
    - Chionodes messor Hodges, 1999
    - Chionodes nubis Hodges, 1999
    - Chionodes optio Hodges, 1999
    - Chionodes pastor Hodges, 1999
  - Chionodes magirus-complex
    - Chionodes magirus Hodges, 1999
  - Chionodes innox-complex
    - Chionodes gestor Hodges, 1999
    - Chionodes innox Hodges, 1999
  - Chionodes fondella-complex
    - Chionodes fondella (Busck, 1906)
    - Chionodes pseudofondella (Busck, 1908)
  - Chionodes bibo-complex
    - Chionodes bibo Hodges, 1999
  - Chionodes pereyra-complex
    - Chionodes pereyra Clarke, 1947
    - Chionodes petalumensis Clarke, 1947
  - unplaced to complex
    - Chionodes bufo (Walsingham, 1911)
    - Chionodes cacoderma (Walsingham, 1911)
    - Chionodes neptica (Walsingham, 1911)
- The phalacrus species-group
  - Chionodes argosema (Meyrick, 1917)
  - Chionodes consona (Meyrick, 1917)
  - Chionodes donatella (Walker, 1864)
  - Chionodes eburata (Meyrick, 1917)
  - Chionodes mariona (Heinrich, 1921)
  - Chionodes petro Hodges, 1999
  - Chionodes phalacra (Walsingham, 1911)
  - Chionodes popa Hodges, 1999
- The discoocellella species-group
  - Chionodes discoocellella (Chambers, 1872)
  - Chionodes halycopa (Meyrick, 1927)
- The ceryx species-group
  - Chionodes ceryx Hodges, 1999
- The lugubrella species-group
  - Chionodes lugubrella-complex
    - Chionodes ceanothiella (Busck, 1904)
    - Chionodes kubai Hodges, 1999
    - Chionodes lugubrella (Fabricius, 1794)
    - Chionodes obelus Hodges, 1999
  - Chionodes hibiscella-complex
    - Chionodes aruns Hodges, 1999
    - Chionodes bios Hodges, 1999
    - Chionodes canofusella Clarke, 1947
    - Chionodes chlorocephala (Meyrick, 1932)
    - Chionodes hibiscella (Busck, 1903)
    - Chionodes salva (Meyrick, 1925)
  - Chionodes retiniella-complex
    - Chionodes elainae Hodges, 1999
    - Chionodes luror Hodges, 1999
    - Chionodes retiniella (Barnes & Busck, 1920)
  - Chionodes tragicella-complex
    - Chionodes arenella (Forbes, 1922)
    - Chionodes aristella (Busck, 1903)
    - Chionodes dolo Hodges, 1999
    - Chionodes factor Hodges, 1999
    - Chionodes figurella (Busck, 1912)
    - Chionodes grandis Clarke, 1947
    - Chionodes hospes Hodges, 1999
    - Chionodes pallor Hodges, 1999
    - Chionodes soella Huemer & Sattler, 1995
    - Chionodes tragicella (Heyden, 1865)
  - Chionodes luctuella-complex
    - Chionodes aprilella Huemer & Sattler, 1995
    - Chionodes luctuella (Hübner, 1793)
    - Chionodes rectifex Hodges, 1999
  - Chionodes holosericella-complex
    - Chionodes agriodes (Meyrick, 1927)
    - Chionodes aleo Hodges, 1999
    - Chionodes bicolor Clarke, 1947
    - Chionodes boreas Hodges, 1999
    - Chionodes caucasiella Huemer & Sattler, 1995
    - Chionodes cusor Hodges, 1999
    - Chionodes dator Hodges, 1999
    - Chionodes fimus Hodges, 1999
    - Chionodes flavipalpella Huemer & Sattler, 1995
    - Chionodes gratus Hodges, 1999
    - Chionodes holosericella (Herrich-Schäffer, 1854)
    - Chionodes mikkolai Hodges, 1999
    - Chionodes molitor Hodges, 1999
    - Chionodes mongolica Piskunov, 1979
    - Chionodes occlusa (Braun, 1925)
    - Chionodes praeclarella (Herrich-Schäffer, 1854)
    - Chionodes praeco Hodges, 1999
    - Chionodes psiloptera (Barnes & Busck, 1920)
    - Chionodes rogator Hodges, 1999
    - Chionodes rupex Hodges, 1999
    - Chionodes senica Hodges, 1999
    - Chionodes sponsus Hodges, 1999
    - Chionodes tannuolella (Rebel, 1917)
    - Chionodes trico Hodges, 1999
    - Chionodes ustor Hodges, 1999
    - Chionodes veles Hodges, 1999
    - Chionodes violacea (Tengström, 1848)
    - Chionodes whitmanella Clarke, 1942
  - Chionodes theurgis-complex
    - Chionodes gerdius Hodges, 1999
    - Chionodes theurgis Hodges, 1999
    - Chionodes tributor Hodges, 1999
  - Chionodes distinctella-complex
    - Chionodes apolectella (Walsingham, 1900)
    - Chionodes bastuliella (Rebel, 1931)
    - Chionodes canor Hodges, 1999
    - Chionodes continuella (Zeller, 1839)
    - Chionodes distinctella (Zeller, 1839)
    - Chionodes ensis Hodges, 1999
    - Chionodes ermolaevi Bidzilya, 2012
    - Chionodes fictor Hodges, 1999
    - Chionodes frigidella Huemer & Sattler, 1995
    - Chionodes hayreddini Koçak, 1986
    - Chionodes hinnella (Rebel, 1935)
    - Chionodes histon Hodges, 1999
    - Chionodes latro Hodges, 1999
    - Chionodes lictor Hodges, 1999
    - Chionodes metallicus (Braun, 1921)
    - Chionodes nigrobarbata (Braun, 1925)
    - Chionodes nubilella (Zetterstedt, 1839)
    - Chionodes offectus Hodges, 1999
    - Chionodes perpetuella (Herrich-Schäffer, 1854)
    - Chionodes praecia Hodges, 1999
    - Chionodes praetor Hodges, 1999
    - Chionodes sattleri Hodges, 1999
    - Chionodes sepultor Hodges, 1999
    - Chionodes viduella (Fabricius, 1794)
  - Chionodes braunella-complex
    - Chionodes braunella (Keifer, 1931)
  - Chionodes impes-complex
    - Chionodes impes Hodges, 1999
  - Chionodes fumatella-complex
    - Chionodes clarkei Hodges, 1999
    - Chionodes electella (Zeller, 1839)
    - Chionodes flavicorporella (Walsingham, 1882)
    - Chionodes fumatella (Douglas, 1850)
    - Chionodes ignorantella (Herrich-Schäffer, 1854)
    - Chionodes nebulosella (Heinemann, 1870)
    - Chionodes permacta (Braun, 1925)
    - Chionodes sagayica (Koçak, 1986)
    - Chionodes tantella Huemer & Sattler, 1995
- unnamed species-group
  - Chionodes attonita (Meyrick, 1912)
  - Chionodes borzella Bidzilya, 2000
  - Chionodes caespitella (Zeller, 1877)
  - Chionodes cerussata (Walsingham, 1911)
  - Chionodes manabiensis Schmitz & Landry, 2007
  - Chionodes meridiochilensis King & Montesinos, 2012
  - Chionodes nephelophracta (Meyrick, 1932)
  - Chionodes perissosema (Meyrick, 1932)
  - Chionodes spirodoxa (Meyrick, 1931)
  - Chionodes stefaniae Schmitz & Landry, 2007
  - Chionodes tundra Bidzilya, 2012
  - Chionodes xylobathra (Meyrick, 1936)

== Status unclear ==
- Chionodes decolorella (Heinemann, 1870), described as Gelechia decolorella and recorded from Austria and Serbia
- Chionodes decolorella ab. colorella (Caradja, 1920), described as Gelechia decolorella ab. colorella and recorded from the Alai Mountains
