= Chionodes scotodes =

Scientific classification
- Kingdom: Animalia
- Phylum: Arthropoda
- Clade: Pancrustacea
- Class: Insecta
- Order: Lepidoptera
- Family: Gelechiidae
- Genus: Chionodes
- Species: C. scotodes

Binomial name
- Chionodes scotodes (Walsingham, 1911)

Synonyms
- Gelechia scotodes Walsingham, 1911

Species of moth

Chionodes scotodes is a moth in the family Gelechiidae. It is found in Sonora, Mexico.
