= Chionodes psiloptera =

Scientific classification
- Kingdom: Animalia
- Phylum: Arthropoda
- Clade: Pancrustacea
- Class: Insecta
- Order: Lepidoptera
- Family: Gelechiidae
- Genus: Chionodes
- Species: C. psiloptera

Binomial name
- Chionodes psiloptera (Barnes & Busck, 1920)

Synonyms
- Gelechia psiloptera Barnes & Busck, 1920; Gelechia abradescens Braun, 1921

Species of moth

Chionodes psiloptera is a moth in the family Gelechiidae first described by William Barnes and August Busck in 1920. It is found in North America, where it has been recorded from Quebec to British Columbia and then to Alaska, eastern Washington, Montana and New York.

The wingspan is 16–17 mm. The forewings are shiny blackish brown, nearly black with black tipped, closely applied scales with light yellow bases. There is a small indistinct and diffused yellowish costal spot at the apical third, and an inconspicuous purplish-black spot at the end of the cell, another on the middle of the cell and a third below this latter on the fold. The hindwings are dark fuscous.

The larvae feed on Poa pratensis.
