= Chionodes dentella =

Scientific classification
- Kingdom: Animalia
- Phylum: Arthropoda
- Clade: Pancrustacea
- Class: Insecta
- Order: Lepidoptera
- Family: Gelechiidae
- Genus: Chionodes
- Species: C. dentella

Binomial name
- Chionodes dentella (Busck, 1903)

Synonyms
- Gelechia dentella Busck, 1903

Species of moth

Chionodes dentella is a moth in the family Gelechiidae. It is found in North America, where it has been recorded from Texas, New Mexico, Nevada, Arizona, California, Mississippi and Florida.

The wingspan is 9–10 mm. The forewings are black and yellowish white, with the costal half from the base to the apical two-fifths black, and the entire apical two-fifths black except for two small opposite costal and dorsal spots, which are yellowish white. The dorsal half of the wing from the base to the apical two-fifths is yellowish white. The white part projects upward at the apical two-fifths to the costal edge and has another slight projection into the costal black part at the basal third of the wing. The hindwings are light yellowish grey.
