= Chionodes imber =

Scientific classification
- Kingdom: Animalia
- Phylum: Arthropoda
- Clade: Pancrustacea
- Class: Insecta
- Order: Lepidoptera
- Family: Gelechiidae
- Genus: Chionodes
- Species: C. imber

Binomial name
- Chionodes imber Hodges, 1999

Species of moth

Chionodes imber is a moth in the family Gelechiidae (twirler moths). C. imber is found in North America, where it has been recorded from southern Ontario and Massachusetts to Arizona, Texas, Florida and Idaho. C. Imber was discovered by Hodges, 1999 and the larvae of C. Imber feed on Myrica aspleniifolia.
