= Chionodes consona =

Scientific classification
- Kingdom: Animalia
- Phylum: Arthropoda
- Clade: Pancrustacea
- Class: Insecta
- Order: Lepidoptera
- Family: Gelechiidae
- Genus: Chionodes
- Species: C. consona

Binomial name
- Chionodes consona (Meyrick, 1917)

Synonyms
- Gelechia consona Meyrick, 1917

Species of moth

Chionodes consona is a moth in the family Gelechiidae. It is found in Peru.

The wingspan is about 13 mm. The forewings are dark purplish-fuscous with a thick white streak along the dorsum from the base to three-fourths, irregularly terminated and uniting with a roundish white spot in the disc beyond the middle of the wing. There is also a roundish white spot on the costa at three-fourths. The hindwings are grey.
