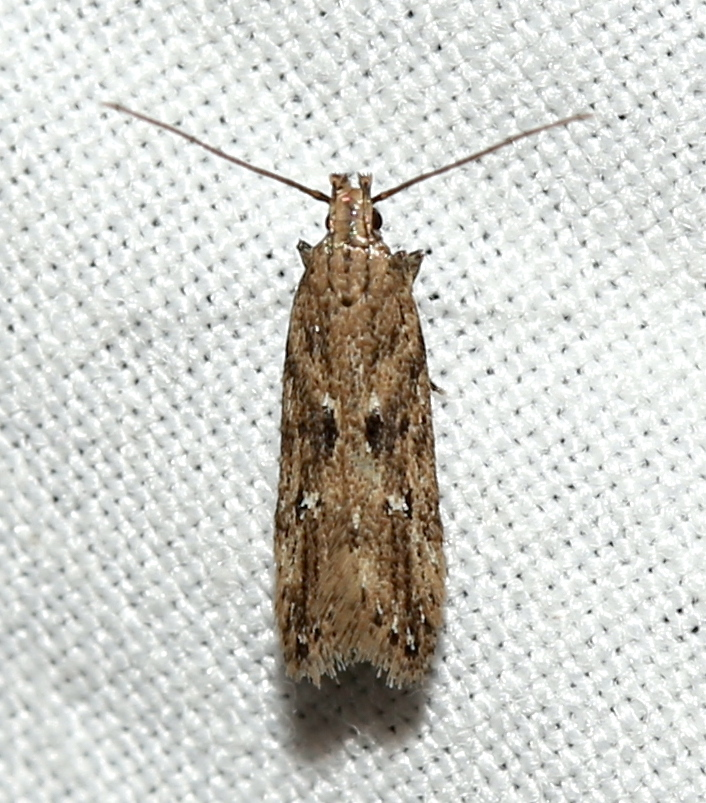

Scientific classification
- Kingdom: Animalia
- Phylum: Arthropoda
- Clade: Pancrustacea
- Class: Insecta
- Order: Lepidoptera
- Family: Gelechiidae
- Genus: Chionodes
- Species: C. rabula

Binomial name
- Chionodes rabula Hodges, 1999

= Chionodes rabula =

Species of moth

Chionodes rabula is a moth in the family Gelechiidae. It is found in North America, where it has been recorded from Ontario and New Jersey to Florida, including Alabama, Maryland, Mississippi, North Carolina, South Carolina, Ohio and Louisiana.

The larvae feed on Typha angustifolia.
