= Chionodes aprilella =

Scientific classification
- Kingdom: Animalia
- Phylum: Arthropoda
- Clade: Pancrustacea
- Class: Insecta
- Order: Lepidoptera
- Family: Gelechiidae
- Genus: Chionodes
- Species: C. aprilella

Binomial name
- Chionodes aprilella Huemer & Sattler, 1995

Species of moth

Chionodes aprilella is a moth of the family Gelechiidae. It is found in Russia (southern Ural, Altai Mountains, southern Buryatia, Transbaikal).
