= Chionodes optio =

Scientific classification
- Kingdom: Animalia
- Phylum: Arthropoda
- Clade: Pancrustacea
- Class: Insecta
- Order: Lepidoptera
- Family: Gelechiidae
- Genus: Chionodes
- Species: C. optio

Binomial name
- Chionodes optio Hodges, 1999

Species of moth

Chionodes optio is a moth in the family Gelechiidae. It is found in North America, where it has been recorded from Colorado, Texas, New Mexico, Arizona and California.

The larvae are leaf tiers on Quercus arizonica.
