= Chionodes ensis =

Scientific classification
- Kingdom: Animalia
- Phylum: Arthropoda
- Clade: Pancrustacea
- Class: Insecta
- Order: Lepidoptera
- Family: Gelechiidae
- Genus: Chionodes
- Species: C. ensis

Binomial name
- Chionodes ensis Hodges, 1999

Species of moth

Chionodes ensis is a moth in the family Gelechiidae. It is found in North America, where it has been recorded from Utah, Colorado, Alberta and the Northwest Territories.
