= Chionodes canofusella =

Scientific classification
- Kingdom: Animalia
- Phylum: Arthropoda
- Clade: Pancrustacea
- Class: Insecta
- Order: Lepidoptera
- Family: Gelechiidae
- Genus: Chionodes
- Species: C. canofusella

Binomial name
- Chionodes canofusella Clarke, 1947

Species of insect

Chionodes canofusella is a moth in the family Gelechiidae. It is found in North America, where it has been recorded from southern Texas.

The wingspan is 14–16 mm. The forewings are blackish fuscous in the costal area, while the remainder of the wing is ochreous white overlaid in the apical half with ochreous and with a narrow, irregular, longitudinal brown line between the light dorsal portion and the dark costal portion of the wing. There is a row of small, blackish-fuscous spots around the termen to the tornus. There is also a narrow, brown, transverse dash at the apical third on the costa, extending to the light area of the wing. The hindwings are shining grey basally, shading to dark fuscous at the apex.

The larvae feed on Abutilon pedunculare.
