= Chionodes meridiochilensis =

Scientific classification
- Kingdom: Animalia
- Phylum: Arthropoda
- Clade: Pancrustacea
- Class: Insecta
- Order: Lepidoptera
- Family: Gelechiidae
- Genus: Chionodes
- Species: C. meridiochilensis

Binomial name
- Chionodes meridiochilensis King & Montesinos, 2012

Species of moth

Chionodes meridiochilensis is a moth in the family Gelechiidae. It is found in southern Chile.

The length of the forewings is about 9.9 mm.
