= Chionodes phalacra =

Scientific classification
- Kingdom: Animalia
- Phylum: Arthropoda
- Clade: Pancrustacea
- Class: Insecta
- Order: Lepidoptera
- Family: Gelechiidae
- Genus: Chionodes
- Species: C. phalacra

Binomial name
- Chionodes phalacra (Walsingham, 1911)

Synonyms
- Gelechia phalacra Walsingham, 1911

Species of moth

Chionodes phalacra is a moth in the family Gelechiidae. It is found in North America, where it has been recorded from Texas, Arizona and Mexico. It has also been recorded from Cuba.

The wingspan is about 9 mm. The forewings are dark fuscous, with a slender streak of pale cream-colour from the base along the margin to the flexus. A small costal spot, at the commencement of the cilia, is preceded by a larger dorsal spot, both pale cream-colour. There is a minute spot of the same colour on the cell, about the middle of the wing, preceded by another at the apex, and others, along the termen, are followed by black scales. A similar spot lies on the fold at about its middle. The hindwings are pale greyish cinereous.
