= Chionodes cerussata =

Scientific classification
- Kingdom: Animalia
- Phylum: Arthropoda
- Clade: Pancrustacea
- Class: Insecta
- Order: Lepidoptera
- Family: Gelechiidae
- Genus: Chionodes
- Species: C. cerussata

Binomial name
- Chionodes cerussata (Walsingham, 1911)

Synonyms
- Gelechia cerussata Walsingham, 1911; Friseria cerussata

Species of moth

Chionodes cerussata is a moth in the family Gelechiidae. It is found in Mexico (Vera Cruz).

The wingspan is about 14 mm. The forewings are dark purplish fuscous, with a very narrow, pale cream-ochreous, straight, transverse band at the extreme base, and an elongate-ovate white patch, sparsely dusted with fuscous, occupying the tornus and termen, with the cilia, to below the apex, near which it encloses a dark fuscous dot. The cilia at the extreme apex and above it is smoky fuscous and a blackish dot occurs on the disc, above the middle, at scarcely one-half from the base. The hindwings are grey.
