= Chionodes borzella =

Scientific classification
- Kingdom: Animalia
- Phylum: Arthropoda
- Clade: Pancrustacea
- Class: Insecta
- Order: Lepidoptera
- Family: Gelechiidae
- Genus: Chionodes
- Species: C. borzella

Binomial name
- Chionodes borzella Bidzilya, 2000

Species of moth

Chionodes borzella is a moth in the family Gelechiidae. It is found in the Russian Far East, where it has been recorded from the Chita region.
