= Chionodes pinax =

Scientific classification
- Kingdom: Animalia
- Phylum: Arthropoda
- Clade: Pancrustacea
- Class: Insecta
- Order: Lepidoptera
- Family: Gelechiidae
- Genus: Chionodes
- Species: C. pinax

Binomial name
- Chionodes pinax Hodges, 1999

Species of moth

Chionodes pinax is a moth in the family Gelechiidae. It is found in North America, where it has been recorded from southern British Columbia, Montana and Arizona.

The larvae feed on Pinus contorta and the male flowers of Pinus ponderosa.
