= Chionodes clarkei =

Scientific classification
- Kingdom: Animalia
- Phylum: Arthropoda
- Clade: Pancrustacea
- Class: Insecta
- Order: Lepidoptera
- Family: Gelechiidae
- Genus: Chionodes
- Species: C. clarkei

Binomial name
- Chionodes clarkei Hodges, 1999

Species of moth

Chionodes clarkei is a moth in the family Gelechiidae. It is found in North America, where it has been recorded from Oregon and northern Washington.
