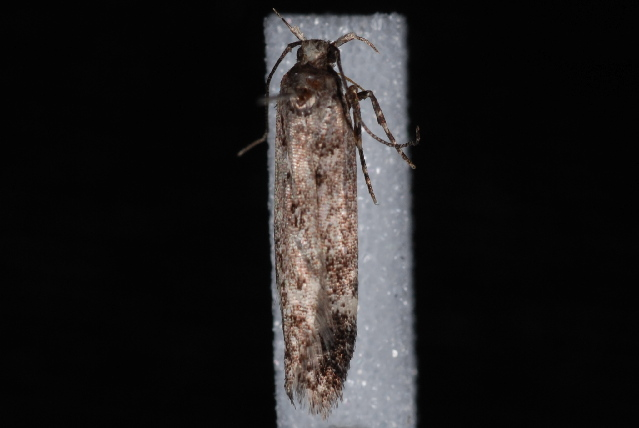

Scientific classification
- Kingdom: Animalia
- Phylum: Arthropoda
- Clade: Pancrustacea
- Class: Insecta
- Order: Lepidoptera
- Family: Gelechiidae
- Genus: Chionodes
- Species: C. fictor

Binomial name
- Chionodes fictor Hodges, 1999

= Chionodes fictor =

Species of moth

Chionodes fictor is a moth in the family Gelechiidae. It is found in North America, where it has been recorded from Alaska, British Columbia and the Northwest Territories.
