= Chionodes dryobathra =

Scientific classification
- Kingdom: Animalia
- Phylum: Arthropoda
- Clade: Pancrustacea
- Class: Insecta
- Order: Lepidoptera
- Family: Gelechiidae
- Genus: Chionodes
- Species: C. dryobathra

Binomial name
- Chionodes dryobathra (Meyrick, 1917)

Synonyms
- Gelechia dryobathra Meyrick, 1917

Species of moth

Chionodes dryobathra is a moth in the family Gelechiidae. It is found in Colombia.

The wingspan is 13–14 millimetres (0.51–0.55 in). The forewings are dark fuscous with a brown basal patch occupying about one-fourth of the wing, the edge irregularly curved or bent. The stigmata are blackish, approximated, with the plical somewhat obliquely before the first discal. There is a small pale brownish spot on the costa at three-fourths. The hindwings are grey.
