= Chionodes halycopa =

Scientific classification
- Kingdom: Animalia
- Phylum: Arthropoda
- Clade: Pancrustacea
- Class: Insecta
- Order: Lepidoptera
- Family: Gelechiidae
- Genus: Chionodes
- Species: C. halycopa

Binomial name
- Chionodes halycopa (Meyrick, 1927)

Synonyms
- Gelechia halycopa Meyrick, 1927

Species of moth

Chionodes halycopa is a moth in the family Gelechiidae. It is found in North America, where it has been recorded from Texas.

The wingspan is about 19 mm for males and 17 mm for females. The forewings are dark purplish-fuscous, rather lighter and bronzy-tinged towards the termen. The stigmata are moderately large, blackish-fuscous, edged laterally whitish, with the plical obliquely before the first discal. The hindwings are light grey.
