= Chionodes pentadora =

Scientific classification
- Kingdom: Animalia
- Phylum: Arthropoda
- Clade: Pancrustacea
- Class: Insecta
- Order: Lepidoptera
- Family: Gelechiidae
- Genus: Chionodes
- Species: C. pentadora

Binomial name
- Chionodes pentadora (Meyrick, 1917)

Synonyms
- Gelechia pentadora Meyrick, 1917

Species of moth

Chionodes pentadora is a moth in the family Gelechiidae. It is found in French Guiana.

The wingspan is 12–14 mm. The forewings are dark purple-fuscous with yellow markings. There is a slightly oblique oval transverse blotch from the costa at one-fourth reaching three-fourths across the wing. There is also a spot beneath the middle of the disc and an irregular inwardly oblique transverse blotch from the costa at two-thirds, reaching more than half across the wing. There is also a spot on the tornus and a small spot before the apex. The hindwings are dark grey.
