= Chionodes sagayica =

Scientific classification
- Kingdom: Animalia
- Phylum: Arthropoda
- Clade: Pancrustacea
- Class: Insecta
- Order: Lepidoptera
- Family: Gelechiidae
- Genus: Chionodes
- Species: C. sagayica

Binomial name
- Chionodes sagayica (Koçak, 1986)

Synonyms
- Gelechia sagayica Koçak, 1986

Species of moth

Chionodes sagayica is a moth in the family Gelechiidae. It is found in Russia. The Global Lepidoptera Names Index has this species as a synonym of Chionodes fumatella.
