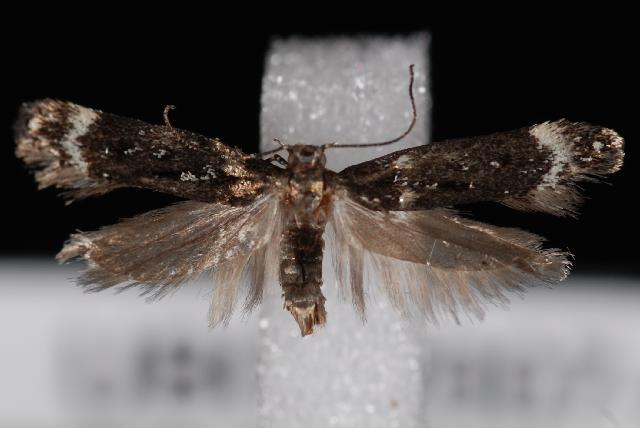

Scientific classification
- Kingdom: Animalia
- Phylum: Arthropoda
- Clade: Pancrustacea
- Class: Insecta
- Order: Lepidoptera
- Family: Gelechiidae
- Genus: Chionodes
- Species: C. periculella

Binomial name
- Chionodes periculella (Busck, 1910)

Synonyms
- Gelechia periculella Busck, 1910

= Chionodes periculella =

Species of moth

Chionodes periculella is a moth in the family Gelechiidae. It is found in North America, where it has been recorded from British Columbia, Washington, California and Oregon.

The wingspan is about 22 mm. The forewings are brownish black with a purple sheen and with a few scattered white scales. At apical fourth is a white zigzag line. The hindwings are dark fuscous.

The larvae feed on Pinus ponderosa and Pseudotsuga menziesii.
