= Chionodes litigiosa =

Scientific classification
- Kingdom: Animalia
- Phylum: Arthropoda
- Clade: Pancrustacea
- Class: Insecta
- Order: Lepidoptera
- Family: Gelechiidae
- Genus: Chionodes
- Species: C. litigiosa

Binomial name
- Chionodes litigiosa (Meyrick, 1917)

Synonyms
- Gelechia litigiosa Meyrick, 1917

Species of moth

Chionodes litigiosa is a moth in the family Gelechiidae. It is found in Ecuador.

The wingspan is 11–13 mm. The forewings are dark fuscous, variably irrorated with whitish-fuscous or whitish-ochreous. The stigmata are cloudy, blackish, with the plical slightly before the first discal and with a small cloudy pale ochreous or whitish-ochreous spot on the costa at three-fourths. The hindwings are grey.
