= Chionodes donatella =

Scientific classification
- Kingdom: Animalia
- Phylum: Arthropoda
- Clade: Pancrustacea
- Class: Insecta
- Order: Lepidoptera
- Family: Gelechiidae
- Genus: Chionodes
- Species: C. donatella

Binomial name
- Chionodes donatella (Walker, 1864)

Synonyms
- Gelechia donatella Walker, 1864; Stegasta donatella Walker, 1864

Species of moth

Chionodes donatella is a moth in the family Gelechiidae. It is found in Florida, Jamaica and Cuba.

Adults are cupreous-brown, the forewings with two white spots, the first on the costa at three-fourths and the second on the interior border beyond the middle. The hindwings are a little paler.
