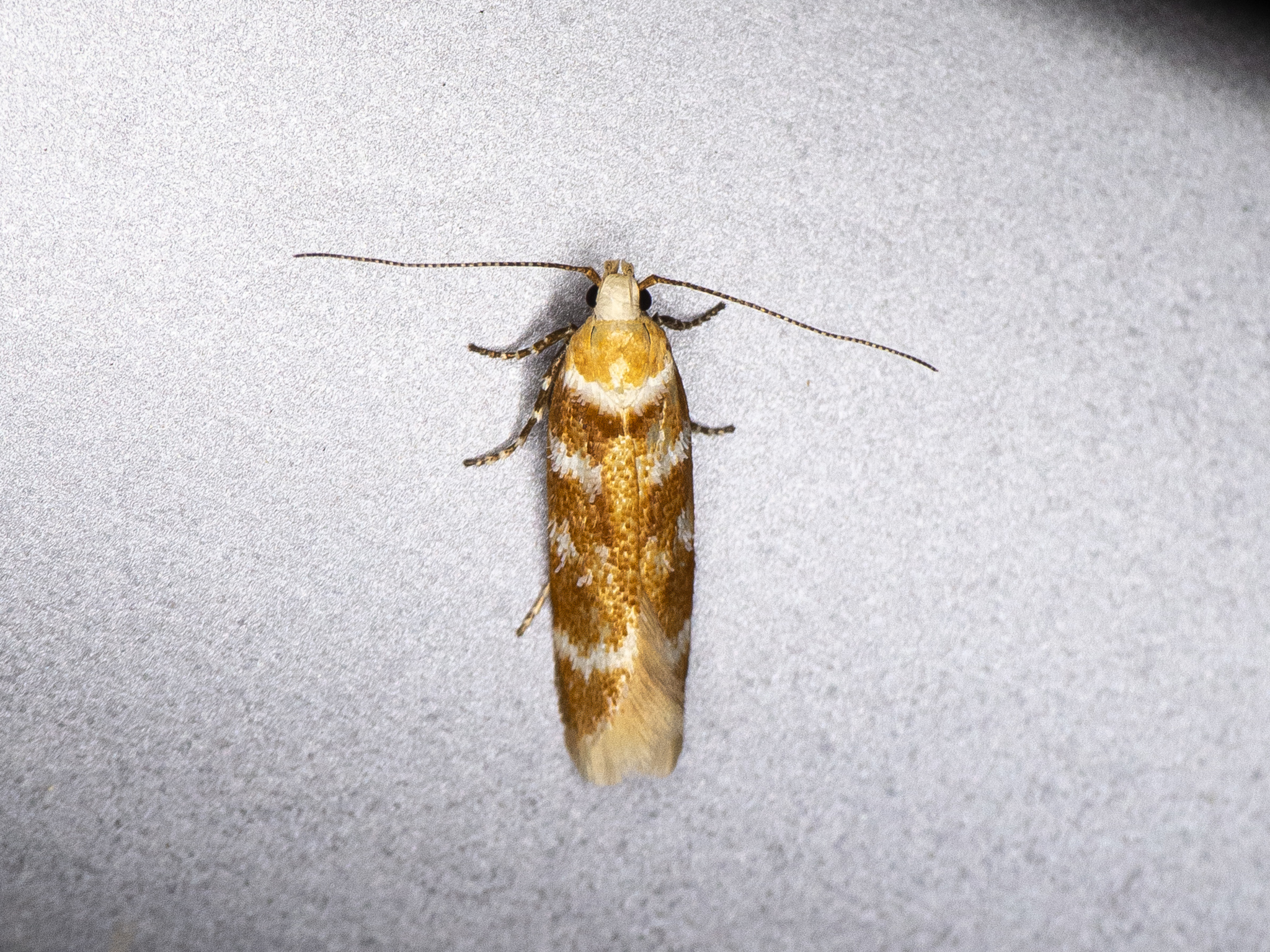

Scientific classification
- Kingdom: Animalia
- Phylum: Arthropoda
- Clade: Pancrustacea
- Class: Insecta
- Order: Lepidoptera
- Family: Gelechiidae
- Genus: Chionodes
- Species: C. retiniella

Binomial name
- Chionodes retiniella (Barnes & Busck, 1920)

Synonyms
- Gelechia retiniella Barnes & Busck, 1920; Gelechia langei Keifer, 1936

= Chionodes retiniella =

Species of moth

Chionodes retiniella is a species of moth in the family Gelechiidae. It is first described by William Barnes and August Busck in 1920. It is found in North America, where it has been recorded from Idaho, Wyoming, Nevada, British Columbia, Washington, Colorado, New Mexico, Arizona and California.

== Description ==
The wingspan is 18–21 mm. The forewings are white, heavily overlaid with light ocherous scales, which only leaves the white ground color exposed on a very diffused outwardly oblique fascia from the basal fourth of the costa to the basal third of the dorsum, on a similarly ill-defined transverse fascia across the middle of the wing and on a somewhat better defined transverse fascia at apical fourth. The hindwings are silvery fuscous.

The larvae feed on Pinus ponderosa, Pinus sabiniana and Tsuga heterophylla.
