= Chionodes occlusa =

Scientific classification
- Kingdom: Animalia
- Phylum: Arthropoda
- Clade: Pancrustacea
- Class: Insecta
- Order: Lepidoptera
- Family: Gelechiidae
- Genus: Chionodes
- Species: C. occlusa

Binomial name
- Chionodes occlusa (Braun, 1925)

Synonyms
- Gelechia occlusa Braun, 1925

Species of moth

Chionodes occlusa is a moth in the family Gelechiidae. It is found in North America, where it has been recorded from New York, the Northwest Territories, from Ontario to British Columbia and south to Arizona and California.
