= Chionodes spirodoxa =

Scientific classification
- Kingdom: Animalia
- Phylum: Arthropoda
- Clade: Pancrustacea
- Class: Insecta
- Order: Lepidoptera
- Family: Gelechiidae
- Genus: Chionodes
- Species: C. spirodoxa

Binomial name
- Chionodes spirodoxa (Meyrick, 1931)

Synonyms
- Gelechia spirodoxa Meyrick, 1931

Species of moth

Chionodes spirodoxa is a moth in the family Gelechiidae. It is found in Brazil.
