= Chionodes abdominella =

Scientific classification
- Kingdom: Animalia
- Phylum: Arthropoda
- Clade: Pancrustacea
- Class: Insecta
- Order: Lepidoptera
- Family: Gelechiidae
- Genus: Chionodes
- Species: C. abdominella

Binomial name
- Chionodes abdominella (Busck, 1903)

Synonyms
- Gelechia abdominella Busck, 1903

Species of moth

Chionodes abdominella is a moth in the family Gelechiidae. It is found in North America, where it has been recorded from Texas, New Mexico, Arizona, California and Nevada.

The wingspan is 9–10 mm. The forewings are black and white, with the extreme base of the costa black and with a large black triangular costal spot before the middle of the wing, with the tip reaching beyond the fold and with a white central dot on the costa. The apical two-fifths of the wing are black, with a costal and dorsal triangular white spot at the beginning of the cilia nearly or quite reaching each other with their thinly extended tips. The rest of the forewing has two upward projections reaching the costal edge on each side of the costal black triangular spot, white with a faint ochreous tint. The hindwings are light silvery grey.
