= Chionodes rhombus =

Scientific classification
- Kingdom: Animalia
- Phylum: Arthropoda
- Clade: Pancrustacea
- Class: Insecta
- Order: Lepidoptera
- Family: Gelechiidae
- Genus: Chionodes
- Species: C. rhombus

Binomial name
- Chionodes rhombus Hodges, 1999

Species of moth

Chionodes rhombus is a moth in the family Gelechiidae. It is found in North America, where it has been recorded from Arizona, Colorado, Washington, Wyoming, Nebraska, Nevada, New Mexico and California.

The larvae feed on Populus species.
