= Chionodes tannuolella =

Scientific classification
- Kingdom: Animalia
- Phylum: Arthropoda
- Clade: Pancrustacea
- Class: Insecta
- Order: Lepidoptera
- Family: Gelechiidae
- Genus: Chionodes
- Species: C. tannuolella

Binomial name
- Chionodes tannuolella (Rebel, 1917)

Synonyms
- Gelechia tannuolella Rebel, 1917

Species of moth

Chionodes tannuolella is a moth in the family Gelechiidae. It is found in southern Siberia.
