= Chionodes adam =

Scientific classification
- Kingdom: Animalia
- Phylum: Arthropoda
- Clade: Pancrustacea
- Class: Insecta
- Order: Lepidoptera
- Family: Gelechiidae
- Genus: Chionodes
- Species: C. adam

Binomial name
- Chionodes adam Hodges, 1999

Species of moth

Chionodes adam is a moth in the family Gelechiidae. It is found in North America, where it has been recorded from Colorado, Utah, Texas, New Mexico and Arizona.

The wingspan is about 21 mm.
