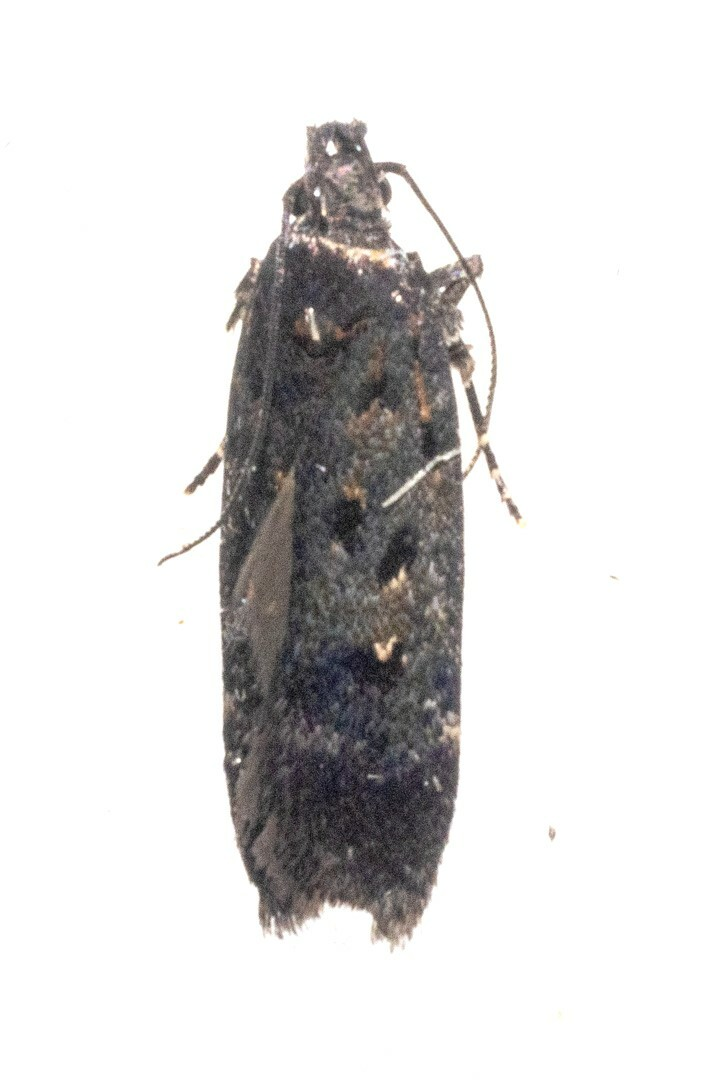

Scientific classification
- Kingdom: Animalia
- Phylum: Arthropoda
- Clade: Pancrustacea
- Class: Insecta
- Order: Lepidoptera
- Family: Gelechiidae
- Genus: Chionodes
- Species: C. tarmes

Binomial name
- Chionodes tarmes Hodges, 1999

= Chionodes tarmes =

Species of moth

Chionodes tarmes is a species of moth in the family Gelechiidae. It is found in North America, where it has been recorded from Michigan, Maine, southern Quebec, Illinois and North Carolina.
