= Chionodes ceryx =

Scientific classification
- Kingdom: Animalia
- Phylum: Arthropoda
- Clade: Pancrustacea
- Class: Insecta
- Order: Lepidoptera
- Family: Gelechiidae
- Genus: Chionodes
- Species: C. ceryx

Binomial name
- Chionodes ceryx Hodges, 1999

Species of moth

Chionodes ceryx is a moth in the family Gelechiidae. It is found in North America, where it has been recorded from Florida.

The wingspan is about 15 mm. Adults have been recorded on wing nearly year round.
