= Chionodes pastor =

Scientific classification
- Kingdom: Animalia
- Phylum: Arthropoda
- Clade: Pancrustacea
- Class: Insecta
- Order: Lepidoptera
- Family: Gelechiidae
- Genus: Chionodes
- Species: C. pastor

Binomial name
- Chionodes pastor Hodges, 1999

Species of moth

Chionodes pastor is a moth in the family Gelechiidae. It is found in North America, where it has been recorded from Utah and Arizona.

The larvae are leaf-tiers on Quercus arizonica and Quercus gambelii.
