= Chionodes suasor =

Scientific classification
- Kingdom: Animalia
- Phylum: Arthropoda
- Clade: Pancrustacea
- Class: Insecta
- Order: Lepidoptera
- Family: Gelechiidae
- Genus: Chionodes
- Species: C. suasor

Binomial name
- Chionodes suasor Hodges, 1999

Species of moth

Chionodes suasor is a moth in the family Gelechiidae. It is found in North America, where it has been recorded from Kentucky and Arkansas to Mississippi and Texas.

The wingspan is about 13 mm. Adults have been recorded on wing from April to August.
