= Chionodes aruns =

Scientific classification
- Kingdom: Animalia
- Phylum: Arthropoda
- Clade: Pancrustacea
- Class: Insecta
- Order: Lepidoptera
- Family: Gelechiidae
- Genus: Chionodes
- Species: C. aruns

Binomial name
- Chionodes aruns Hodges, 1999

Species of moth

Chionodes aruns is a moth in the family Gelechiidae. It is found in North America, where it has been recorded from Alabama, Kentucky, Louisiana, Maryland, Mississippi, Ohio, Texas and Mexico.

The larvae feed on Hibiscus species.
