= Chionodes paralogella =

Scientific classification
- Kingdom: Animalia
- Phylum: Arthropoda
- Clade: Pancrustacea
- Class: Insecta
- Order: Lepidoptera
- Family: Gelechiidae
- Genus: Chionodes
- Species: C. paralogella

Binomial name
- Chionodes paralogella (Busck, 1916)

Synonyms
- Gelechia paralogella Busck, 1916

Species of moth

Chionodes paralogella is a moth in the family Gelechiidae. It is found in North America, where it has been recorded from California.

The wingspan is about 17 mm. The forewings are blackish brown, nearly black. A short deep black line runs from the base below the costa, dotted with a single bright ochreous scales. There is an indistinct longitudinal row of black dots from the middle to beyond the end of the cell, each black dot edged exteriorly with a few light ochreous scales. There is a few similarly edged black dots on the fold. The hindwings are light fuscous.
