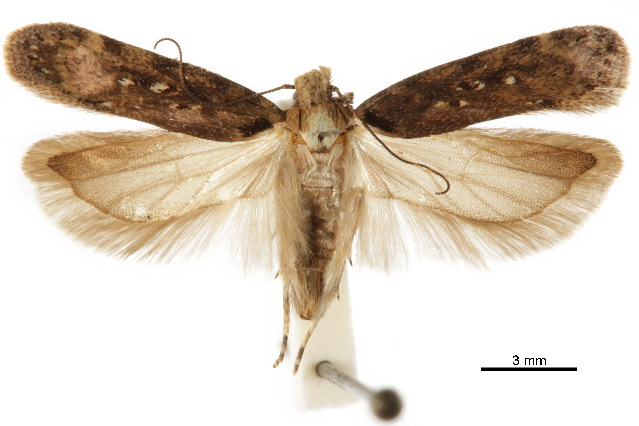

Scientific classification
- Kingdom: Animalia
- Phylum: Arthropoda
- Clade: Pancrustacea
- Class: Insecta
- Order: Lepidoptera
- Family: Gelechiidae
- Genus: Chionodes
- Species: C. acrina

Binomial name
- Chionodes acrina (Keifer, 1933)

Synonyms
- Gelechia acrina Keifer, 1933

= Chionodes acrina =

Species of moth

Chionodes acrina is a moth in the family Gelechiidae. It is found in North America, where it has been recorded from Washington to California.

The larvae feed on Quercus agrifolia.
