= Chionodes lophosella =

Scientific classification
- Kingdom: Animalia
- Phylum: Arthropoda
- Clade: Pancrustacea
- Class: Insecta
- Order: Lepidoptera
- Family: Gelechiidae
- Genus: Chionodes
- Species: C. lophosella

Binomial name
- Chionodes lophosella (Busck, 1910)

Synonyms
- Gelechia lophosella Busck, 1910

Species of moth

Chionodes lophosella is a moth in the family Gelechiidae. It is found in North America, where it has been recorded from Washington to California.

The wingspan is about 12 mm. The forewings are blackish fuscous, with poorly defined ornamentation. There is a small tuft of brown and black scales near the base and a similar tuft of raised scales on the middle of the cell, as well as a somewhat larger tuft obliquely below on the fold, edged with light brown. There are two small, nearly confluent tufts of black scales at the end of the cell, surrounded by light brown. A conspicuous white costal spot is found at the apical fourth and the edge of the wing has a few scattered white scales before the cilia. The hindwings are rather dark fuscous.

The larvae feed on Lupinus chamissonis and Lupinus arboreus.
