= Chionodes lacticoma =

Scientific classification
- Kingdom: Animalia
- Phylum: Arthropoda
- Clade: Pancrustacea
- Class: Insecta
- Order: Lepidoptera
- Family: Gelechiidae
- Genus: Chionodes
- Species: C. lacticoma

Binomial name
- Chionodes lacticoma (Meyrick, 1917)

Synonyms
- Gelechia lacticoma Meyrick, 1917

Species of moth

Chionodes lacticoma is a moth in the family Gelechiidae. It is found in Peru.

The wingspan is 10–11 mm. The forewings are ochreous-whitish or yellow-whitish with fuscous markings, towards the costa irrorated with blackish. There is an oblique wedge-shaped spot from the base of the costa to the fold and a V-shaped marking from the costa before the middle, its apex reaching the fold, marked with black plical and first discal stigmata, the latter obliquely posterior. An irregular fascia is found from three-fourths of the costa to the dorsum before the tornus, the second discal stigma forming a black mark on its anterior margin. There is some more or less indicated blackish irroration towards the apex. The hindwings are light grey.
