= Chionodes abitus =

Scientific classification
- Kingdom: Animalia
- Phylum: Arthropoda
- Clade: Pancrustacea
- Class: Insecta
- Order: Lepidoptera
- Family: Gelechiidae
- Genus: Chionodes
- Species: C. abitus

Binomial name
- Chionodes abitus Hodges, 1999

Species of moth

Chionodes abitus is a moth in the family Gelechiidae. It is found in North America, where it has been recorded from California, Idaho, Montana, Nevada, Oregon, Washington, south-western Saskatchewan and southern British Columbia.

The larvae feed on Salix species, including Salix discolor.
