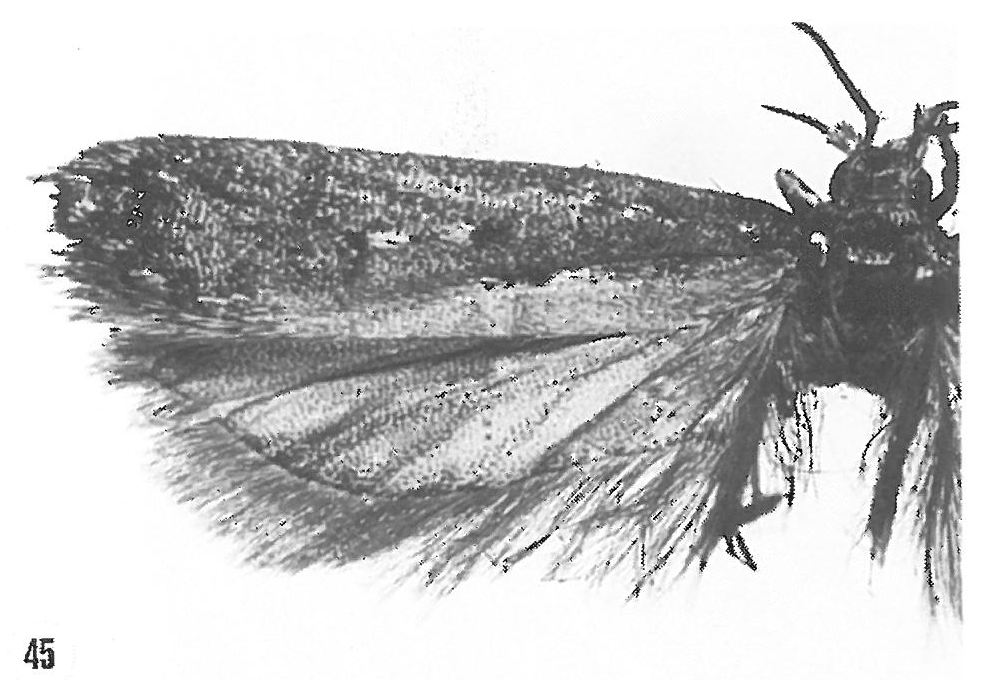
- C. tantella, ♂ paratype, Mongolia (Természettudományi Múzeum, Budapest, Hungary)
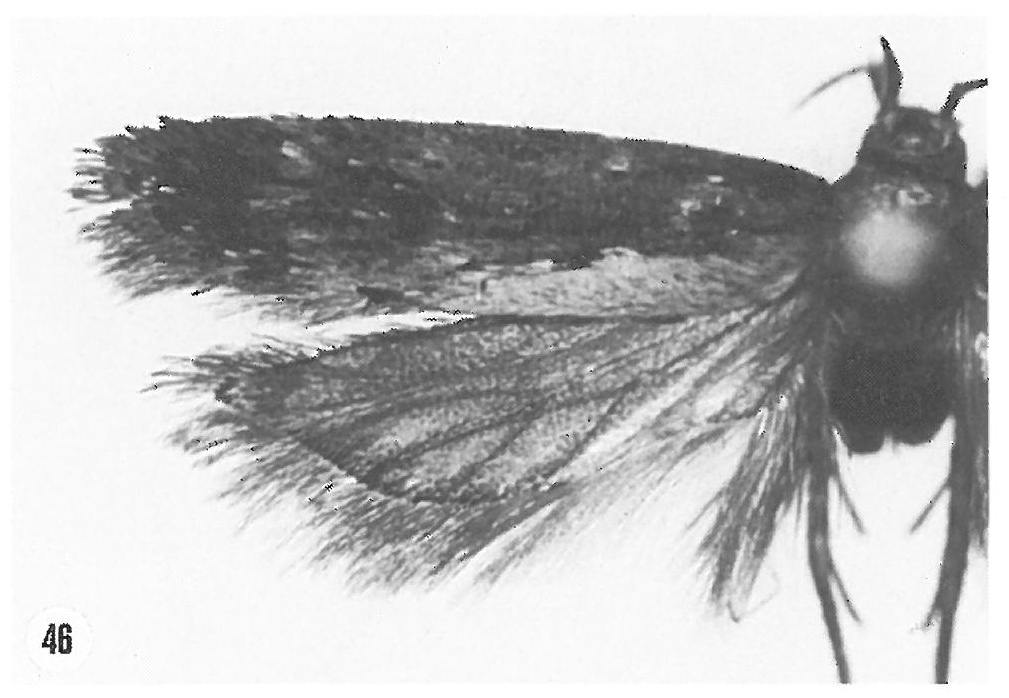
- C. tantella, ♀ paratype, Mongolia (Természettudományi Múzeum, Budapest, Hungary)

Scientific classification
- Kingdom: Animalia
- Phylum: Arthropoda
- Clade: Pancrustacea
- Class: Insecta
- Order: Lepidoptera
- Family: Gelechiidae
- Genus: Chionodes
- Species: C. tantella

Binomial name
- Chionodes tantella Huemer & Sattler, 1995

= Chionodes tantella =

Species of moth

Chionodes tantella is a moth in the family Gelechiidae. It is found in Mongolia and Russia (Transbaikalia).
