= Chionodes trophella =

Scientific classification
- Kingdom: Animalia
- Phylum: Arthropoda
- Clade: Pancrustacea
- Class: Insecta
- Order: Lepidoptera
- Family: Gelechiidae
- Genus: Chionodes
- Species: C. trophella

Binomial name
- Chionodes trophella (Busck, 1903)

Synonyms
- Gelechia trophella Busck, 1903

Species of moth

Chionodes trophella is a moth in the family Gelechiidae. It is found in North America, where it has been recorded from Colorado, Utah, Texas, New Mexico and Arizona.

The wingspan is 15–16 mm. The basal half of the forewings is dark iridescent fuscous, intermixed with white and black scales. There is an oblique outwardly directed black costal streak at the basal third, somewhat wider at its lower end on the cell. The outer half of the forewings is shining black, with sparse white scales around the edges. There is a transverse, perpendicular, slightly outwardly angulated white fascia across the wing at the apical third. The hindwings are light shining fuscous.

The larvae feed on Quercus gambelii.
