= Chionodes pereyra =

Scientific classification
- Kingdom: Animalia
- Phylum: Arthropoda
- Clade: Pancrustacea
- Class: Insecta
- Order: Lepidoptera
- Family: Gelechiidae
- Genus: Chionodes
- Species: C. pereyra

Binomial name
- Chionodes pereyra Clarke, 1947

Species of moth

Chionodes pereyra is a moth in the family Gelechiidae. It is found in North America, where it has been recorded from Massachusetts and Michigan to Florida and Texas.

The larvae feed on Quercus species of the red oak group.
