= Chionodes frigidella =

Scientific classification
- Kingdom: Animalia
- Phylum: Arthropoda
- Clade: Pancrustacea
- Class: Insecta
- Order: Lepidoptera
- Family: Gelechiidae
- Genus: Chionodes
- Species: C. frigidella

Binomial name
- Chionodes frigidella Huemer & Sattler, 1995

Species of moth

Chionodes frigidella is a moth in the family Gelechiidae. It is found in the Palearctic realm.
