= Chionodes franclemonti =

Scientific classification
- Kingdom: Animalia
- Phylum: Arthropoda
- Clade: Pancrustacea
- Class: Insecta
- Order: Lepidoptera
- Family: Gelechiidae
- Genus: Chionodes
- Species: C. franclemonti

Binomial name
- Chionodes franclemonti Hodges, 1999

Species of moth

Chionodes franclemonti is a moth in the family Gelechiidae. It is found in North America, where it has been recorded from New Jersey and Maine to Florida and Wisconsin.

The larvae feed on Helianthemum nashii and Hudsonia tomentosa.
