= Chionodes theurgis =

Scientific classification
- Kingdom: Animalia
- Phylum: Arthropoda
- Clade: Pancrustacea
- Class: Insecta
- Order: Lepidoptera
- Family: Gelechiidae
- Genus: Chionodes
- Species: C. theurgis

Binomial name
- Chionodes theurgis Hodges, 1999

Species of moth

Chionodes theurgis is a moth in the family Gelechiidae. It is found in North America, where it has been recorded from southern Quebec, New Hampshire, southern Michigan, northern Nebraska, southern Manitoba, south-eastern Wyoming, Colorado and Arizona.
