= Chionodes attonita =

Scientific classification
- Kingdom: Animalia
- Phylum: Arthropoda
- Clade: Pancrustacea
- Class: Insecta
- Order: Lepidoptera
- Family: Gelechiidae
- Genus: Chionodes
- Species: C. attonita

Binomial name
- Chionodes attonita (Meyrick, 1912)

Synonyms
- Oxycryptis attonita Meyrick, 1912

Species of moth

Chionodes attonita is a moth in the family Gelechiidae. It is found in Colombia.

The wingspan is about 17 mm. The forewings are brownish-ochreous with a very obscure oblique brown fascia from one-third of the costa, not crossing the fold. The apical half of the wing, beyond an oblique line parallel to this, is suffused with brown and there are some rough erect scales along the fold from near the base to the fascia. The hindwings are grey with a subcostal pencil of long ochreous-tinged hairs extending and a slight pencil of long hairs lying along the lower margin of the cell from the base.
