= Chionodes sattleri =

Scientific classification
- Kingdom: Animalia
- Phylum: Arthropoda
- Clade: Pancrustacea
- Class: Insecta
- Order: Lepidoptera
- Family: Gelechiidae
- Genus: Chionodes
- Species: C. sattleri

Binomial name
- Chionodes sattleri Hodges, 1999

Species of moth

Chionodes sattleri is a moth in the family Gelechiidae. It is found in North America, where it has been recorded from Newfoundland, from Nova Scotia to British Columbia to Yukon and Alaska, as well as in Indiana, Maine, Michigan, Minnesota, Montana, New Hampshire, Wyoming and Colorado.
