= Chionodes argentipunctella =

Scientific classification
- Kingdom: Animalia
- Phylum: Arthropoda
- Clade: Pancrustacea
- Class: Insecta
- Order: Lepidoptera
- Family: Gelechiidae
- Genus: Chionodes
- Species: C. argentipunctella

Binomial name
- Chionodes argentipunctella (Ely, 1910)

Synonyms
- Gelechia argentipunctella Ely, 1910

Species of moth

Chionodes argentipunctella is a moth in the family Gelechiidae. It is found in North America, where it has been recorded from Vermont, south-eastern Ontario, New Jersey, Illinois and Connecticut.

The wingspan is about 17 mm. The forewings are very dark purplish with a white spot on the costa at the apical third, shaded with black anteriorly. There are two black discal spots shaded with white near the middle of the wing and a similar one on the fold, below the first and nearer the base. The hindwings are yellowish.

The larvae feed on Alnus species and Corylus americana.
