= Chionodes hodgesorum =

Scientific classification
- Kingdom: Animalia
- Phylum: Arthropoda
- Clade: Pancrustacea
- Class: Insecta
- Order: Lepidoptera
- Family: Gelechiidae
- Genus: Chionodes
- Species: C. hodgesorum

Binomial name
- Chionodes hodgesorum Metzler, 2014

Species of moth

Chionodes hodgesorum is a moth in the family Gelechiidae. It is found in North America, where it has been recorded from the gypsum dunes at White Sands National Park in New Mexico.

== Etymology ==
The species is named in honor of Ronald W. Hodges and his wife Elaine.
