= Chionodes flavicorporella =

Scientific classification
- Kingdom: Animalia
- Phylum: Arthropoda
- Clade: Pancrustacea
- Class: Insecta
- Order: Lepidoptera
- Family: Gelechiidae
- Genus: Chionodes
- Species: C. flavicorporella

Binomial name
- Chionodes flavicorporella (Walsingham, 1882)

Synonyms
- Gelechia flavicorporella Walsingham, 1882

Species of moth

Chionodes flavicorporella is a moth in the family Gelechiidae. It is found in North America, where it has been recorded from Alberta, Prince Edward Island, Manitoba, Ontario, Maine, Michigan, New York, West Virginia, Colorado, Montana, Wyoming and Yukon.

The wingspan is about 20 mm. The forewings are about equally covered by greyish-fuscous, whitish ochreous, and brownish ochreous scales, the brownish prevailing across the middle, the fuscous beyond the middle, and the whitish around the apical margin and fringes. There are four indistinct spots of whitish scales, two on the outer half, one on the inner half of the cell and one on the fold. The hindwings are greyish.
