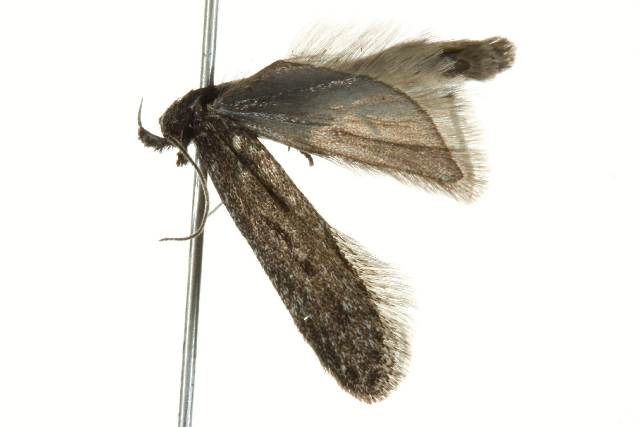

Scientific classification
- Kingdom: Animalia
- Phylum: Arthropoda
- Clade: Pancrustacea
- Class: Insecta
- Order: Lepidoptera
- Family: Gelechiidae
- Genus: Chionodes
- Species: C. agriodes

Binomial name
- Chionodes agriodes (Meyrick, 1927)

Synonyms
- Gelechia agriodes Meyrick, 1927; Gelechia seculaella Clarke, 1932

= Chionodes agriodes =

Species of moth

Chionodes agriodes is a moth in the family Gelechiidae. It is found in North America, where it has been recorded from southern Alberta and southern British Columbia to Utah, Colorado and California.

The wingspan is about 20 mm. The forewings are light grey irrorated dark grey and with the stigmata blackish-grey, the plical and first discal elongate, the plical somewhat anterior, the second discal roundish but with a fine projecting dash anteriorly. There is a marginal series of small cloudy blackish-grey spots around the posterior part of the costa and termen partly in the cilia. The hindwings are light bluish-grey.
