= Chionodes ermolaevi =

Scientific classification
- Kingdom: Animalia
- Phylum: Arthropoda
- Clade: Pancrustacea
- Class: Insecta
- Order: Lepidoptera
- Family: Gelechiidae
- Genus: Chionodes
- Species: C. ermolaevi

Binomial name
- Chionodes ermolaevi Bidzilya, 2012

Species of moth

Chionodes ermolaevi is a moth in the family Gelechiidae. It is found in the Russian Far East, where it has been recorded from Sakhalin Island.
