= Chionodes xylobathra =

Scientific classification
- Kingdom: Animalia
- Phylum: Arthropoda
- Clade: Pancrustacea
- Class: Insecta
- Order: Lepidoptera
- Family: Gelechiidae
- Genus: Chionodes
- Species: C. xylobathra

Binomial name
- Chionodes xylobathra (Meyrick, 1936)

Synonyms
- Gelechia xylobathra Meyrick, 1936

Species of moth

Chionodes xylobathra is a moth in the family Gelechiidae. It is found in Venezuela.
