= Chionodes argosema =

Scientific classification
- Kingdom: Animalia
- Phylum: Arthropoda
- Clade: Pancrustacea
- Class: Insecta
- Order: Lepidoptera
- Family: Gelechiidae
- Genus: Chionodes
- Species: C. argosema

Binomial name
- Chionodes argosema (Meyrick, 1917)

Synonyms
- Gelechia argosema Meyrick, 1917

Species of moth

Chionodes argosema is a moth in the family Gelechiidae. It is found in Ecuador.

The wingspan is 9–11 mm. The forewings are dark purplish-fuscous with a sub-triangular transverse ochreous-white spot from the dorsum before the tornus, reaching half across the wing, and a smaller spot from the costa at three-fourths. The hindwings are grey.
