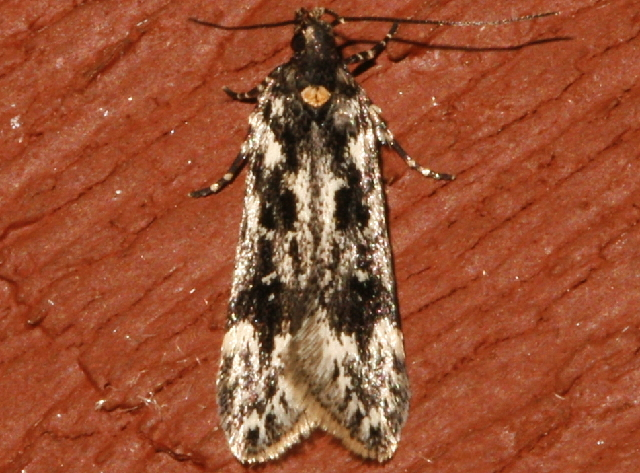

Scientific classification
- Domain: Eukaryota
- Kingdom: Animalia
- Phylum: Arthropoda
- Class: Insecta
- Order: Lepidoptera
- Family: Gelechiidae
- Genus: Chionodes
- Species: C. tessa

Binomial name
- Chionodes tessa Clarke, 1947

= Chionodes tessa =

Species of moth

Chionodes tessa is a moth in the family Gelechiidae. It is found in North America, where it has been recorded from Washington to Idaho, Oregon, California and Arizona.
