= Chionodes gilvomaculella =

Scientific classification
- Kingdom: Animalia
- Phylum: Arthropoda
- Clade: Pancrustacea
- Class: Insecta
- Order: Lepidoptera
- Family: Gelechiidae
- Genus: Chionodes
- Species: C. gilvomaculella

Binomial name
- Chionodes gilvomaculella (Clemens, 1863)

Synonyms
- Gelechia gilvomaculella Clemens, 1863

Species of moth

Chionodes gilvomaculella is a moth in the family Gelechiidae. It is found in North America, where it has been recorded from Nova Scotia and southern Ontario to West Virginia and Ohio.

The forewings are dark brownish, with an indistinct yellowish spot on the costa near the base of the wing and one of the same colour on the middle of the costa, extended indistinctly or diffusely to the fold, where there is a blackish-brown spot. A yellowish streak is found on the costa near the tip, with an opposite one of the same colour on the inner margin. The hindwings are dark greyish.

The larvae feed on Quercus species.
