= List of moths of North America (MONA 855–2311) =

North American moths represent about 12,000 types of moths. In comparison, there are about 825 species of North American butterflies. The moths (mostly nocturnal) and butterflies (mostly diurnal) together make up the taxonomic order Lepidoptera.

This list is sorted by MONA number (MONA is short for Moths of America North of Mexico). A numbering system for North American moths introduced by Ronald W. Hodges et al. in 1983 in the publication Check List of the Lepidoptera of America North of Mexico. The list has since been updated but the placement in families is outdated for some species.

This list covers America north of Mexico (effectively the continental United States and Canada). For a list of moths and butterflies recorded from the state of Hawaii, see List of Lepidoptera of Hawaii.

This is a partial list, covering moths with MONA numbers ranging from 855 to 2311. For the rest of the list, see List of moths of North America.

== Oecophoridae ==
- 0855 – Agonopterix gelidella
- 0856 – Agonopterix hyperella
- 0857 – Agonopterix lythrella
- 0858 – Agonopterix nubiferella
- 0859 – Agonopterix curvilineella, curved-line agonopterix moth
- 0860 – Agonopterix muricolorella
- 0861 – Agonopterix oregonensis
- 0862 – Agonopterix clemensella
- 0863 – Agonopterix clarkei
- 0864 – Agonopterix atrodorsella
- 0865 – Agonopterix pteleae
- 0866 – Agonopterix eupatoriiella
- 0867 – Agonopterix pulvipennella
- 0868 – Agonopterix nigrinotella
- 0868.1 – Agonopterix costimacula
- 0868.2 – Agonopterix paulae
- 0869 – Agonopterix walsinghamella, Walsingham's agonopterix moth
- 0870 – Agonopterix fusciterminella
- 0871 – Agonopterix chrautis
- 0872 – Agonopterix sabulella
- 0873 – Agonopterix dammersi
- 0874 – Agonopterix cajonensis
- 0874.1 – Agonopterix alstroemeriana, poison hemlock moth
- 0875 – Agonopterix toega
- 0876 – Agonopterix rosaciliella
- 0877 – Agonopterix ciliella
- 0878 – Agonopterix canadensis, Canadian agonopterix moth
- 0879 – Agonopterix arnicella
- 0880 – Agonopterix flavicomella
- 0881 – Agonopterix senicionella
- 0882 – Agonopterix robiniella, four-dotted agonopterix moth
- 0883 – Agonopterix cratia
- 0884 – Agonopterix thelmae, Thelma's agonopterix moth
- 0885 – Agonopterix sanguinella
- 0886 – Agonopterix lecontella
- 0887 – Agonopterix dimorphella
- 0888 – Agonopterix pergandeella
- 0889 – Agonopterix argillacea
- 0890 – Agonopterix amissella
- 0891 – Agonopterix psoraliella
- 0892 – Agonopterix hesphoea
- 0893 – Agonopterix antennariella
- 0894 – Agonopterix nebulosa
- 0895 – Agonopterix nervosa, gorse tip moth
- 0896 – Agonopterix posticella
- 0897 – Agonopterix latipalpella
- 0898 – Agonopterix amyrisella
- 0899 – Depressariodes canella
- 0900 – Depressariodes umbraticostella
- 0901 – Depressariodes sordidella
- 0902 – Depressariodes gracilis
- 0903 – Depressariodes thoracenigraeella
- 0904 – Depressariodes thoracefasciella
- 0905 – Depressariodes nechlys
- 0906 – Depressariodes nivalis
- 0907 – Depressariodes hildaella
- 0908 – Depressariodes ciniflonella
- 0909 – Depressariodes scabella
- 0910 – Depressariodes fulva
- 0911 – Bibarrambla allenella, bog bibarrambla moth
- 0912 – Semioscopis packardella, Packard's concealer moth
- 0913 – Semioscopis merriccella
- 0914 – Semioscopis inornata
- 0915 – Semioscopis megamicrella
- 0916 – Semioscopis aurorella
- 0917 – Semioscopis mcdunnoughi
- 0918 – Depressaria atrostrigella
- 0919 – Depressaria artemisiae
- 0920 – Depressaria palousella
- 0921 – Depressaria cinereocostella
- 0922 – Depressaria pastinacella, parsnip webworm moth
- 0923 – Depressaria juliella
- 0924 – Depressaria daucella
- 0924.1 – Depressaria depressana, purple carrot-seed moth
- 0925 – Depressaria eleanorae
- 0926 – Depressaria alienella
- 0927 – Depressaria artemisiella
- 0928 – Depressaria constancei
- 0929 – Depressaria betina
- 0930 – Depressaria whitmani
- 0931 – Depressaria schellbachi
- 0932 – Depressaria angelicivora
- 0933 – Depressaria leptotaeniae
- 0934 – Depressaria yakimae
- 0935 – Depressaria multifidae
- 0936 – Depressaria moya
- 0937 – Depressaria besma
- 0938 – Depressaria pteryxiphaga
- 0939 – Depressaria togata
- 0940 – Depressaria armata
- 0941 – Depressaria angustati
- 0942 – Nites grotella, hazel leaftier moth
- 0943 – Nites atrocapitella
- 0944 – Nites betulella, black-dotted birch leaftier moth
- 0945 – Nites maculatella
- 0946 – Nites ostryella
- 0947 – Apachea barberella
- 0948 – Himmacia huachucella
- 0949 – Himmacia stratia
- 0950 – Himmacia diligenda
- 0951 – Machimia tentoriferella, gold-striped leaftier moth
- 0952 – Machimia trigama
- 0953 – Eupragia hospita
- 0954 – Eupragia banis
- 0955 – Psilocorsis quercicella, oak leaftier moth
- 0956 – Psilocorsis cryptolechiella, black-fringed leaftier moth
- 0957 – Psilocorsis reflexella, dotted leaftier moth
- 0958 – Psilocorsis amydra
- 0959 – Psilocorsis arguta
- 0959.1 – Psilocorsis fatula
- 0960 – Psilocorsis cirrhoptera
- 0961 – Pyramidobela quinquecristata
- 0961.1 – Pyramidobela angelarum, buddleia budworm moth
- 0961.2 – Pyramidobela agyrtodes
- 0962 – Ethmia umbrimarginella
- 0963 – Ethmia lassenella
- 0964 – Ethmia coquillettella
- 0965 – Ethmia monachella
- 0966 – Ethmia scylla
- 0967 – Ethmia brevistriga
- 0968 – Ethmia albitogata
- 0969 – Ethmia plagiobothrae
- 0970 – Ethmia minuta
- 0971 – Ethmia tricula
- 0972 – Ethmia charybdis
- 0973 – Ethmia albistrigella
- 0974 – Ethmia nadia
- 0975 – Ethmia orestella
- 0976 – Ethmia semilugens
- 0977 – Ethmia epileuca
- 0978 – Ethmia apicipunctella
- 0979 – Ethmia arctostaphylella
- 0980 W – Ethmia discostrigella, mountain-mahogany moth
- 0981 – Ethmia semitenebrella
- 0982 – Ethmia macelhosiella
- 0983 – Ethmia geranella
- 0984 – Ethmia timberlakei
- 0985 – Ethmia macneilli
- 0986 – Ethmia bipunctella, viper's bugloss moth
- 0987 – Ethmia monticola, gray ethmia moth
- 0988 – Ethmia caliginosella
- 0989 – Ethmia hagenella
- 0990 – Ethmia mimihagenella
- 0991 – Ethmia burnsella
- 0992 – Ethmia zelleriella, Zeller's ethmia moth
- 0993 – Ethmia delliella, ladder-backed ethmia moth
- 0994 – Ethmia bittenella
- 0994.1 – Ethmia abraxasella
- 0994.2 – Ethmia submissa
- 0994.3 – Ethmia subsimilis
- 0995 – Ethmia notatella
- 0996 – Ethmia confusella
- 0997 – Ethmia julia
- 0998 – Ethmia farrella
- 0998.1 – Ethmia powelli
- 0999 – Ethmia longimaculella, streaked ethmia moth
- 0999.1 – Ethmia kutisi
- 1000 – Ethmia semiombra
- 1001 – Ethmia albicostella
- 1002 – Ethmia mirusella
- 1003 – Ethmia trifurcella
- 1004 – Ethmia marmorea
- 1005 – Ethmia hodgesella
- 1006 – Ethmia sphenisca
- 1007 – Ethmia prattiella
- 1007.1 – Ethmia angustalatella
- 1008 – Pseudethmia protuberans
- 1009 – Pseuderotis obiterella
- 1010 – Durrantia piperatella
- 1010.1 – Autosticha kyotensis, Kyoto moth
- 1011 – Antaeotricha schlaegeri, Schlaeger's fruitworm moth
- 1012 – Antaeotricha lindseyi
- 1013 – Antaeotricha unipunctella
- 1014 – Antaeotricha leucillana, pale gray bird-dropping moth
- 1015 – Antaeotricha osseella
- 1016 – Antaeotricha decorosella
- 1017 – Antaeotricha furcata
- 1018 – Antaeotricha irene
- 1019 – Antaeotricha humilis, dotted anteotricha moth
- 1020 – Antaeotricha agriochista
- 1021 – Antaeotricha thomasi
- 1022 – Antaeotricha haesitans
- 1023 – Antaeotricha fuscorectangulata
- 1024 – Antaeotricha vestalis, Vestal moth
- 1025 – Antaeotricha manzanitae
- 1025.1 – Antaeotricha arizonensis, Ferris's antaeotricha moth
- 1026 – Rectiostoma xanthobasis, yellow-vested moth
- 1027 – Rectiostoma fernaldella
- 1028 – Menestomorpha oblongata
- 1029 – Menestomorpha kimballi
- 1030 – Menesta tortriciformella
- 1031 – Menesta melanella
- 1031.1 – Chlamydastis habrolepis
- 1032 – Gonioterma mistrella
- 1033 – Gonioterma crambitella
- 1034 – Inga sparsiciliella, black-marked inga moth
- 1035 – Inga cretacea, chalky inga moth
- 1036 – Inga ciliella
- 1037 – Inga obscuromaculella
- 1038 – Inga canariella
- 1039 – Inga concolorella
- 1040 – Inga proditrix
- 1041 – Inga rimatrix
- 1042 – Decantha boreasella, reticulated decantha moth
- 1043 – Decantha stecia
- 1044 – Decantha tistra
- 1045 – Decantha stonda
- 1046 – Epicallima argenticinctella, orange-headed epicallima moth
- 1047 – Epicallima nathrax
- 1047.1 – Promalactis suzukiella, Suzuki's promalactis moth
- 1048 – Dafa formosella, beautiful epicallima moth
- 1049 – Batia lunaris, batia moth
- 1050 – Fabiola shaleriella, Shaler's fabiola moth
- 1051 – Fabiola tecta
- 1052 – Fabiola lucidella
- 1053 – Fabiola edithella, Edith's fabiola moth
- 1054 – Fabiola quinqueferella
- 1055 – Brymblia quadrimaculella
- 1056 – Denisia haydenella
- 1057 – Esperia sulphurella, sulphur esperia moth
- 1058 – Polix coloradella, the skunk moth
- 1059 – Mathildana newmanella, Newman's mathildana moth
- 1060 – Mathildana flipria
- 1061 – Borkhausenia nefrax
- 1062 – Carolana ascriptella
- 1063 – Carolana golmeia
- 1064 – Hofmannophila pseudospretella, brown house moth
- 1065 – Martyringa latipennis
- 1066 – Martyringa xeraula, Himalayan grain moth
- 1067 – Endrosis sarcitrella, white-shouldered house moth
- 1068 – Eido trimaculella
- 1069 – Carcina quercana, oak skeletonizer moth
- 1069.1 – Oecophora bractella
- 1070 – Stathmopoda elyella
- 1070.1 – Stathmopoda aenea
- 1071 – Stathmopoda pedella
- 1072 – Idioglossa miraculosa
- 1073 – Cyphacma tragiae
- 1074 – Pleurota albastrigulella
- 1075 – Cheimophila salicella, blueberry flagleaf webworm moth

== Elachistidae ==
- 1076 – Coelopoeta glutinosi
- 1076.1 – Coelopoeta phaceliae
- 1076.2 – Coelopoeta maiadella
- 1077 – Perittia cygnodiella
- 1077.1 – Perittia herrichiella
- 1077.2 – Perittia passula
- 1077.3 – Mendesia serica
- 1077.4 – Mendesia metaxea
- 1077.5 – Perittia clarkei
- 1078 – Annettenia eremonoma
- 1079 – Stephensia cunilae
- 1080 – Elachista dasycara
- 1081 – Elachista epimicta
- 1081.1 – Elachista perniva
- 1082 – Elachista symmorpha
- 1083 – Elachista orestella
- 1084 – Elachista synopla
- 1084.1 – Elachista ischnella
- 1084.2 – Elachista nubila
- 1084.3 – Elachista anagna
- 1084.4 – Elachista triangulifera
- 1085 – Elachista spatiosa
- 1086 – Elachista aurocristata
- 1087 – Elachista controversa
- 1088 – Elachista virgatula
- 1088.1 – Elachista inopina
- 1088.2 – Elachista conidia
- 1088.3 – Elachista lurida
- 1088.4 – Elachista thelma
- 1088.5 – Elachista louisella
- 1088.6 – Elachista dagnirella
- 1088.7 – Elachista aerinella
- 1089 – Elachista adempta
- 1089.1 – Elachista scobifera
- 1089.2 – Elachista apina
- 1089.3 – Elachista achrantella
- 1090 – Elachista griseicornis
- 1090.1 – Elachista adianta
- 1090.2 – Elachista nucula
- 1091 – Elachista acenteta
- 1091.1 – Elachista aphyodes
- 1092 – Elachista hololeuca
- 1094 – Elachista lamina
- 1094.1 – Elachista sabulella
- 1094.2 – Elachista granosa
- 1095 – Elachista sincera
- 1096 – Elachista parvipulvella
- 1097 – Elachista coniophora
- 1097.1 – Elachista argillacea
- 1098 – Elachista hiberna
- 1098.1 – Elachista subalbidella
- 1099 – Elachista patriodoxa
- 1099.1 – Elachista lomionella
- 1099.2 – Elachista dissona
- 1099.3 – Elachista arena
- 1099.4 – Elachista ossuaria
- 1099.5 – Elachista aspila
- 1099.6 – Elachista loriella
- 1100 – Elachista irrorata
- 1100.1 – Elachista olorinella
- 1101 – Elachista fuliginea
- 1101.1 – Elachista kilmunella
- 1102 – Elachista alpinella
- 1103 – Elachista pusilla
- 1105 – Elachista maculoscella
- 1106 – Elachista excelsicola
- 1106.1 – Elachista zernyi
- 1107 – Elachista stramineola
- 1107.1 – Elachista morwenella
- 1107.2 – Elachista marachella
- 1107.3 – Elachista telcharella
- 1107.4 – Elachista finarfinella
- 1107.5 – Elachista indisella
- 1107.6 – Elachista gildorella
- 1107.7 – Elachista tauronella
- 1108 – Elachista leucofrons
- 1109 – Elachista albicapitella
- 1109.1 – Elachista haldarella
- 1110 – Elachista sylvestris
- 1112 – Elachista texanica
- 1113 – Elachista maritimella
- 1113.1 – Elachista curufinella
- 1113.2 – Elachista ragnorella
- 1113.3 – Elachista gorlimella
- 1114 – Elachista staintonella
- 1114.1 – Elachista maglorella
- 1114.2 – Elachista bregorella
- 1114.3 – Elachista caranthirella
- 1114.4 – Elachista turgonella
- 1115 – Elachista cana
- 1115.1 – Elachista arthadella
- 1115.2 – Elachista telerella
- 1115.3 – Elachista dolabella
- 1115.4 – Elachista cicadella
- 1116 – Elachista amideta
- 1116.1 – Elachista celegormella
- 1116.2 – Elachista daeronella
- 1116.3 – Elachista aredhella
- 1116.4 – Elachista amrodella
- 1116.5 – Elachista diorella
- 1117 – Elachista inaudita
- 1118 – Elachista praelineata
- 1118.1 – Elachista ibunella
- 1118.2 – Elachista aristoteliella
- 1118.3 – Elachista eilinella
- 1118.4 – Elachista guilinella
- 1118.5 – Elachista turinella
- 1118.6 – Elachista nienorella
- 1118.7 – Elachista aranella
- 1118.8 – Elachista miriella
- 1118.9 – Elachista serindella
- 1119 – Elachista solitaria
- 1120 – Elachista radiantella
- 1121 – Elachista madarella
- 1122 – Elachista enitescens
- 1123 – Elachista argentosa
- 1123.1 – Elachista glenni
- 1123.2 – Elachista diederichsiella
- 1124 – Elachista cucullata
- 1124.1 – Elachista calusella
- 1125 – Elachista agilis
- 1126 – Elachista leucosticta
- 1126.1 – Elachista absaroka
- 1127 – Elachista albidella
- 1128 – Elachista salinaris
- 1128.1 – Elachista eleochariella
- 1128.2 – Elachista beothucella
- 1128.3 – Elachista cerasella
- 1128.4 – Elachista huron
- 1128.5 – Elachista serra
- 1128.6 – Elachista vinlandica
- 1128.7 – Elachista ciliigera
- 1128.8 – Elachista lenape
- 1128.9 – Elachista pelaena
- 1129 – Elachista illectella
- 1129.1 – Elachista beorella
- 1130 – Elachista herbigrada
- 1130.1 – Elachista neithanella
- 1130.2 – Elachista tuorella
- 1130.3 – Elachista galadella
- 1130.4 – Elachista rianella
- 1130.5 – Elachista pyrrha
- 1131 – Elachista scopulicola
- 1132 – Elachista brachyelythrifoliella
- 1132.1 – Elachista saccharella, sugarcane leafminer moth
- 1132.2 – Elachista dulcinella
- 1132.3 – Elachista suavella
- 1132.4 – Elachista helodella
- 1132.5 – Elachista angularis
- 1132.6 – Elachista uniolae
- 1132.7 – Elachista hedionella
- 1132.8 – Elachista freyerella

== Symmocidae ==
- 1133 – Symmoca signatella
- 1134 – Oegoconia quadripuncta, four-spotted yellowneck moth
- 1134.1 – Spinitibia hodgesi
- 1135 – Sceptea aequepulvella

== Glyphidoceridae ==
- 1136 – Glyphidocera barythyma
- 1136.1 – Glyphidocera juniperella, juniper tip moth
- 1137 – Glyphidocera democratica
- 1138 – Glyphidocera floridanella
- 1138.1 – Glyphidocera hurlberti
- 1139 – Glyphidocera lactiflosella, five-spotted glyphidocera moth
- 1140 – Glyphidocera lithodoxa
- 1141 – Glyphidocera meyrickella
- 1142 – Glyphidocera septentrionella
- 1142.1 – Glyphidocera wrightorum
- 1143 – Glyphidocera dimorphella

== Autostichidae ==
- 1144 – Gerdana caritella

== Blastobasidae ==
- 1148 – Holcocera guilandinae
- 1149 – Hypatopa hulstella
- 1150.1 – Blastobasis ochrobathra
- 1151 – Asaphocrita plummerella
- 1151.1 – Hypatopa simplicella
- 1152 – Hypatopa sagitella
- 1153 – Blastobasis segnella
- 1154 – Blastobasis yuccaecolella
- 1156 – Hypatopa titanella
- 1158 – Holcocera coccivorella, scale-feeding scavenger moth
- 1159 – Blastobasis confectella
- 1160 – Blastobasis floridella
- 1162 – Blastobasis glandulella, acorn moth
- 1163 – Blastobasis nothrotes
- 1164 – Blastobasis quaintancella
- 1165 – Blastobasis repartella
- 1166 – Blastobasis retectella
- 1167 – Blastobasis pulchella
- 1168 – Calosima argyrosplendella
- 1169 – Calosima dianella, eastern pine catkin borer moth
- 1169.1 – Calosima lucidella
- 1169.2 – Calosima lepidophaga
- 1170 – Asaphocrita protypica
- 1171 – Asaphocrita aphidiella
- 1173 – Hypatopa boreasella
- 1173.1 – Hypatopa annulipes
- 1174 – Asaphocrita busckiella
- 1175 – Holcocera chalcofrontella
- 1177 – Blastobasis confamulella
- 1178 – Holcocera crassicornella
- 1179 – Hypatopa crescentella
- 1181 – Calosima elyella
- 1181.1 – Calosima munroei
- 1182 – Asaphocrita estriatella
- 1182.1 – Asaphocrita fuscopurpurella
- 1183 – Hypatopa fluxella
- 1184 – Hypatopa funebra
- 1185 – Holcocera gigantella
- 1187 – Holcocera iceryaeella
- 1188 – Hypatopa illibella
- 1190 – Hypatopa inconspicua
- 1191 – Hypatopa insulatella
- 1192 – Hypatopa interpunctella
- 1193 – Asaphocrita irenica
- 1197 – Calosima melanostriatella
- 1198 – Hypatopa messelinella
- 1200 – Hypatopa morrisoni
- 1202 – Hypatopa nigrostriata
- 1203 – Hypatopa nucella
- 1205 – Holcocera panurgella
- 1206 – Holcocera paradoxa
- 1206.1 – Holcocera villella
- 1207 – Asaphocrita plagiatella
- 1208 – Hypatopa punctiferella
- 1212 – Asaphocrita sciaphilella
- 1213 – Hypatopa texanella
- 1214 – Hypatopa spretella
- 1217 – Hypatopa ursella
- 1218 – Hypatopa vestaliella
- 1221 – Holcocera immaculella
- 1224 – Holcocera anomalella
- 1225 – Holcocera gargantuella
- 1225.1 – Holcocera concolor
- 1227 – Pigritia fidella
- 1229 – Pigritia arizonella
- 1232 – Pigritia laticapitella
- 1237 – Hypatopa spoliatella
- 1239 – Pigritia ochrocomella
- 1239.1 – Mastema occidentalis
- 1239.2 – Pterolonche inspersa
- 1246 – Pigritia murtfeldtella

== Coleophoridae and Batrachedridae ==
- 1254 – Coleophora malivorella, pistol casebearer moth
- 1255 – Coleophora sacramenta
- 1256 – Coleophora tiliaefoliella
- 1257 – Coleophora atromarginata, American pistol casebearer moth
- 1258 – Coleophora albovanescens
- 1259 – Coleophora discostriata
- 1260 – Coleophora elaeagnisella, speckled casebearer moth
- 1261 – Coleophora querciella
- 1262 – Coleophora rosaefoliella
- 1263 – Coleophora laurentella
- 1264 – Coleophora vancouverensis
- 1265 – Coleophora annulicola
- 1266 – Coleophora asterophagella
- 1267 – Coleophora wyethiae
- 1268 – Coleophora monardella
- 1269 – Coleophora vernoniaeella
- 1270 – Coleophora argentella
- 1271 – Coleophora pruniella, cherry casebearer moth
- 1272 – Coleophora leucochrysella
- 1273 – Coleophora kalmiella
- 1274 – Coleophora canadensisella
- 1275 – Coleophora salicivorella
- 1276 – Coleophora gaylussaciella
- 1277 – Coleophora cornivorella
- 1278 – Coleophora viburniella
- 1279 – Coleophora affiliatella
- 1280 – Coleophora multicristatella
- 1281 – Coleophora dissociella
- 1282 – Coleophora vacciniivorella
- 1283 – Coleophora cretaticostella
- 1284 – Coleophora murinella
- 1285 – Coleophora rupestrella
- 1286 – Coleophora ledi
- 1287 – Coleophora persimplexella
- 1288 – Coleophora manitoba
- 1289 – Coleophora accordella
- 1289.1 – Coleophora colutella
- 1290 – Coleophora kearfottella
- 1291 – Coleophora laticornella, pecan cigar casebearer moth
- 1292 – Coleophora corylifoliella
- 1293 – Coleophora juglandella
- 1294 – Coleophora lentella
- 1295 – Coleophora ostryae
- 1296 – Coleophora alniella
- 1297 – Coleophora cornella
- 1298 – Coleophora alnifoliae
- 1299 – Coleophora umbratica
- 1300 – Coleophora comptoniella, birch casebearer moth
- 1301 – Coleophora ulmifoliella, elm casebearer moth
- 1301.1 – Coleophora limosipennella
- 1301.2 – Coleophora badiipennella
- 1302 – Coleophora granifera
- 1303 – Coleophora astericola
- 1304 – Coleophora paludoides
- 1305 – Coleophora glaucella
- 1306 – Coleophora polemoniella
- 1307 – Coleophora cerasivorella
- 1308 – Coleophora serratella, cigar casebearer moth
- 1309 – Coleophora irroratella
- 1310 – Coleophora demissella
- 1311 – Coleophora laricella, larch casebearer moth
- 1312 – Coleophora asterosella
- 1313 – Coleophora rosaevorella
- 1314 – Coleophora acutipennella
- 1315 – Coleophora bistrigella
- 1316 – Coleophora rosacella
- 1317 – Coleophora viscidiflorella
- 1318 – Coleophora heinrichella
- 1319 – Coleophora monardae
- 1320 – Coleophora lynosyridella
- 1321 – Coleophora mcdunnoughiella
- 1322 – Coleophora entoloma
- 1323 – Coleophora sparsipuncta
- 1324 – Coleophora crinita
- 1325 – Coleophora seminella
- 1326 – Coleophora atriplicivora
- 1327 – Coleophora suaedae
- 1328 – Coleophora acamtopappi
- 1329 – Coleophora quadristrigella
- 1330 – Coleophora simulans
- 1331 – Coleophora versurella
- 1332 – Coleophora ericoides
- 1333 – Coleophora subapicis
- 1334 – Coleophora triplicis
- 1335 – Coleophora puberuloides
- 1336 – Coleophora texanella
- 1337 – Coleophora duplicis
- 1338 – Coleophora rugosae
- 1339 – Coleophora acuminatoides
- 1340 – Coleophora bidens
- 1341 – Coleophora nemorella
- 1342 – Coleophora intermediella
- 1343 – Coleophora dextrella
- 1344 – Coleophora detractella
- 1345 – Coleophora prepostera
- 1346 – Coleophora trilineella
- 1347 – Coleophora littorella
- 1348 – Coleophora salinoidella
- 1349 – Coleophora lineapulvella
- 1350 – Coleophora quadruplex
- 1351 – Coleophora chambersella
- 1352 – Coleophora sparsipulvella
- 1353 – Coleophora ochrostriata
- 1354 – Coleophora basistrigella
- 1355 – Coleophora nigrostriata
- 1356 – Coleophora bella
- 1357 – Coleophora argentialbella
- 1358 – Coleophora quadrilineella
- 1359 – Coleophora cervinella
- 1360 – Coleophora tenuis
- 1361 – Coleophora borea
- 1362 – Coleophora sparsiatomella
- 1363 – Coleophora pulchricornis
- 1364 – Coleophora vagans
- 1365 – Coleophora cratipennella, streaked coleophora moth
- 1365.1 – Coleophora tamesis
- 1366 – Coleophora benestrigatella
- 1367 – Coleophora brunneipennis
- 1368 – Coleophora bidentella
- 1369 – Coleophora suaedicola
- 1370 – Coleophora biforis
- 1371 – Coleophora infuscatella
- 1372 – Coleophora coenosipennella
- 1373 – Coleophora contrariella
- 1374 – Coleophora sexdentatella
- 1375 – Coleophora caespititiella
- 1376 – Coleophora latronella
- 1377 – Coleophora glissandella
- 1378 – Coleophora glaucicolella
- 1379 – Coleophora alticolella
- 1380 – Coleophora fagicorticella
- 1381 – Coleophora bispinatella
- 1382 – Coleophora dentiferoides
- 1383 – Coleophora luteocostella
- 1384 – Coleophora concolorella
- 1385 – Coleophora maritella
- 1386 – Coleophora viridicuprella
- 1387 – Coleophora mayrella, metallic coleophora moth
- 1388 – Coleophora trifolii, large clover casebearer moth
- 1389 – Coleophora apicialbella
- 1390 – Coleophora portulacae
- 1391 – Coleophora aeneusella
- 1392 – Coleophora aenusella
- 1393 – Coleophora albacostella
- 1394 – Coleophora biminimmaculella
- 1395 – Coleophora fuscostrigella
- 1396 – Coleophora indefinitella
- 1396.1 – Coleophora xyridella
- 1397 – Scythris inornatella
- 1398 – Coleophora octagonella, octagonal casemaker moth
- 1398.1 – Coleophora arizoniella
- 1398.2 – Coleophora deauratella
- 1398.3 – Coleophora ladonia
- 1398.4 – Coleophora ramitella
- 1398.5 – Coleophora timarella
- 1398.6 – Coleophora alabama
- 1398.7 – Coleophora klimeschiella, Russian thistle casebearer moth
- 1398.8 – Coleophora parthenica, Russian thistle stem miner moth
- 1398.9 – Coleophora spinella, apple and plum casebearer moth
- 1399 – Batrachedra praeangusta
- 1400 – Batrachedra striolata
- 1401 – Batrachedra curvilineella
- 1402 – Batrachedra folia
- 1403 – Batrachedra salicipomonella
- 1404 – Batrachedra illusor
- 1405 – Batrachedra testor
- 1406 – Batrachedra busiris
- 1407 – Batrachedra calator
- 1408 – Batrachedra concitata
- 1409 – Batrachedra elucus
- 1410 – Batrachedra garritor
- 1411 – Batrachedra scitator
- 1412 – Batrachedra hageter
- 1413 – Batrachedra enormis, large batrachedra moth
- 1414 – Batrachedra mathesoni
- 1415 – Batrachedra libator
- 1416 – Batrachedra decoctor
- 1416.1 – Batrachedra pinicolella
- 1417 – Chedra inquisitor
- 1418 – Chedra pensor
- 1419 – Duospina abolitor
- 1420 – Duospina trichella
- 1421 – Homaledra heptathalama, exclamation moth
- 1422 – Homaledra sabalella, palm leaf skeletonizer moth

== Momphidae ==
- 1423 – Mompha albapalpella
- 1423.1 – Mompha achlyognoma
- 1424 – Mompha albella
- 1425 – Mompha annulata
- 1426 – Mompha argentimaculella
- 1427 – Mompha bicristatella
- 1428 – Mompha bifasciella
- 1429 – Mompha bottimeri, Bottimer's mompha moth
- 1430 – Mompha brevivittella
- 1431 – Mompha canicinctella
- 1432 – Mompha capella
- 1433 – Mompha cephalonthiella, buttonbush leafminer moth
- 1434 – Mompha circumscriptella, circumscript mompha moth
- 1435 – Mompha claudiella
- 1435.1 – Mompha cleidarotrypa
- 1436 – Mompha coloradella
- 1437 – Mompha communis
- 1438 – Mompha conturbatella, fireweed mompha moth
- 1439 – Mompha deceptella
- 1440 – Mompha definitella
- 1441 – Mompha difficilis
- 1442 – Mompha edithella
- 1443 – Mompha eloisella, red-streaked mompha moth
- 1443.1 – Mompha epilobiella
- 1444 – Mompha ignotilisella
- 1445 – Mompha luciferella
- 1446 – Mompha metallifera
- 1446.1 – Mompha franclemonti
- 1446.2 – Mompha powelli
- 1447 – Mompha minimella
- 1448 – Mompha murtfeldtella
- 1448.1 – Mompha nodicolella
- 1449 – Mompha nuptialis
- 1450 – Mompha passerella
- 1451 – Mompha pecosella
- 1452 – Mompha purpuriella
- 1453 – Mompha rufocristatella
- 1454 – Mompha sexstrigella
- 1454.1 – Mompha nancyae
- 1454.2 – Mompha solomoni
- 1455 – Mompha stellella
- 1456 – Mompha terminella
- 1457 – Mompha idaei
- 1457.1 – Mompha raschkiella
- 1458 – Mompha unifasciella
- 1459 – Synallagma busckiella
- 1460 – Blastodacna bicristatella
- 1461 – Blastodacna curvilineella

== Cosmopterigidae ==
- 1461.1 – Blastodacna atra
- 1461.2 – Blastodacna hellerella
- 1462 – Chrysoclista cambiella
- 1463 – Chrysoclista linneella, linden bark-borer moth
- 1464 – Chrysoclista villella
- no number yet – Chrysoclista grandis
- 1465 – Haplochrois bipunctella
- 1466 – Antequera acertella
- 1467 – Euclemensia bassettella, kermes scale moth
- 1468 – Euclemensia schwarziella
- 1469 – Cosmopterix nitens
- 1470 – Cosmopterix sinelinea
- 1471 – Cosmopterix molybdina
- 1472 – Cosmopterix pulchrimella, beautiful cosmopterix moth
- 1473 – Cosmopterix bendidia (=Cosmopterix astrapias)
- 1474 – Cosmopterix attenuatella
- 1475 – Cosmopterix clandestinella
- 1476 – Cosmopterix montisella
- 1477 – Cosmopterix magophila
- 1478 – Cosmopterix gracilens (=Cosmopterix inopis)
- 1479 – Cosmopterix dapifera
- 1480 – Cosmopterix delicatella
- 1481 – Cosmopterix dicacula (=Cosmopterix callichalca)
- 1482 – Cosmopterix lespedezae
- 1483 – Cosmopterix opulenta
- 1484 – Cosmopterix chisosensis
- 1485 – Cosmopterix quadrilineella
- 1486 – Cosmopterix minutella
- 1487 – Cosmopterix abdita (=Cosmopterix teligera)
- 1488 – Cosmopterix inopis
- 1489 – Cosmopterix chalybaeella
- 1490 – Cosmopterix gemmiferella
- 1491 – Cosmopterix bacata
- 1492 – Cosmopterix damnosa
- 1493 – Cosmopterix clemensella, Clemens' cosmopterix moth
- 1494 – Cosmopterix scirpicola
- 1495 – Cosmopterix ebriola
- 1496 – Cosmopterix fernaldella, Fernald's cosmopterix moth
- 1497 – Cosmopterix floridanella
- 1498 – Cosmopterix facunda
- no number – Cosmopterix erinome
- no number – Cosmopterix thelxinoe
- 1499 – Pebops ipomoeae
- 1500 – Tanygona lignicolorella
- 1501 – Eralea albalineella
- 1502 – Eralea abludo
- 1503 – Melanocinclis lineigera
- 1504 – Melanocinclis nigrilineella
- 1505 – Melanocinclis sparsa
- 1506 – Melanocinclis gnoma
- 1507 – Melanocinclis vibex
- 1508 – Stagmatophora sexnotella
- 1509 – Stagmatophora wyattella, Wyatt's stagmatophora moth
- 1510 – Stagmatophora iridella
- 1511 – Stagmatophora enchrysa
- 1511.1 – Eteobalea intermediella
- 1511.2 – Eteobalea serratella
- 1512 – Pyroderces rileyi, pink scavenger caterpillar moth
- 1513 – Pyroderces badia, Florida pink scavenger moth
- 1514 – Pyroderces albistrigella
- 1515 – Limnaecia phragmitella, shy cosmet moth
- 1516 – Teladoma helianthi
- 1517 – Teladoma astigmatica
- 1518 – Teladoma tonia
- 1519 – Teladoma incana
- 1520 – Teladoma murina
- 1521 – Teladoma habra
- 1522 – Teladoma nebula
- 1523 – Teladoma exigua
- 1524 – Triclonella pergandeella, sweetclover root borer moth
- 1525 – Triclonella xuthocelis
- 1526 – Triclonella antidectis
- 1527 – Triclonella determinatella
- 1528 – Triclonella bicoloripennis
- 1529 – Anoncia conia
- 1530 – Anoncia brunneipes
- 1531 – Anoncia sphacelina
- 1532 – Anoncia fasciata
- 1533 – Anoncia alboligula
- 1534 – Anoncia slales
- 1535 – Anoncia glacialis
- 1536 – Anoncia bitoqua
- 1537 – Anoncia porriginosa
- 1538 – Anoncia flegax
- 1539 – Anoncia aciculata
- 1540 – Anoncia mones
- 1541 – Anoncia naclia
- 1542 – Anoncia callida
- 1543 – Anoncia nocticola
- 1544 – Anoncia nebritis
- 1545 – Anoncia psepsa
- 1546 – Anoncia leucoritis
- 1547 – Anoncia longa
- 1548 – Anoncia furvicosta
- 1549 – Anoncia diveni
- 1550 – Anoncia orites
- 1551 – Anoncia fregeis
- 1552 – Anoncia loexya
- 1553 – Anoncia noscres
- 1554 – Anoncia episcia
- 1555 – Anoncia venis
- 1556 – Anoncia piperata
- 1557 – Anoncia mosa
- 1558 – Anoncia smogops
- 1559 – Anoncia psentia
- 1559.1 – Anoncia texanella
- 1560 – Periploca orichalcella
- 1561 – Periploca arsa
- 1562 – Periploca ceanothiella
- 1563 – Periploca gleditschiaeella
- 1564 – Periploca intermedia
- 1565 – Periploca repanda
- 1566 – Periploca hostiata
- 1567 – Periploca teres
- 1568 – Periploca tridens
- 1569 – Periploca hortatrix
- 1570 – Periploca opinatrix
- 1571 – Periploca atrata
- 1572 – Periploca mimula
- 1573 – Periploca laeta
- 1574 – Periploca cata
- 1575 – Periploca devia
- 1576 – Periploca soror
- 1577 – Periploca nigra
- 1578 – Periploca fessa
- 1579 – Periploca gulosa
- 1580 – Periploca facula
- 1581 – Periploca juniperae
- 1582 – Periploca funebris
- 1583 – Periploca serrulata
- 1584 – Periploca dentella
- 1585 – Periploca dipapha
- 1586 – Periploca labes
- 1587 – Siskiwitia alticolans
- 1588 – Siskiwitia latebra
- 1589 – Siskiwitia falcata
- 1590 – Pristen corusca
- 1591 – Synploca gumia
- 1592 – Stilbosis juvantis
- 1593 – Stilbosis dulcedo
- 1594 – Stilbosis venifica
- 1595 – Stilbosis venatrix
- 1596 – Stilbosis ostryaeella, ironwood leafminer moth
- 1597 – Stilbosis quadricustatella
- 1598 – Stilbosis stipator
- 1599 – Stilbosis risor
- 1600 – Stilbosis victor
- 1601 – Stilbosis placatrix
- 1602 – Stilbosis sagana
- 1603 – Stilbosis rhynchosiae
- 1604 – Stilbosis extensa
- 1605 – Stilbosis pagina
- 1606 – Stilbosis ornatrix
- 1607 – Stilbosis scleroma
- 1608 – Stilbosis rotunda
- 1609 – Stilbosis tesquella
- 1610 – Stilbosis nubila
- 1611 – Stilbosis lonchocarpella
- 1612 – Chrysopeleia purpuriella
- 1613 – Walshia particornella
- 1614 – Walshia elegans
- 1615 – Walshia miscecolorella, sweetclover root borer moth
- 1616 – Walshia amorphella
- 1617 – Walshia floridensis
- 1618 – Walshia exemplata
- 1619 – Walshia similis
- 1620 – Walshia dispar
- 1621 – Nepotula secura
- 1622 – Afeda biloba
- 1623 – Perimede erransella
- 1624 – Perimede battis
- 1625 – Perimede latris
- 1626 – Perimede grandis
- 1627 – Perimede parilis
- 1628 – Perimede circitor
- 1629 – Perimede erema
- 1630 – Perimede maniola
- 1631 – Perimede ricina
- 1632 – Perimede falcata
- 1633 – Sorhagenia nimbosa, midrib gall moth
- 1634 – Sorhagenia cracens
- 1635 – Sorhagenia daedala
- 1636 – Sorhagenia baucidis
- 1637 – Sorhagenia pexa
- 1638 – Ithome concolorella, kiawe flower moth
- 1639 – Ithome curvipunctella
- 1640 – Ithome ferax
- 1641 – Ithome edax
- 1642 – Ithome aquila
- 1643 – Ithome lassula
- 1644 – Ithome simulatrix
- 1645 – Obithome punctiferella
- 1647 – Calosima albapenella
- 1648 – Asymmetrura albilineata

== Scythrididae ==
- 1649 – Rhamphura altisierrae
- 1650 – Scythris anthracina
- 1651 – Scythris inspersella
- 1652 – Scythris basilaris
- 1652.1 – Scythris brevistrigella
- 1653 – Scythris charon
- 1654 – Neoscythris confinis
- 1654.1 – Neoscythris euthia
- 1655 – Scythris eboracensis
- 1657 – Arotrura eburnea
- 1657.1 – Arotrura powelli
- 1657.2 – Arotrura atascosa
- 1657.3 – Arotrura divaricata
- 1658 – Neoscythris fissirostris
- 1659 – Scythris fuscicomella
- 1660 – Asymmetrura graminivorella
- 1662 – Landryia impositella
- 1662.1 – Landryia matutella
- 1663 – Scythris interrupta
- 1664 – Scythris noricella
- 1665 – Scythris mixaula
- 1666 – Rhamphura ochristriata
- 1667 – Arotrura oxyplecta
- 1667.1 – Arotrura formidabilis
- 1667.2 – Arotrura longissima
- 1668 – Scythris immaculatella
- 1669 – Rhamphura perspicillella
- 1670 – Scythris pilosella
- 1671 – Scythris piratica
- 1672 – Neoscythris planipenella
- 1673 – Scythris limbella, chenopodium scythris moth
- 1674 – Asymmetrura reducta
- 1675 – Asymmetrura scintillifera
- 1676 – Arotrura sponsella
- 1676.1 – Arotrura balli
- 1676.2 – Arotrura hymenata
- 1677 – Rhamphura suffusa
- 1678 – Scythris trivinctella, banded scythris moth
- 1679 – Scythris ypsilon
- 1680 – Areniscythris brachypteris

== Gelechiidae ==
- 1681 – Nealyda bifidella
- 1682 – Nealyda kinzelella
- 1683 – Nealyda phytolaccae
- 1684 – Nealyda pisoniae
- 1685 – Metzneria lappella, burdock seedhead moth
- 1686 – Metzneria paucipunctella
- 1687 – Megacraspedus plutella
- 1688 – Isophrictis actiella
- 1689 – Isophrictis actinopa
- 1690 – Isophrictis anteliella
- 1691 – Isophrictis canicostella
- 1692 – Isophrictis cilialineella
- 1693 – Isophrictis dietziella
- 1694 – Isophrictis magnella
- 1695 – Isophrictis modesta
- 1696 – Isophrictis occidentalis
- 1697 – Isophrictis pallidastrigella
- 1698 – Isophrictis pallidella
- 1699 – Isophrictis pennella
- 1700 – Isophrictis rudbeckiella
- 1701 – Isophrictis sabulella
- 1702 – Isophrictis similiella
- 1703 – Isophrictis striatella
- 1704 – Isophrictis tophella
- 1705 – Isophrictis trimaculella
- 1706 – Monochroa absconditella
- 1707 – Monochroa angustipennella
- 1708 – Monochroa disconotella
- 1709 – Monochroa discriminata
- 1710 – Monochroa gilvolinella
- 1711 – Monochroa fragariae, strawberry crown miner moth
- 1712 W – Monochroa harrisonella
- 1713 – Monochroa monactis
- 1714 – Monochroa perterrita
- 1715 W – Monochroa placidella
- 1716 – Monochroa quinquepunctella
- 1717 – Chrysoesthia drurella, goosefoot leafminer moth
- 1718 – Chrysoesthia lingulacella
- 1719 – Chrysoesthia sexguttella, orache leafminer moth
- 1720 – Chrysoesthia versicolorella
- 1721 – Enchrysa dissectella
- 1722 – Theisoa constrictella
- 1723 – Theisoa multifasciella
- 1724 – Theisoa pallidochrella
- 1725 – Stereomita andropogonis
- 1726 – Aristotelia adceanotha
- 1727 – Aristotelia adenostomae
- 1728 – Aristotelia amelanchierella
- 1729 – Aristotelia aquosa
- 1730 – Aristotelia argentifera
- 1731 – Aristotelia bifasciella
- 1732 – Aristotelia callens
- 1733 – Aristotelia callirrhoda
- 1733.1 – Aristotelia corallina
- 1734 – Aristotelia devexella
- 1735 – Aristotelia eldorada
- 1736 – Aristotelia elegantella, elegant aristotelia moth
- 1737 – Aristotelia eumeris
- 1738 – Aristotelia fungivorella
- 1739 – Aristotelia hexacopa
- 1740 – Aristotelia intermediella
- 1741 – Aristotelia iospora
- 1742 – Aristotelia isopelta
- 1743 – Aristotelia ivae
- 1744 – Aristotelia lespedezae
- 1745 – Aristotelia lindanella
- 1746 – Aristotelia melanaphra
- 1747 – Aristotelia molestella
- 1748 – Aristotelia monilella
- 1749 – Aristotelia nigrobasiella
- 1750 – Aristotelia ochroxysta
- 1752 – Aristotelia physaliella
- 1753 – Aristotelia planitia
- 1754 – Aristotelia primipilana
- 1755 – Aristotelia psoraleae
- 1756 – Aristotelia pudibundella
- 1757 – Aristotelia pullusella
- 1758 – Aristotelia rhamnina
- 1759 – Aristotelia rhoisella
- 1760 – Aristotelia robusta
- 1761 – Aristotelia roseosuffusella
- 1762 – Aristotelia rubidella
- 1763 – Aristotelia salicifungiella
- 1764 – Aristotelia urbaurea
- 1765 – Numata bipunctella
- 1766 – Glauce pectenalaeella
- 1767 – Naera fuscocristatella
- 1768 – Evippe abdita
- 1769 – Evippe laudatella
- 1770 – Evippe leuconota
- 1771 – Evippe prunifoliella
- 1772 – Agnippe biscolorella
- 1773 – Agnippe crinella
- 1774 – Agnippe evippeella
- 1775 – Agnippe fuscopulvella
- 1776 – Tosca elachistella
- 1777 – Tosca plutonella
- 1778 – Tosca pollostella
- 1779 – Argyrolacia bifida
- 1780 – Recurvaria ceanothiella
- 1781 – Recurvaria consimilis
- 1782 – Recurvaria francisca
- 1783 – Recurvaria nanella, lesser bud moth
- 1784 – Recurvaria stibomorpha
- 1785 – Recurvaria taphiopis
- 1786 – Recurvaria vestigata
- 1787 – Coleotechnites albicostatus, white-edged coleotechnites moth
- 1788 – Coleotechnites alnifructella
- 1789 – Coleotechnites apicitripunctella, green hemlock needleminer moth
- 1790 – Coleotechnites ardas
- 1791 – Coleotechnites argentiabella
- 1792 – Coleotechnites atrupictella
- 1793 – Coleotechnites australis
- 1794 – Coleotechnites bacchariella, coyote brush twig borer moth
- 1795 – Coleotechnites biopes
- 1796 – Coleotechnites blastovora
- 1797 – Coleotechnites canusella, banded jack-pine needleminer moth
- 1798 – Coleotechnites carbonarius
- 1799 – Coleotechnites chilcotti, Chilcott's coleotechnites moth
- 1800 – Coleotechnites citriella
- 1801 – Coleotechnites colubrinae
- 1802 – Coleotechnites condignella
- 1803 – Coleotechnites coniferella, conifer coleotechnites moth
- 1804 – Coleotechnites cristatella
- 1805 – Coleotechnites vagatioella
- 1806 – Coleotechnites ducharmei
- 1806.1 – Coleotechnites edulicola
- 1807 – Coleotechnites elucidella
- 1808 – Coleotechnites eryngiella
- 1809 – Coleotechnites florae, coleotechnites flower moth
- 1810 – Coleotechnites gallicola
- 1811 – Coleotechnites gibsonella
- 1812 – Coleotechnites granti
- 1813 – Coleotechnites huntella
- 1814 – Coleotechnites invictella
- 1815 – Coleotechnites juniperella
- 1816 – Coleotechnites laricis, orange larch tubemaker moth
- 1817 – Coleotechnites lewisi
- 1818 – Coleotechnites mackiei
- 1819 – Coleotechnites macleodi, brown hemlock needleminer moth
- 1820 – Coleotechnites martini
- 1821 – Coleotechnites milleri, lodgepole needleminer moth
- 1822 – Coleotechnites moreonella
- 1823 – Coleotechnites nigritus
- 1824 – Coleotechnites obliquistrigella
- 1825 – Coleotechnites occidentis
- 1826 – Coleotechnites piceaella, orange spruce needleminer moth
- 1827 – Coleotechnites pinella
- 1827.1 – Coleotechnites ponderosae
- 1828 – Coleotechnites quercivorella
- 1829 – Coleotechnites resinosae, red pine needleminer moth
- 1830 – Coleotechnites stanfordia
- 1831 – Coleotechnites starki
- 1832 – Coleotechnites thujaella, brown cedar leafminer moth
- 1833 – Coleotechnites variella
- 1834 – Sinoe robiniella
- 1834.1 – Sinoe chambersi
- 1834.2 – Sinoe kwakae
- no number yet – Sinoe capsana
- 1835 – Exoteleia burkei
- 1836 – Exoteleia californica
- 1837 – Exoteleia dodecella, pine bud moth
- 1838 – Exoteleia graphicella
- 1839 – Exoteleia nepheos, pine candle moth
- 1840 – Exoteleia pinifoliella, pine needleminer moth
- 1840.1 – Exoteleia anomala
- 1841 – Trypanisma prudens
- 1842 – Taygete attributella
- 1843 – Taygete citrinella
- 1844 – Taygete decemmaculella
- 1845 – Taygete gallaegenitella
- 1846 – Taygete saundersella
- 1847 – Taygete sylvicolella
- 1848 – Leucogoniella californica
- 1849 – Leucogoniella distincta
- 1850 – Leucogoniella subsimella
- 1851 – Arogalea cristifasciella, stripe-backed moth
- 1852 – Athrips mouffetella, ten-spotted honeysuckle moth
- 1853 – Athrips pruinosella
- 1854 – Athrips rancidella, cotoneaster webworm moth
- 1855 – Telphusa alexandriacella
- 1856 – Telphusa fasciella
- 1857 – Telphusa latifasciella, white-banded telphusa moth
- 1858 – Telphusa longifasciella
- 1859 – Telphusa sedulitella
- no number – Telphusa nigrimaculata
- 1860 – Pseudochelaria arbutina
- 1861 – Pseudochelaria manzanitae
- 1862 – Pseudochelaria pennsylvanica
- 1863 – Pseudochelaria scabrella
- 1864 – Pseudochelaria walsinghami
- 1864.1 – Gnorimoschema herbichi
- 1865 – Neotelphusa praefixa
- 1866 – Neotelphusa querciella
- 1867 – Pseudotelphusa amelanchierella
- 1868 – Pseudotelphusa basifasciella
- 1869 – Pseudotelphusa belangerella
- 1870 – Pseudotelphusa betulella
- 1871 – Pseudotelphusa fuscopunctella
- 1872 – Pseudotelphusa incana
- 1873 – Pseudotelphusa palliderosacella
- 1874 – Pseudotelphusa quercinigracella
- 1874.1 – Arcutelphusa talladega
- 1874.2 – Carpatolechia fugitivella
- 1875 – Xenolechia aethiops
- 1876 – Xenolechia quinquecristatella
- 1877 – Xenolechia basistrigella
- 1878 – Xenolechia ontariensis
- 1879 – Xenolechia querciphaga
- 1880 – Xenolechia velatella
- no number – Xenolechia ceanothiae
- 1880.1 – Stenolechia bathrodyas
- 1881 – Teleiodes sequax, crepuscular rock-rose moth
- 1881.1 – Teleiodes proximella
- 1882 – Teleiopsis baldiana
- 1883 – Prolita barnesiella
- 1884 – Prolita deoia
- 1885 – Prolita dialis
- 1886 – Prolita geniata
- 1887 – Prolita incicur
- 1888 – Prolita invariabilis
- 1889 – Prolita jubata
- 1890 – Prolita maenadis
- 1891 – Prolita nefrens
- 1892 – Prolita obnubila
- 1893 – Prolita pagella
- 1894 – Prolita princeps
- 1895 – Prolita puertella
- 1896 – Prolita recens
- 1897 – Prolita rectistrigella
- 1898 – Prolita sexpunctella
- 1899 – Prolita sironae
- 1900 – Prolita texanella
- 1901 – Prolita thaliae
- 1902 – Prolita variabilis
- 1903 – Prolita veledae
- 1904 – Arla diversella
- 1905 – Arla tenuicornis
- 1906 – Neodactylota basilica
- 1907 – Neodactylota egena
- 1908 – Neodactylota liguritrix
- 1909 – Neodactylota snellenella
- 1910 – Eudactylota abstemia
- 1911 – Eudactylota barberella
- 1912 – Eudactylota diadota
- 1913 – Eudactylota iobapta
- 1914 – Friseria acaciella
- 1915 – Friseria caieta
- 1916 – Friseria cockerelli, mesquite webworm moth
- 1917 – Friseria nona
- 1918 – Rifseria fuscotaeniaella
- 1919 – Sriferia cockerella
- 1920 – Sriferia fulmenella
- 1921 – Sriferia oxymeris
- 1922 – Bryotropha branella
- 1922.1 – Bryotropha plantariella
- 1922.2 – Bryotropha galbanella
- 1922.3 – Bryotropha gemella
- 1923 – Bryotropha similis
- 1923.1 – Bryotropha hodgesi
- 1923.2 – Bryotropha altitudophila
- 1926 – Deltophora duplicata
- 1927 – Deltophora glandiferella
- 1928 – Deltophora sella
- 1929 – Gelechia albisparsella
- 1930 – Gelechia anarsiella
- 1931 – Gelechia badiomaculella
- 1932 – Gelechia benitella
- 1933 – Gelechia bianulella
- 1934 – Gelechia bistrigella
- 1936 – Gelechia capiteochrella
- 1937 – Gelechia caudatae
- 1938 – Gelechia desiliens
- 1939 – Gelechia discostrigella
- 1940 – Gelechia dromicella
- 1941 – Gelechia dyariella
- 1942 – Gelechia flexurella
- 1943 – Gelechia gracula
- 1944 – Gelechia grisaeella
- 1945 – Gelechia griseochrella
- 1946 – Gelechia lynceella
- 1947 – Gelechia maculatusella
- 1948 – Gelechia mandella
- 1949 – Gelechia mimella
- 1950 – Gelechia monella
- 1951 – Gelechia mundata
- 1952 – Gelechia obscurella
- 1954 – Gelechia ocherfuscella
- 1955 – Gelechia packardella
- 1956 – Gelechia pallidagriseella
- 1957 – Gelechia palpialbella
- 1958 – Gelechia panella
- 1960 – Gelechia ribesella
- 1961 – Gelechia rileyella
- 1962 – Gelechia sabinella, juniper gelechiid moth
- 1963 – Gelechia thoracestrigella
- 1964 – Gelechia thymiata
- 1965 – Gelechia unistrigella
- 1966 – Gelechia versutella
- 1967 – Gelechia wacoella
- 1968 – Gnorimoschema alaricella
- 1969 – Gnorimoschema albangulatum
- 1969.1 – Gnorimoschema albestre
- 1970 – Gnorimoschema albimarginella
- 1971 – Gnorimoschema ambrosiella
- 1971.1 – Gnorimoschema anomale
- 1971.2 – Gnorimoschema assimile
- 1971.3 – Gnorimoschema aterrimum
- 1971.4 – Gnorimoschema baccariselloides
- 1972 – Gnorimoschema baccharisella, coyote brush gall moth
- 1973 – Gnorimoschema banksiella
- 1974 – Gnorimoschema batanella
- 1974.1 – Gnorimoschema brachiatum
- 1975 – Gnorimoschema busckiella
- 1975.1 – Gnorimoschema clavatum
- 1976 – Gnorimoschema collinusella
- 1977 – Gnorimoschema compsomorpha
- 1978 – Gnorimoschema contrarium
- 1979 – Gnorimoschema coquillettella
- 1979.1 – Gnorimoschema crypticum
- 1979.2 – Gnorimoschema curiosum
- 1979.3 – Gnorimoschema debenedicti
- 1980 – Gnorimoschema dudiella
- 1980.1 – Gnorimoschema elatior
- 1981 – Gnorimoschema marmorella
- 1982 – Gnorimoschema ericameriae
- 1982.1 – Gnorimoschema ericoidesi
- 1983 – Gnorimoschema faustella
- 1983.1 – Gnorimoschema ferrugineum
- 1984 – Gnorimoschema florella
- 1984.1 – Gnorimoschema foliatum
- 1985 – Gnorimoschema gallaeasterella
- 1986 – Gnorimoschema gallaesolidaginis, goldenrod gall moth
- 1986.1 – Gnorimoschema gallaespeciosum
- 1986.2 – Gnorimoschema geminum
- 1986.3 – Gnorimoschema generale
- 1987 – Gnorimoschema gibsoniella
- 1987.1 – Gnorimoschema gracile
- 1987.2 – Gnorimoschema grindeliae
- 1988 – Gnorimoschema grisella
- 1989 – Gnorimoschema inexpertum
- 1989.1 – Gnorimoschema intermedium
- 1989.2 – Gnorimoschema interrogationum
- 1989.3 – Gnorimoschema jocelynae
- 1989.4 – Gnorimoschema lateritium
- 1989.5 – Gnorimoschema ligulatum
- 1990 – Neoschema klotsi
- 1990.1 – Neoschema powelli
- 1991 – Gnorimoschema lipatiella
- 1991.1 – Gnorimoschema lobatum
- 1992 – Gnorimoschema milleriella
- 1993 – Gnorimoschema minor
- 1993.1 – Gnorimoschema nanulum
- 1994 – Gnorimoschema nordlandicolella
- 1994.1 – Gnorimoschema novajorum
- 1994.2 – Gnorimoschema obscurior
- 1995 – Gnorimoschema octomaculella
- 1995.1 – Gnorimoschema ovinum
- 1995.2 – Gnorimoschema paternale
- 1996 – Gnorimoschema pedmontella
- 1996.1 – Gnorimoschema penetrans
- 1996.2 – Gnorimoschema perditum
- 1996.3 – Gnorimoschema petiolatum
- 1996.4 – Gnorimoschema pocketosum
- 1996.5 – Gnorimoschema powelli
- 1996.6 – Gnorimoschema reichli
- 1996.7 – Gnorimoschema rotundatum
- 1997 – Gnorimoschema salinaris
- 1998 – Gnorimoschema saphirinella
- 1998.1 – Gnorimoschema segregatum
- 1999 – Gnorimoschema semicyclionella
- 1999.1 – Eurysaccoides alternatus
- 2000 – Gnorimoschema septentrionella
- 2001 – Gnorimoschema serratipalpella
- 2001.1 – Gnorimoschema signatum
- 2001.2 – Gnorimoschema siskiouense
- 2001.3 – Gnorimoschema slabaughi
- 2001.4 – Gnorimoschema spinosum
- 2001.5 – Gnorimoschema huffmanellum
- 2002 – Gnorimoschema splendoriferella
- 2003 – Gnorimoschema sporomochla
- 2003.1 – Gnorimoschema stigmaticum
- 2004 – Gnorimoschema subterraneum
- 2004.1 – Gnorimoschema tediosum
- 2004.2 – Gnorimoschema tenerum
- 2005 – Gnorimoschema terracottella
- 2005.1 – Gnorimoschema triforceps
- 2005.2 – Gnorimoschema trilobatum
- 2006 – Gnorimoschema triocellella
- 2006.1 – Gnorimoschema tunicatum
- 2007 – Gnorimoschema valesiella
- 2008 – Gnorimoschema vastificum
- 2009 – Gnorimoschema versicolorella
- 2009.1 – Gnorimoschema wagneri
- 2010 – Gnorimoschema washingtoniella
- 2011 – Phthorimaea operculella, potato tuberworm moth
- 2012 – Scrobipalpula artemisiella, thyme moth
- 2012.1 – Scrobipalpula antiocha
- 2013 – Tuta chiquitella
- 2013.1 – Tuta chiquitelloides
- 2013.2 – Tuta elaborata
- 2013.3 – Tuta insularis
- 2013.4 – Tuta isolata
- 2013.5 – Tuta spinosa
- 2013.6 – Tuta totalis
- 2013.7 – Tuta truncata
- 2014 – Scrobipalpula erigeronella
- 2014.1 – Scrobipalpula gutierreziae
- 2015 – Scrobipalpula henshawiella
- 2016 – Scrobipalpula hodgesi
- 2017 – Scrobipalpulopsis lutescella
- 2017.1 – Scrobipalpulopsis lycii
- 2018 – Scrobipalpula ochroschista
- 2018.1 – Scrobipalpula psilella
- 2019 – Scrobipalpula polemoniella
- 2020 – Scrobipalpula potentella
- 2021 – Scrobipalpula radiatella
- 2022 – Scrobipalpula sacculicola
- 2023 – Scrobipalpula semirosea
- 2024 – Euscrobipalpa atriplex
- 2025 – Euscrobipalpa atriplicella
- 2025.1 – Euscrobipalpa artemisiella
- 2026 – Scrobipalpa consueta
- 2027 – Scrobipalpa macromaculata
- 2028 – Scrobipalpa monumentella
- 2029 – Euscrobipalpa obsoletella
- 2029.1 – Euscrobipalpa instabilella
- 2029.2 – Euscrobipalpa arenacearella
- 2029.3 – Nevadopalpa striata
- 2029.4 – Nevadopalpa minor
- 2029.5 – Nevadopalpa albula
- 2029.6 – Nevadopalpa alboaura
- 2029.7 – Nevadopalpa deaurata
- 2029.8 – Nevadopalpa maculata
- 2029.9 – Nevadopalpa nevadana
- 2030 – Scrobipalpa scutellariaeela
- 2030.1 – Neopalpa neonata
- 2030.2 – Microcraspedus fontosus
- 2030.3 – Eurysaccoides gallaespinosae
- 2031 – Exceptia neopetrella
- 2031.1 – Exceptia sisterina
- 2032 – Symmetrischema capsicum, pepper flowerbud moth
- 2033 – Symmetrischema fercularium
- 2034 – Symmetrischema inexpectatum
- 2035 – Symmetrischema lavernella
- 2036 – Symmetrischema lectuliferum
- 2037 – Symmetrischema pallidochrella
- 2038 – Symmetrischema plaesiosema
- 2038.1 – Symmetrischema tangolias
- 2039 – Symmetrischema striatella
- 2039.1 – Symmetrischema kendallorum
- 2040 – Caryocolum cassella
- 2041 – Caryocolum protecta
- 2041.1 – Caryocolum marmorea
- 2041.2 – Caryocolum nearcticum
- 2041.3 – Caryocolum proxima
- 2042 – Caryocolum pullatella
- 2043 – Scrobipalpopsis arnicella
- 2044 – Ptycerata busckella
- 2045 – Ptycerata petrella
- 2046 – Scrobipalpopsis tetradymiella
- 2046.1 – Scrobipalpopsis madiae
- 2046.2 – Scrobipalpopsis interposita
- 2047 – Keiferia lycopersicella, tomato pinworm moth
- 2047.1 – Keiferia elmorei
- 2048 – Keiferia altisolani
- 2048.1 – Keiferia georgei
- 2049 – Keiferia glochinella, eggplant leafminer moth
- 2050 – Keiferia inconspicuella
- no number – Keiferia educata
- no number – Keiferia powelli
- 2051 – Frumenta nephelomicta
- 2052 – Frumenta nundinella
- 2053 – Agonochaetia conspersa
- 2054 – Chionodes abdominella
- 2055 – Chionodes abella
- 2057 – Chionodes acerella
- 2057.1 – Chionodes metoecus
- 2058 – Chionodes acrina
- 2058.1 – Chionodes adam
- 2058.2 – Chionodes altor
- 2058.3 – Chionodes cautor
- 2058.4 – Chionodes irreptor
- 2058.5 – Chionodes baro
- 2058.6 – Chionodes secutor
- 2059 – Chionodes agriodes
- 2059.1 – Chionodes rupex
- 2059.2 – Chionodes gratus
- 2059.3 – Chionodes cusor
- 2059.4 – Chionodes fimus
- 2059.5 – Microcraspedus powelli
- 2060 – Chionodes arenella
- 2061 – Chionodes argentipunctella
- 2061.1 – Chionodes hapsus
- 2061.2 – Chionodes abitus
- 2061.3 – Chionodes suasor
- 2061.4 – Chionodes percultor
- 2062 – Chionodes aristella
- 2063 – Chionodes bicolor
- 2064 – Chionodes bicostomaculella
- 2065 – Chionodes braunella
- 2065.1 – Chionodes cacula
- 2065.2 – Chionodes impes
- 2066 – Chionodes canofusella
- 2066.1 – Chionodes aruns
- 2066.2 – Chionodes chlorocephala
- 2067 – Chionodes ceanothiella
- 2067.1 – Chionodes ceryx
- 2067.2 – Chionodes kubai
- 2068 – Chionodes chrysopyla
- 2069 – Chionodes continuella, spring oak leafroller moth
- 2069.1 – Chionodes sattleri
- 2069.2 – Chionodes offectus
- 2069.3 – Chionodes fictor
- 2070 – Chionodes dammersi
- 2071 – Chionodes dentella
- 2071.1 – Chionodes landryi
- 2071.2 – Chionodes thyotes
- 2072 – Chionodes discoocellella, eyeringed chionodes moth
- 2072.1 – Chionodes donatella
- 2072.2 – Chionodes drapeta
- 2072.3 – Chionodes emptor
- 2072.4 – Chionodes esor
- 2073 – Chionodes figurella
- 2074 – Chionodes flavicorporella
- 2075 – Chionodes praeclarella
- 2076 – Chionodes fondella
- 2077 – Chionodes formosella, spring oak leafroller moth
- 2077.1 – Chionodes franclemonti
- 2078 – Chionodes fructuaria
- 2078.1 – Chionodes cibus
- 2078.2 – Chionodes bardus
- 2079 – Chionodes fuscomaculella
- 2080 – Chionodes gilvomaculella
- 2080.1 – Chionodes abavus
- 2080.2 – Chionodes tarmes
- 2081 – Chionodes grandis
- 2081.1 – Chionodes factor
- 2081.2 – Chionodes hospes
- 2081.3 – Chionodes pallor
- 2081.4 – Chionodes dolo
- 2081.5 – Chionodes rectifex
- 2082 – Chionodes halycopa
- 2083 – Chionodes helicosticta
- 2084 – Chionodes hibiscella
- 2084.1 – Chionodes imber
- 2084.2 – Chionodes bios
- 2085 – Chionodes iridescens
- 2086 – Chionodes kincaidella
- 2086.1 – Chionodes macor
- 2086.2 – Chionodes oecus
- no number yet – Chionodes hodgesorum
- 2086.3 – Chionodes repertor
- 2087.1 – Chionodes latro
- 2089 – Chionodes lophosella
- 2090 – Chionodes lugubrella
- 2090.1 – Chionodes obelus
- 2091 – Chionodes luteogeminatus
- 2092 – Chionodes mariona
- 2092.1 – Chionodes petro
- 2093 – Chionodes mediofuscella, black-smudged chionodes moth
- 2094 – Chionodes metallica
- 2094.1 – Chionodes sepultor
- 2094.2 – Chionodes canor
- 2094.3 – Chionodes histon
- 2094.4 – Chionodes lictor
- 2094.5 – Chionodes praecia
- 2095 – Chionodes nanodella
- 2095.1 – Chionodes donahueorum
- 2095.2 – Chionodes pulvis
- 2095.3 – Chionodes sannio
- 2095.4 – Chionodes stator
- 2095.5 – Chionodes meddix
- 2095.6 – Chionodes lactans
- 2095.7 – Chionodes volo
- 2095.8 – Chionodes obex
- 2095.9 – Chionodes munifex
- 2097 – Chionodes nigrobarbata
- 2097.1 – Chionodes praetor
- 2097.2 – Chionodes naevus
- 2097.3 – Chionodes davisi
- 2098 – Chionodes notandella
- 2098.1 – Chionodes morus
- 2099 – Chionodes obscurusella, boxelder leafworm moth
- 2100 – Chionodes occidentella
- 2100.1 – Chionodes fremor
- 2100.2 – Chionodes soter
- 2100.3 – Chionodes lusor
- 2101 – Chionodes occlusa
- 2101.1 – Chionodes boreas
- 2101.2 – Chionodes trico
- 2101.3 – Chionodes veles
- 2101.4 – Chionodes theurgis
- 2101.5 – Chionodes gerdius
- 2101.6 – Chionodes tributor
- 2102 – Chionodes ochreostrigella
- 2102.1 – Chionodes rhombus
- 2103 – Chionodes paralogella
- 2104 – Chionodes pereyra
- 2105 – Chionodes periculella
- 2105.1 – Chionodes pavor
- 2105.2 – Chionodes johnstoni
- 2105.3 – Chionodes pacator
- 2106 – Chionodes permacta
- 2106.1 – Chionodes clarkei
- 2107 – Chionodes petalumensis
- 2108 – Chionodes phalacra
- 2108.1 – Chionodes popa
- 2109 – Chionodes pinguicula
- 2109.1 – Chionodes powelli
- 2109.2 – Chionodes plutor
- 2109.3 – Chionodes nepos
- 2109.4 – Chionodes procus
- 2109.5 – Chionodes paean
- 2110 – Chionodes pseudofondella
- 2110.1 – Chionodes bibo
- 2111 – Chionodes psiloptera
- 2111.1 – Chionodes rabula
- 2111.2 – Chionodes aleo
- 2112 – Chionodes retiniella
- 2112.1 – Chionodes elainae
- 2112.2 – Chionodes luror
- 2113 – Chionodes sabinianae
- 2114 – Chionodes salicella
- 2114.1 – Chionodes lector
- 2114.2 – Chionodes hostis
- 2115.1 – Chionodes sevir
- 2116 – Chionodes sistrella
- 2117 – Chionodes terminimaculella
- 2117.1 – Chionodes erro
- 2118 – Chionodes tessa
- 2118.1 – Chionodes rector
- 2118.2 – Chionodes delitor
- 2118.3 – Chionodes nitor
- 2118.4 – Chionodes sanator
- 2118.5 – Chionodes regens
- 2119 – Chionodes thoraceochrella
- 2120 – Chionodes trichostola
- 2120.1 – Chionodes parens
- 2120.2 – Chionodes restio
- 2120.3 – Chionodes pinax
- 2120.4 – Chionodes adamas
- 2121 – Chionodes trophella
- 2121.1 – Chionodes ludio
- 2121.2 – Chionodes messor
- 2121.3 – Chionodes optio
- 2121.4 – Chionodes pastor
- 2121.5 – Chionodes nubis
- 2121.6 – Chionodes magirus
- 2121.7 – Chionodes innox
- 2121.8 – Chionodes gestor
- 2123 – Chionodes viduella
- 2123.1 – Chionodes ensis
- 2124 – Chionodes whitmanella
- 2124.1 – Chionodes senica
- 2124.2 – Chionodes dator
- 2124.3 – Chionodes sponsus
- 2124.4 – Chionodes ustor
- 2124.5 – Chionodes rogator
- 2124.6 – Chionodes mikkolai
- 2124.7 – Chionodes praeco
- 2124.8 – Chionodes molitor
- 2125 – Chionodes xanthophilella
- 2126 – Neofaculta infernella
- 2127 – Filatima abactella
- 2127.1 – Filatima adamsi
- 2128 – Filatima albicostella
- 2129 – Filatima albilorella
- 2130 – Filatima albipectis
- 2131 – Filatima arizonella
- 2132 – Filatima aulaea
- 2133 – Filatima betulae
- 2134 – Filatima biforella
- 2135 – Filatima bigella
- 2136 – Filatima biminimaculella
- 2137 – Filatima catacrossa
- 2138 – Filatima collinearis
- 2139 – Filatima confusatella
- 2140 – Filatima cushmani
- 2141 – Filatima dimissae
- 2142 – Filatima depuratella
- 2143 – Filatima epulatrix
- 2144 – Filatima frugalis
- 2145 – Filatima fuliginea
- 2146 – Filatima glycyrhizaeella
- 2147 – Filatima golovina
- 2148 – Filatima gomphopis
- 2149 – Filatima hemicrossa
- 2150 – Filatima inquilinella
- 2151 – Filatima isocrossa
- 2152 – Filatima monotaeniella
- 2153 – Filatima natalis
- 2154 – Filatima neotrophella
- 2155 – Filatima nigripectus
- 2156 – Filatima normifera
- 2157 – Filatima nucifer
- 2158 – Filatima obidenna
- 2159 – Filatima obscuroocellella
- 2160 – Filatima obscurosuffusella
- 2160.1 – Filatima occidua
- 2161 – Filatima ochreosuffusella
- 2162 – Filatima ornatifimbriella
- 2163 – Filatima perpensa
- 2164 – Filatima persicaeella
- 2165 – Filatima platyochra
- 2166 – Filatima pravinominella
- 2167 – Filatima procedes
- 2168 – Filatima prognosticata
- 2169 – Filatima pseudacaciella, dusky-backed filatima moth
- 2170 – Filatima roceliella
- 2171 – Filatima saliciphaga
- 2172 – Filatima serotinella
- 2173 – Filatima shastaella
- 2174 – Filatima sperryi
- 2175 – Filatima spinigera
- 2176 – Filatima striatella
- 2177 – Filatima tephrinopa
- 2178 – Filatima tridentata
- 2179 – Filatima vaccinii
- 2180 – Filatima vaniae
- 2181 – Filatima xanthuris
- no number yet – Filatima loowita
- no number yet – Filatima revisensis
- 2182 – Aroga acharnaea
- 2183 – Aroga alleriella
- 2184 – Aroga argutiola
- 2185 – Aroga camptogramma
- 2186 – Aroga chlorocrana
- 2187 – Aroga compositella, six-spotted aroga moth
- 2188 – Aroga eldorada
- 2189 – Aroga epigaeella
- 2190 – Aroga eriogonella
- 2191 – Aroga leucanieella
- 2192 – Aroga morenella
- 2193 – Aroga paraplutella
- 2194 – Aroga paulella
- 2195 – Aroga rigidae
- 2196 – Aroga thoracealbella
- 2197 – Aroga trachycosma
- 2198 – Aroga trialbamaculella, red-striped fireworm moth
- 2199 – Aroga trilineella
- 2200 – Aroga unifasciella
- 2201 – Aroga websteri
- 2202 – Aroga xyloglypta
- 2203 – Fascista bimaculella
- 2204 – Fascista cercerisella, redbud leaffolder moth
- 2205 – Fascista quinella
- 2206 – Faculta inaequalis
- 2207 – Faculta triangulella
- 2208 – Mirificarma eburnella
- 2209 – Stegasta bosqueella, red-necked peanutworm moth
- 2210 – Polyhymno acaciella
- 2211 – Polyhymno luteostrigella, polyhymno moth
- 2212 – Calliprora sexstrigella
- 2213 – Sophronia primella
- 2214 – Sophronia roseicrinella
- 2215 – Sophronia teretracma
- 2216 – Ymeldia janae, Jane's ymeldia moth
- 2217 – Aproaerema anthyllidella
- 2218 – Syncopacma adversa
- 2219 – Syncopacma crotalariella
- 2220 – Syncopacma metadesma
- 2221 – Syncopacma nigrella
- 2222 – Syncopacma palpilineella
- 2223 – Untomia albistrigella
- 2224 – Untomia untomiella
- 2225 – Battaristis concinusella
- 2226 – Battaristis cyclella
- 2227 – Battaristis nigratomella
- 2228 – Battaristis pasadenae
- 2229 – Battaristis vittella, stripe-backed moth
- 2230 – Anacampsis agrimoniella
- 2231 – Anacampsis argyrothamniella
- 2232 – Anacampsis comparanda
- 2233 – Anacampsis conclusella
- 2234 – Anacampsis coverdalella, Coverdale's anacampsis moth
- 2235 – Anacampsis fragariella
- 2236 – Anacampsis fullonella
- 2237 – Anacampsis innocuella, dark-headed aspen leafroller moth
- 2238 – Anacampsis kearfottella
- 2239 – Anacampsis lacteusochrella
- 2240 – Anacampsis lagunculariella
- 2241 – Anacampsis levipedella
- 2242 – Anacampsis lupinella
- 2243 – Anacampsis niveopulvella, pale-headed aspen leafroller moth
- 2244 – Anacampsis nonstrigella
- 2245 – Anacampsis paltodoriella
- 2246 – Anacampsis populella, sallow leafroller moth
- 2247 – Anacampsis psoraliella
- 2248 – Anacampsis rhoifructella
- no number yet – Anacampsis consonella
- 2249 – Anacampsis sacramenta
- 2250 – Anacampsis tephriasella
- 2251 – Anacampsis tristrigella
- 2252 – Compsolechia crescentifasciella
- 2253 – Strobisia iridipennella, iridescent strobisia moth
- 2254 – Strobisia proserpinella
- 2255 – Holophysis emblemella
- 2256 – Prostomeus brunneus, guava caterpillar moth
- 2257 – Anarsia lineatella, peach twig borer moth
- 2258 – Hypatima zesticopa
- 2259 – Epilechia catalinella
- 2260 – Sitotroga cerealella, angoumois grain moth
- 2261 – Pectinophora gossypiella, pink bollworm moth
- 2262 – Platyedra subcinerea, cotton stem moth
- 2263 – Helcystogramma badia
- 2264 – Helcystogramma casca
- 2265 – Helcystogramma chambersella
- 2265.1 – Helcystogramma convolvuli, sweetpotato webworm moth
- 2266 – Gelechia discoannulella
- 2267 – Helcystogramma fernaldella, Fernald's helcystogramma moth
- 2268 – Helcystogramma hystricella, lanceolate helcystogramma moth
- 2269 – Helcystogramma melanocarpa
- 2270 – Helcystogramma melantherella
- 2271.1 – Helcystogramma ectopon
- 2272 – Brachyacma palpigera, soybean webworm moth
- 2274 – Dichomeris bipunctella
- 2275 – Dichomeris condaliavorella
- 2275.1 – Dichomeris blanchardorum
- 2276 – Scodes deflecta
- 2277 – Dichomeris georgiella
- 2278 – Dichomeris glenni
- 2279 – Dichomeris hirculella
- 2279.1 – Dichomeris caia
- 2279.2 – Dichomeris ardelia
- 2279.3 – Dichomeris siren, least dichomeris moth
- 2280 – Dichomeris hypochloa
- 2281 – Dichomeris ligulella, palmerworm moth
- 2281.1 – Dichomeris gausapa
- 2282 – Dichomeris marginella, juniper webworm moth
- 2282.1 – Dichomeris solatrix
- 2283 – Dichomeris punctidiscella, spotted dichomeris moth
- 2284 – Dichomeris acuminata
- 2284.1 – Dichomeris nenia
- 2285.1 – Dichomeris diva
- 2285.2 – Dichomeris sylphe
- 2285.3 – Dichomeris empusa
- 2286 – Dichomeris vacciniella
- 2287 – Dichomeris ventrella
- 2288 – Dichomeris punctipennella, many-spotted dichomeris moth
- 2289 – Dichomeris ochripalpella, shining dichomeris moth
- 2289.1 – Dichomeris achne
- 2290 – Dichomeris barnesiella
- 2291 – Dichomeris bilobella, bilobed dichomeris moth
- 2291.1 – Dichomeris aleatrix, buffy dichomeris moth
- 2291.2 – Dichomeris copa, copa dichomeris moth
- 2291.3 – Dichomeris scrutaria
- 2291.4 – Dichomeris furia
- 2292 – Dichomeris citrifoliella, orange webworm moth
- 2293 – Dichomeris costarufoella
- 2294 – Dichomeris delotella
- 2294.1 – Dichomeris gleba
- 2294.2 – Dichomeris alphito
- 2294.3 – Dichomeris laetitia
- 2295 – Dichomeris flavocostella, cream-edged dichomeris moth
- 2295.1 – Dichomeris fistuca
- 2296 – Gelechia griseella
- 2297 – Dichomeris inserrata, indented dichomeris moth
- 2297.1 – Dichomeris pelta
- 2297.2 – Dichomeris bolize, Glaser's dichomeris moth
- 2297.3 – Dichomeris legnotoa
- 2297.4 – Dichomeris illusio
- 2297.5 – Dichomeris mimesis
- 2298 – Dichomeris juncidella
- 2299 – Dichomeris leuconotella
- 2299.1 – Dichomeris mercatrix
- 2299.2 – Dichomeris euprepes
- 2300 – Dichomeris levisella
- 2301 – Dichomeris serrativittella
- 2301.1 – Dichomeris xanthoa
- 2301.2 – Dichomeris isa
- 2301.3 – Dichomeris simulata
- 2301.4 – Dichomeris imitata
- 2302 – Dichomeris setosella
- 2302.1 – Dichomeris vindex
- 2302.2 – Dichomeris mulsa
- 2302.3 – Dichomeris mica
- 2302.4 – Dichomeris aglaia
- 2303 – Dichomeris simpliciella
- 2303.1 – Dichomeris baxa
- 2303.2 – Dichomeris gnoma
- 2304 – Dichomeris stipendiaria
- 2305 – Dichomeris agonia
- 2305.1 – Dichomeris offula
- 2305.2 – Dichomeris crepida
- 2306 – Dichomeris washingtoniella
- 2307 – Dichomeris nonstrigella
- 2308 – Dichomeris purpureofusca
- 2309 – Dichomeris picrocarpa, black-edged carbatina moth
- 2309.1 – Dichomeris sybilla
- 2310 – Dichomeris inversella
- 2310.1 – Dichomeris kimballi
- 2311 – Deoclona yuccasella

== See also ==
- List of butterflies of North America
- List of Lepidoptera of Hawaii
- List of moths of Canada
- List of butterflies of Canada
