= Dichomeris crepida =

Scientific classification
- Kingdom: Animalia
- Phylum: Arthropoda
- Clade: Pancrustacea
- Class: Insecta
- Order: Lepidoptera
- Family: Gelechiidae
- Genus: Dichomeris
- Species: D. crepida

Binomial name
- Dichomeris crepida Hodges, 1986

Species of moth

Dichomeris crepida is a moth in the family Gelechiidae. It was described by Ronald W. Hodges in 1986. It is found in North America, where it has been recorded from Alabama, South Carolina, Florida, Mississippi and Louisiana.
