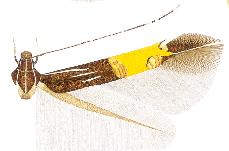

Scientific classification
- Kingdom: Animalia
- Phylum: Arthropoda
- Clade: Pancrustacea
- Class: Insecta
- Order: Lepidoptera
- Family: Cosmopterigidae
- Genus: Cosmopterix
- Species: C. inopis

Binomial name
- Cosmopterix inopis Hodges, 1962

Synonyms
- Cosmopterix gracilens Hodges, 1962

= Cosmopterix inopis =

Species of moth

Cosmopterix inopis is a moth of the family Cosmopterigidae. It is known in the United States, from Arizona and Florida.

Adults have been recorded in April and September. There are probably two generations per year.

== Description ==
Male, female. Forewing length 4.5 millimetres (0.18 in). Head: frons shining pale ochreous with greenish and reddish reflections, vertex and neck tufts shining dark brown with greenish and reddish gloss, laterally (very narrowly) and medially lined white, collar shining dark brown; labial palpus first segment very short, shining ochreous, second segment about three-quarters of the length of third, dark brown, laterally and ventrally lined white, third segment white, lined dark brown laterally; scape dorsally shining dark brown with a white anterior line, shining white ventrally, antenna shining dark brown, a white line from base to beyond one-half, often partly interrupted in distal half, followed towards apex by an annulate section of three segments, eleven dark brown, four white, two dark brown, two white, ten dark brown and eight white segments at apex. Thorax and tegulae shining dark brown with greenish and reddish gloss, thorax with a white median line, tegulae lined white inwardly. Legs: shining dark brown with reddish gloss, femur of foreleg shining grey, femora of midleg and hindleg shining goldish brown, foreleg with a white longitudinal line on tibia and tarsal segments one, two and basal half of segment three and segment five, tibia of midleg with white oblique basal and medial lines and a white apical ring, tarsal segment one with a white line on the outside and a white apical ring, segment two with a white apical ring, segment five dorsally white, tibia of hindleg as midleg, tarsal segment one with a white basal ring and a white dorsal line from one third, segments two to five dorsally white, spurs white dorsally, dark greyish brown ventrally. Forewing shining dark brown with reddish gloss, four white lines in the basal area, a subcostal from base to one-quarter, strongly bending from costa in apical third, a short medial, ending slightly beyond the subcostal, a subdorsal, a little shorter than the medial, and ending just beyond it, a narrow dorsal from beyond base to one-quarter, a broad dark yellow transverse fascia beyond the middle, narrowing towards dorsum and with a short apical protrusion, bordered at the inner edge by a broad tubercular golden metallic fascia, slightly widening towards dorsum, outwardly edged by two tubercular golden metallic costal and dorsal spots, the dorsal spot about five times as large as the costal and much closer to base, both fascia and spots with reddish and purplish reflections, both spots narrowly edged blackish brown on the inside, a broad white costal streak from the costal spot, a narrow white apical line from the apical protrusion, slightly widening in the cilia at apex; cilia dark brown around apex, paler on dorsum towards base. Hindwing shining pale brownish grey, cilia pale brown. Underside: forewing shining greyish brown with distinct white costal streak and apical spot, hindwing shining grey.
