= Ethmia angustalatella =

Scientific classification
- Kingdom: Animalia
- Phylum: Arthropoda
- Clade: Pancrustacea
- Class: Insecta
- Order: Lepidoptera
- Family: Depressariidae
- Genus: Ethmia
- Species: E. angustalatella

Binomial name
- Ethmia angustalatella Powell, 1973

Species of moth

Ethmia angustalatella is a moth in the family Depressariidae. It is found in north-eastern Mexico and Texas.

The length of the forewings is about 11.2 mm (0.44 in). The ground color of the forewings is brownish gray, interspersed with white, which tends to form markings. The ground color of the hindwings is whitish basally, becoming pale brownish in the distal half. Adults are on wing in September (in Texas).
