= Ethmia hodgesella =

Scientific classification
- Kingdom: Animalia
- Phylum: Arthropoda
- Clade: Pancrustacea
- Class: Insecta
- Order: Lepidoptera
- Family: Depressariidae
- Genus: Ethmia
- Species: E. hodgesella

Binomial name
- Ethmia hodgesella Powell, 1973

Species of moth

Ethmia hodgesella is a moth in the family Depressariidae. It is found in the United States in Texas, Arizona, and California, extending along the two sides of the central cordillera of Mexico.

The length of the forewings is 6–7.8 mm (0.24–0.31 in). The pattern of the forewings is divided by a serpentine longitudinal line. The dorsal area is whitish, invaded by three prominent triangulate dark spurs from the cell with a conspicuous round, dark spot between and below the first two spurs. The area costad of the line is mostly dark brownish gray. The ground color of the hindwings is unicolorous pale gray.
