= Ethmia caliginosella =

Scientific classification
- Kingdom: Animalia
- Phylum: Arthropoda
- Class: Insecta
- Order: Lepidoptera
- Family: Depressariidae
- Genus: Ethmia
- Species: E. caliginosella

Binomial name
- Ethmia caliginosella Busck, 1904

Species of moth

Ethmia caliginosella is a moth in the family Depressariidae. It is found in the United States in high montane Colorado.

The length of the forewings is 11.7–12 mm (0.46–0.47 in). The ground color of the forewings is dark slate gray with black markings. The ground color of the hindwings is pale gray, but the hairs of the anal area are darker. Adults are on wing from late June to late July.

The larvae have been recorded on Pseudocymopterus multifidus, but this is an unlikely host.
