= Scythris piratica =

Scientific classification
- Kingdom: Animalia
- Phylum: Arthropoda
- Clade: Pancrustacea
- Class: Insecta
- Order: Lepidoptera
- Family: Scythrididae
- Genus: Scythris
- Species: S. piratica

Binomial name
- Scythris piratica Meyrick, 1928

Species of moth

Scythris piratica is a moth of the family Scythrididae. It was described by Edward Meyrick in 1928. The species has been recorded in the United States, including New Mexico and Texas.

== Description ==
Adults have a wingspan of approximately 12 mm. The forewings are pale grey in males and rosy-grey-whitish in females. They feature broad dark-grey bands, with their hindwings being grey. Females also have an irregular streak of black scales along the outer margin of the hind wings.

== Taxonomy ==
The species was described by Edward Meyrick in June 1928 in Exotic Microlepidoptera, volume 3, issue 13, page 414. It is assigned MONA number 1671 in the North American moth numbering system.
