= Antaeotricha furcata =

Scientific classification
- Domain: Eukaryota
- Kingdom: Animalia
- Phylum: Arthropoda
- Class: Insecta
- Order: Lepidoptera
- Family: Depressariidae
- Genus: Antaeotricha
- Species: A. furcata

Binomial name
- Antaeotricha furcata (Walsingham, 1889)

Synonyms
- Stenoma furcata Walsingham, 1889

Species of moth

Antaeotricha furcata is a moth in the family Depressariidae. It was described by Lord Walsingham in 1889. It is found in North America, where it has been recorded from Arizona and New Mexico.

The wingspan is about 27 mm for males and 30 mm for females. The forewings are white, with a slight tinge of brownish-grey, commencing near the base of the dorsal margin and extending to the anal angle below the discal cell, and very faintly in a narrow line along the base of the cilia in the apical margin. In the females there is a faint indication of pale, greyish clouds and spots at the end of the cell, and of a pale greyish transverse line between this and the apical margin on the lower half of the wing, and in the abdominal angle are some raised scales. There are also a few divided black scales in the middle of the cilia. The hindwings are dark cinereous in males and pale greyish-ochreous in females.
