= Dichomeris caia =

Scientific classification
- Kingdom: Animalia
- Phylum: Arthropoda
- Clade: Pancrustacea
- Class: Insecta
- Order: Lepidoptera
- Family: Gelechiidae
- Genus: Dichomeris
- Species: D. caia

Binomial name
- Dichomeris caia Hodges, 1986

Species of moth

Dichomeris caia is a moth in the family Gelechiidae. It was described by Ronald W. Hodges in 1986. It is found in North America, where it has been recorded from Nova Scotia and southern Ontario to Illinois, Ohio and South Carolina.
