= Ethmia lassenella =

Scientific classification
- Domain: Eukaryota
- Kingdom: Animalia
- Phylum: Arthropoda
- Class: Insecta
- Order: Lepidoptera
- Family: Depressariidae
- Genus: Ethmia
- Species: E. lassenella

Binomial name
- Ethmia lassenella Busck, 1908

Species of moth

Ethmia lassenella is a moth in the family Depressariidae. It is found in the United States in California, Arizona, Nevada and Utah.

The length of the forewings is 7.8–8.3 mm (0.31–0.33 in). The ground color of the forewings is steel gray including the fringe. There are two bright red-orange spots and five smaller black spots. The ground color of the hindwings is white with a broad black, moderately well defined marginal band. Adults are on wing from mid-March to mid-April.
