= Elachista fuliginea =

Scientific classification
- Domain: Eukaryota
- Kingdom: Animalia
- Phylum: Arthropoda
- Class: Insecta
- Order: Lepidoptera
- Family: Elachistidae
- Genus: Elachista
- Species: E. fuliginea

Binomial name
- Elachista fuliginea Braun, 1948

Species of moth

Elachista fuliginea is a moth of the family Elachistidae. It is found in North America, where it has been recorded from Massachusetts and southern Ontario.

The wingspan is 9–10 mm for males and about 10 mm for females. Adults have been recorded on wing in July.
