= Dichomeris siren =

Least dichomeris moth

Scientific classification
- Kingdom: Animalia
- Phylum: Arthropoda
- Clade: Pancrustacea
- Class: Insecta
- Order: Lepidoptera
- Family: Gelechiidae
- Genus: Dichomeris
- Species: D. siren

Binomial name
- Dichomeris siren Hodges, 1986

Species of moth

Dichomeris siren, the least dichomeris moth, is a moth in the family Gelechiidae. It was described by Ronald W. Hodges in 1986. It is found in the United States, where it has been recorded from Maryland, Connecticut, Indiana, Michigan, New Jersey, Virginia, South Carolina, Tennessee and Georgia.

The length of the forewings is 3.1–3.8 mm. Adults are on wing from May to October.
