= Dichomeris nenia =

Scientific classification
- Kingdom: Animalia
- Phylum: Arthropoda
- Clade: Pancrustacea
- Class: Insecta
- Order: Lepidoptera
- Family: Gelechiidae
- Genus: Dichomeris
- Species: D. nenia

Binomial name
- Dichomeris nenia Hodges, 1986

Species of moth

Dichomeris nenia is a moth in the family Gelechiidae. It was described by Ronald W. Hodges in 1986. It is found in North America, where it has been recorded from Texas, Arkansas, Alabama, Mississippi and Florida.

Adults have been recorded on wing from March to May, in July, from September to October and in December.

The larvae feed on Indigofera lindheimeri.
