= Coleophora manitoba =

Scientific classification
- Kingdom: Animalia
- Phylum: Arthropoda
- Class: Insecta
- Order: Lepidoptera
- Family: Coleophoridae
- Genus: Coleophora
- Species: C. manitoba

Binomial name
- Coleophora manitoba Busck, 1915

Species of moth

Coleophora manitoba is a moth of the family Coleophoridae. It is found in Canada, including Manitoba.
