= Dichomeris offula =

Scientific classification
- Kingdom: Animalia
- Phylum: Arthropoda
- Clade: Pancrustacea
- Class: Insecta
- Order: Lepidoptera
- Family: Gelechiidae
- Genus: Dichomeris
- Species: D. offula

Binomial name
- Dichomeris offula Hodges, 1986

Species of moth

Dichomeris offula is a moth in the family Gelechiidae. It was described by Ronald W. Hodges in 1986. It is found in North America, where it has been recorded from New York, Kentucky, Alabama, Mississippi, Louisiana, Michigan, Maine, West Virginia, British Columbia, Manitoba and Ontario.
