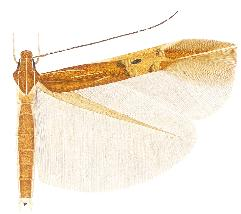

Scientific classification
- Kingdom: Animalia
- Phylum: Arthropoda
- Class: Insecta
- Order: Lepidoptera
- Family: Cosmopterigidae
- Genus: Cosmopterix
- Species: C. fernaldella

Binomial name
- Cosmopterix fernaldella Walsingham, 1882

= Cosmopterix fernaldella =

Species of moth

Cosmopterix fernaldella is a moth of the family Cosmopterigidae. It is known from the United States (from Maine and the Lower Peninsula of Michigan south to New Jersey and Pennsylvania, Wisconsin and Minnesota) and Canada (Quebec, Ontario and British Columbia).

== Description ==
Male, female. Forewing length 4.8–5.0 mm. Head: frons shining pale ochreous with greenish and reddish reflections, vertex and neck tufts shining golden brown, medially and laterally lined white, collar golden brown; labial palpus first segment very short, white, second segment three-quarters of the length of third, greyish brown with white longitudinal lines laterally and ventrally, third segment white, lined dark brown laterally; scape brown with a white anterior line, white ventrally, antenna shining dark brown, a short white line from base to one-fifth, at two-thirds two white rings consisting of one segment each, divided by three dark brown segments, followed towards apex by ten dark brown, one white and six dark brown segments at apex. Thorax and tegulae golden brown, thorax with a white median line, tegulae lined white inwardly. Legs: ochreous-grey, femur of hindleg shining ochreous-white with purplish reflection, foreleg with a white line on tibia and tarsal segments one to three and five, tibia of midleg with an oblique basal white line, a white medial spot and a white apical ring, tarsal segments one and two with white dorsal spot at apex, segment five entirely white, tibia of hindleg with oblique basal and medial white lines and a white apical ring, tarsal segments dorsally white, spurs brownish grey on the outside, white on the inside. Forewing golden brown, five rather indistinct ochreous-white lines in the basal area, a broad costal from one-quarter to the inward costal protrusion of the transverse fascia, a subcostal from base to one-quarter, bending gradually from costa in distal half, an almost straight medial above fold, from one-fifth to one-third, a short and somewhat oblique subdorsal ending just beyond the medial, a dorsal from beyond base to one-quarter, a greyish ochreous transverse fascia beyond the middle, narrowed towards dorsum and with a narrow apical protrusion, bordered at the inner edge by two greenish golden metallic tubercular subcostal and dorsal spots, the subcostal spot twice as large as the dorsal and outwardly edged by a patch of blackish brown scales, the dorsal spot slightly further from base, bordered at the outer edge by two similarly coloured costal and dorsal spots, the dorsal spot about twice as large as the costal and more towards base, both spots edged dark brown on the inside, a yellowish white costal streak from the outer costal spot and a narrow whitish apical line from the apical protrusion, cilia ochreous-brown, ochreous-grey towards dorsum. Hindwing shining grey, cilia ochreous-grey. Underside: forewing shining greyish brown, the whitish apical line indistinctly visible in the cilia, hindwing shining greyish brown. Abdomen dorsally shining pale golden brown, laterally shining grey, ventrally shining yellowish white, anal tuft yellowish white.

== Biology ==
The larvae feed on Carex species. They mine the leaves of their host plant.
