= Ethmia macneilli =

Scientific classification
- Kingdom: Animalia
- Phylum: Arthropoda
- Clade: Pancrustacea
- Class: Insecta
- Order: Lepidoptera
- Family: Depressariidae
- Genus: Ethmia
- Species: E. macneilli

Binomial name
- Ethmia macneilli Powell, 1973

Species of moth

Ethmia macneilli is a moth in the family Depressariidae. It is found in the United States in California and Arizona.

The length of the forewings is 10.7–11.1 mm (0.42–0.44 in). The ground color of the forewings is white with scattered dark scales tending to form lines between the veins in the distal half. The ground color of the hindwings is white, becoming pale brownish toward the margins.
