= Coleophora dissociella =

Scientific classification
- Kingdom: Animalia
- Phylum: Arthropoda
- Class: Insecta
- Order: Lepidoptera
- Family: Coleophoridae
- Genus: Coleophora
- Species: C. dissociella

Binomial name
- Coleophora dissociella McDunnough, 1955

Species of moth

Coleophora dissociella is a moth of the family Coleophoridae. It is found in Canada, including Nova Scotia.
