= Aristotelia isopelta =

Scientific classification
- Kingdom: Animalia
- Phylum: Arthropoda
- Clade: Pancrustacea
- Class: Insecta
- Order: Lepidoptera
- Family: Gelechiidae
- Genus: Aristotelia
- Species: A. isopelta

Binomial name
- Aristotelia isopelta Meyrick, 1929

Synonyms
- Aristotelia nigrobasiella Clarke, 1932

Species of moth

Aristotelia isopelta is a moth of the family Gelechiidae. It was described by Edward Meyrick in 1929. It is found in North America, where it has been recorded from Arizona, British Columbia, California, Indiana, Maine, Massachusetts, Quebec and Texas.

The wingspan is 9–12 mm.
