= Dichomeris mulsa =

Scientific classification
- Kingdom: Animalia
- Phylum: Arthropoda
- Clade: Pancrustacea
- Class: Insecta
- Order: Lepidoptera
- Family: Gelechiidae
- Genus: Dichomeris
- Species: D. mulsa

Binomial name
- Dichomeris mulsa Hodges, 1986

Species of moth

Dichomeris mulsa is a moth in the family Gelechiidae. It was described by Ronald W. Hodges in 1986. It is found in North America, where it has been recorded from Arizona. It is also found in Mexico.

The length of the forewings is about 8 mm.
