= Coleophora rosaevorella =

Scientific classification
- Kingdom: Animalia
- Phylum: Arthropoda
- Class: Insecta
- Order: Lepidoptera
- Family: Coleophoridae
- Genus: Coleophora
- Species: C. rosaevorella

Binomial name
- Coleophora rosaevorella McDunnough, 1946

Species of moth

Coleophora rosaevorella is a moth of the family Coleophoridae. It is found in Canada, including Ontario and New Brunswick.

The larvae feed on the buds of Rosa species. They create a tubular leaf case.
