= Dichomeris mercatrix =

Scientific classification
- Kingdom: Animalia
- Phylum: Arthropoda
- Clade: Pancrustacea
- Class: Insecta
- Order: Lepidoptera
- Family: Gelechiidae
- Genus: Dichomeris
- Species: D. mercatrix

Binomial name
- Dichomeris mercatrix Hodges, 1986

Species of moth

Dichomeris mercatrix is a moth in the family Gelechiidae. It was described by Ronald W. Hodges in 1986. It is found in North America, where it has been recorded from Nova Scotia, New York and Indiana.
