= Dichomeris kimballi =

Scientific classification
- Kingdom: Animalia
- Phylum: Arthropoda
- Clade: Pancrustacea
- Class: Insecta
- Order: Lepidoptera
- Family: Gelechiidae
- Genus: Dichomeris
- Species: D. kimballi

Binomial name
- Dichomeris kimballi Hodges, 1986

Species of moth

Dichomeris kimballi is a moth in the family Gelechiidae. It was described by Ronald W. Hodges in 1986. It is found in North America, where it has been recorded from southern Ontario east to New Jersey, south to Florida, west to Texas, Oklahoma and Illinois.
