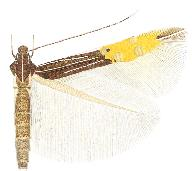

Scientific classification
- Kingdom: Animalia
- Phylum: Arthropoda
- Clade: Pancrustacea
- Class: Insecta
- Order: Lepidoptera
- Family: Cosmopterigidae
- Genus: Cosmopterix
- Species: C. chisosensis

Binomial name
- Cosmopterix chisosensis Hodges, 1978

= Cosmopterix chisosensis =

Species of moth

Cosmopterix chisosensis is a moth of the family Cosmopterigidae. It is known from Argentina (Salta, Tucumán) and the United States (Texas, Arizona, Mississippi).

Adults were collected in May and June in the United States and from November to February in Argentina.

== Description ==
Male, female. Forewing length 2.9-4.9 mm. Head: frons shining yellowish white, vertex light brown, neck tufts brown, medially and laterally lined white, collar brown; labial palpus first segment very short, white, second segment two-thirds of the length of third, dark brown with white longitudinal lines laterally and ventrally, third segment white, lined dark brown laterally; scape dorsally dark brown with white anterior and dorsal lines, ventrally shining white, antenna shining dark brown with a white line from base to two-thirds, interrupted from one-third, followed towards apex by three white segments, one partially brown, two white, five brown and four white segments at apex. Thorax and tegulae brown, thorax with a white median line. Legs: femora shining greyish brown, tibia and tarsi shining brown, foreleg with a white line on tibia and tarsal segments, fifth segment entirely white, tibia of midleg with white oblique basal and medial lines and a white apical ring, tarsal segments one, two and four with white apical rings, segment five entirely white, tibia of hindleg as midleg, tarsal segment one with white basal and apical rings, other segments ochreous with indistinct white apical rings, spurs white with a longitudinal brown streak. Forewing dark brown, five narrow white lines in the basal area, a costal from one-quarter to the transverse fascia, a subcostal from base to two-fifths, bending from costa beyond half, a medial from base to the transverse fascia, a subdorsal from one-fifth to the transverse fascia, bending from dorsum distally, a dorsal from one-sixth to or nearly to the transverse fascia, a broad pale yellow transverse fascia beyond the middle almost to apex, inwardly with a small basal protrusion, bordered at the inner edge by two silver to pale golden metallic, tubercular subcostal and subdorsal spots, the subcostal spot with a patch of blackish scales on the outside, the subdorsal spot beyond inner edge of transverse fascia and further from base than the subcostal, inwardly edged dark brown, at two-thirds of the transverse fascia similarly coloured costal and subdorsal spot, both spots opposite, the costal spot smaller than the subdorsal and inwardly edged brown, a white costal streak connected to the outer costal spot followed by a broad pale yellow streak into costal cilia, a broad shining white apical line, cilia pale brown around apex, pale yellow mixed pale brown towards dorsum. Hindwing shining brownish grey, cilia pale brown. Underside: forewing shining greyish brown, apical half of forewing lighter and apical line visible, cilia pale yellow at costa; hindwing shining greyish brown at costa, pale grey at dorsum. Abdomen dorsally pale greyish brown with greenish and reddish gloss, ventrally shining white, anal tuft dorsally greyish white, ventrally shining white.
