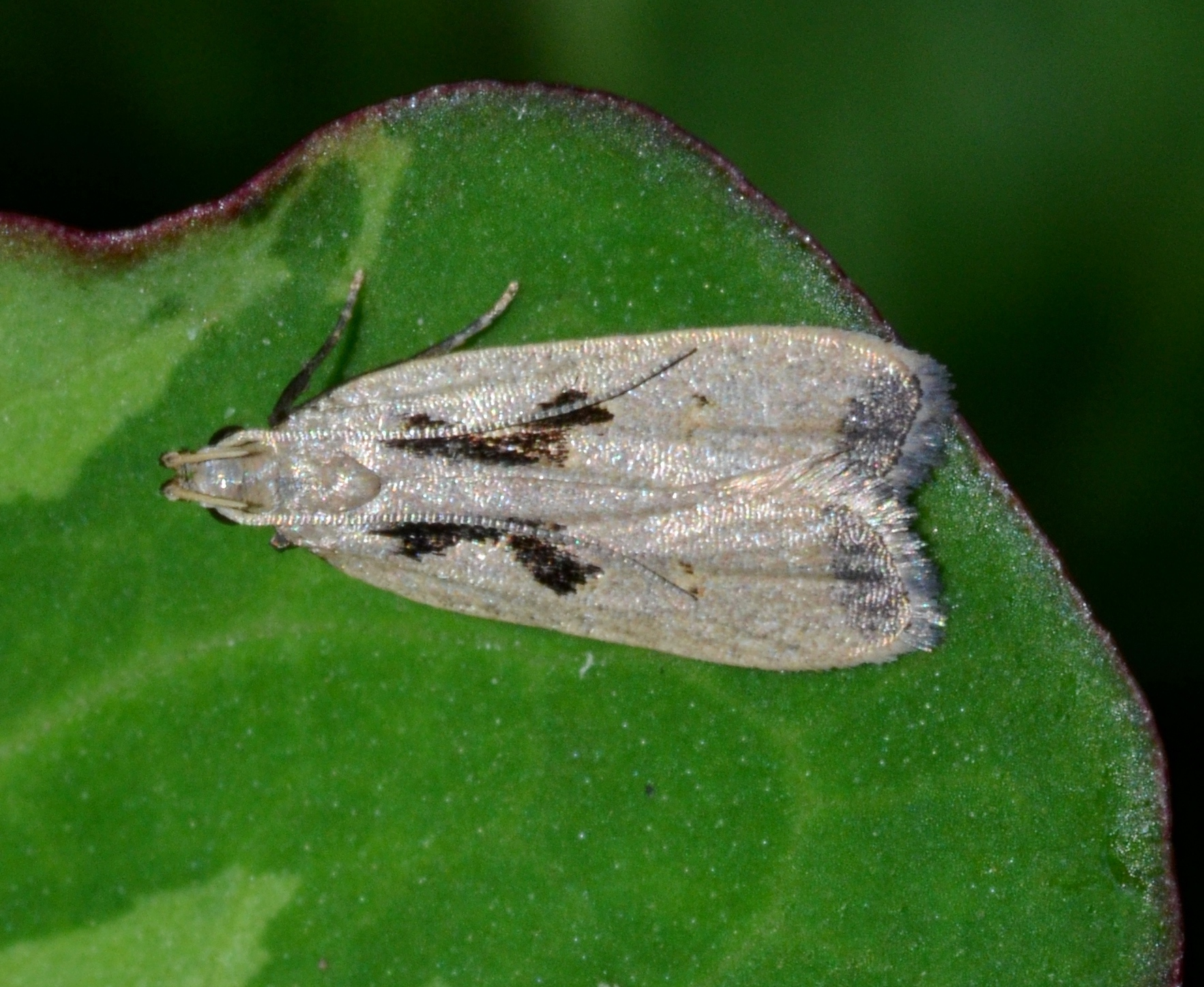

Scientific classification
- Kingdom: Animalia
- Phylum: Arthropoda
- Clade: Pancrustacea
- Class: Insecta
- Order: Lepidoptera
- Family: Gelechiidae
- Genus: Dichomeris
- Species: D. laetitia

Binomial name
- Dichomeris laetitia Hodges, 1986

= Dichomeris laetitia =

Species of moth

Dichomeris laetitia is a moth of the family Gelechiidae. It was described by Ronald W. Hodges in 1986. It is found in North America, where it has been recorded from Illinois to Oklahoma, Mississippi and Maryland.
