= Antaeotricha fuscorectangulata =

Scientific classification
- Kingdom: Animalia
- Phylum: Arthropoda
- Class: Insecta
- Order: Lepidoptera
- Family: Depressariidae
- Genus: Antaeotricha
- Species: A. fuscorectangulata

Binomial name
- Antaeotricha fuscorectangulata Duckworth, 1964

Species of moth

Antaeotricha fuscorectangulata is a moth in the family Depressariidae. It was described by W. Donald Duckworth in 1964. It is found in North America, where it has been recorded from Arizona.

The wingspan is 17–19 mm. The forewings are white shaded with ochreous, and with a rectangular fuscous area along the inner margin of the middle third and two fuscous costal spots, one near the middle and one at the apical fourth. From the latter, a row of black dots extends from the apex along the termen to the tornus. The apical fourth is flecked with black scales and there are two fuscous dots on the cell, one basal, one distal. The hindwings are light fuscous with a whitish costal margin.
