= Dichomeris hirculella =

Scientific classification
- Domain: Eukaryota
- Kingdom: Animalia
- Phylum: Arthropoda
- Class: Insecta
- Order: Lepidoptera
- Family: Gelechiidae
- Genus: Dichomeris
- Species: D. hirculella

Binomial name
- Dichomeris hirculella Busck, 1909

Species of moth

Dichomeris hirculella is a moth in the family Gelechiidae. It was described by August Busck in 1909. It is found in North America, where it has been recorded from Indiana, New Hampshire and Connecticut.

The wingspan is 11–12 mm. The forewings are ochreous fuscous, mottled with black scales and with larger irregular, blackish spots, of which two or three are found on the cell, one or two at the end of the cell, and five or six on the apical fourth. There is an indistinct series of blackish dots around the apical edge, more or less confluent. The hindwings are opaque, light fuscous.
