= Ethmia prattiella =

Scientific classification
- Domain: Eukaryota
- Kingdom: Animalia
- Phylum: Arthropoda
- Class: Insecta
- Order: Lepidoptera
- Family: Depressariidae
- Genus: Ethmia
- Species: E. prattiella

Binomial name
- Ethmia prattiella Busck, 1915

Species of moth

Ethmia prattiella is a moth in the family Depressariidae. It is found in southern North America from west-central Texas to eastern central Mexico.

The length of the forewings is 8.4–8.7 mm (0.33–0.34 in). The ground color of the forewings is white, with markings consisting of small black dots. The ground color of the hindwings is uniform pale brown. Adults are on wing in January (in central Mexico), in April (in Texas) and in July (in northern Mexico).
