= Coleophora vacciniivorella =

Scientific classification
- Kingdom: Animalia
- Phylum: Arthropoda
- Clade: Pancrustacea
- Class: Insecta
- Order: Lepidoptera
- Family: Coleophoridae
- Genus: Coleophora
- Species: C. vacciniivorella

Binomial name
- Coleophora vacciniivorella McDunnough, 1955

Species of moth

Coleophora vacciniivorella is a moth of the family Coleophoridae. It is found in North America.

The larvae feed on the leaves of Vaccinium species. They create a composite leaf case.
