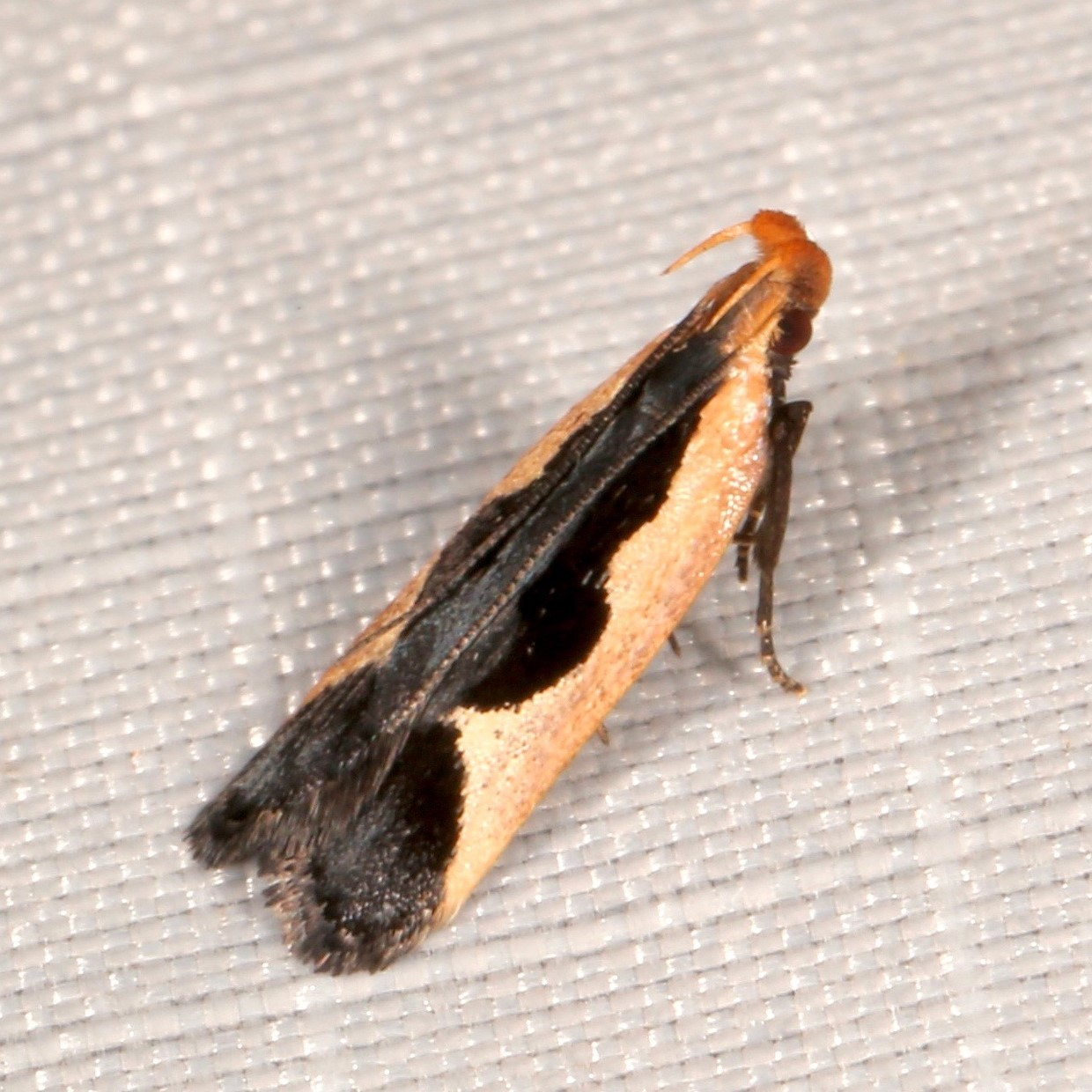

Scientific classification
- Kingdom: Animalia
- Phylum: Arthropoda
- Clade: Pancrustacea
- Class: Insecta
- Order: Lepidoptera
- Family: Gelechiidae
- Genus: Dichomeris
- Species: D. fistuca

Binomial name
- Dichomeris fistuca Hodges, 1986

= Dichomeris fistuca =

Species of moth

Dichomeris fistuca is a species of moth in the family Gelechiidae. It was first described by Ronald W. Hodges in 1986. It is found in North America, where it has been recorded from South Carolina, North Carolina, Georgia and Florida.
