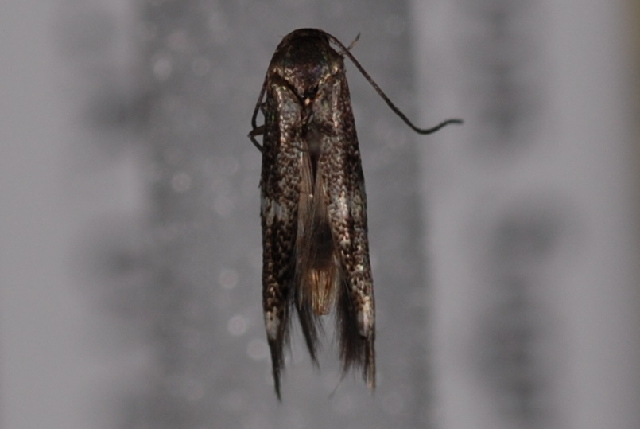

Scientific classification
- Domain: Eukaryota
- Kingdom: Animalia
- Phylum: Arthropoda
- Class: Insecta
- Order: Lepidoptera
- Family: Elachistidae
- Genus: Elachista
- Species: E. herbigrada

Binomial name
- Elachista herbigrada Braun, 1925

Synonyms
- Cosmiotes herbigrada

= Elachista herbigrada =

Species of moth

Elachista herbigrada is a moth of the family Elachistidae. It is found in North America, where it has been recorded from Alberta, Utah, Colorado and Arizona.
