= Dichomeris gleba =

Scientific classification
- Kingdom: Animalia
- Phylum: Arthropoda
- Clade: Pancrustacea
- Class: Insecta
- Order: Lepidoptera
- Family: Gelechiidae
- Genus: Dichomeris
- Species: D. gleba

Binomial name
- Dichomeris gleba Hodges, 1986

Species of moth

Dichomeris gleba is a moth in the family Gelechiidae. It was described by Ronald W. Hodges in 1986. It is found in North America, where it has been recorded from Illinois, Arkansas, Missouri, Texas, Colorado and New Mexico.

The wingspan is about 16 mm. Adults have been recorded on wing from June to August and in November.
