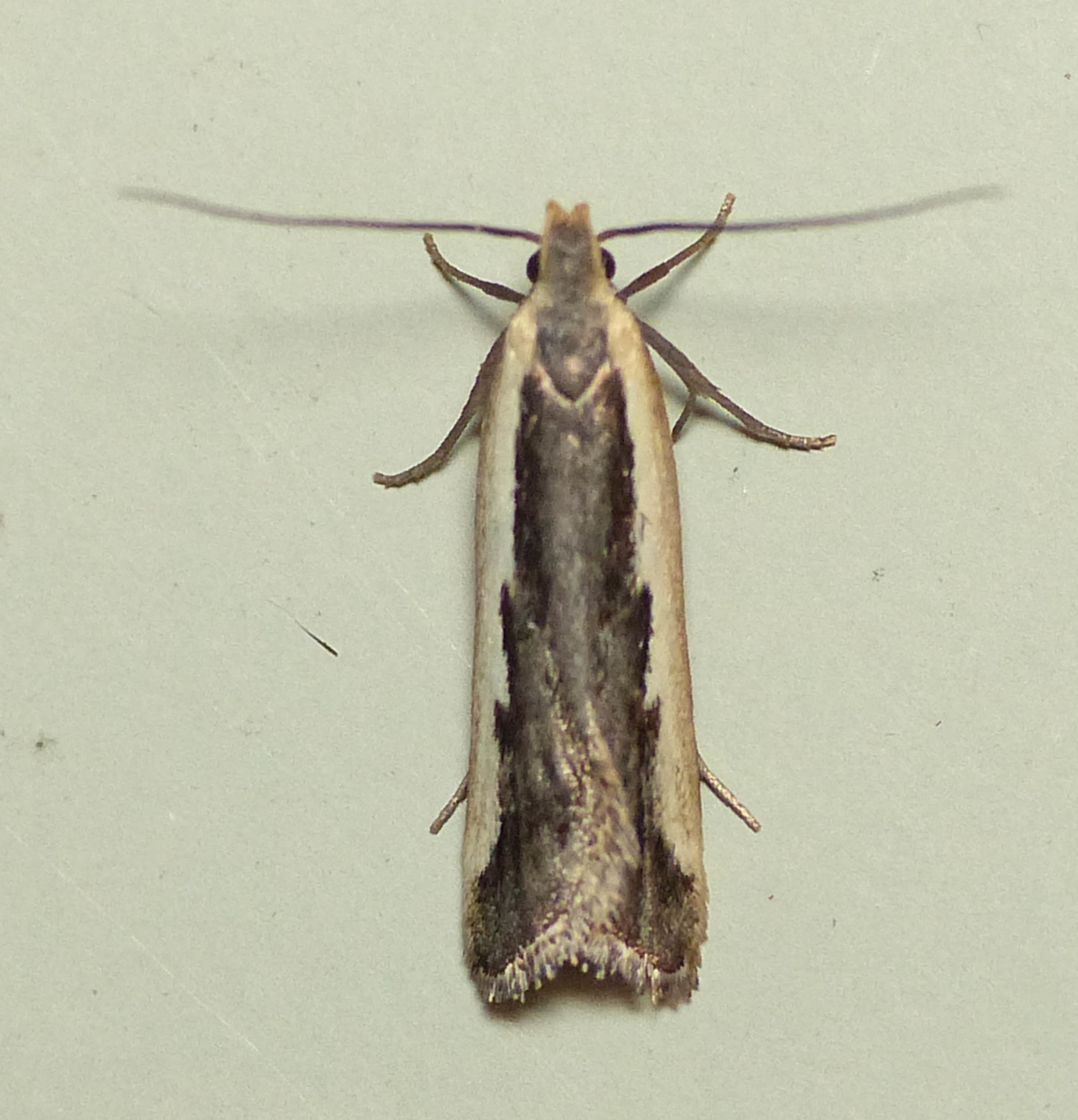
- Dichomeris isa, New York

Scientific classification
- Kingdom: Animalia
- Phylum: Arthropoda
- Clade: Pancrustacea
- Class: Insecta
- Order: Lepidoptera
- Family: Gelechiidae
- Genus: Dichomeris
- Species: D. isa

Binomial name
- Dichomeris isa Hodges, 1986

= Dichomeris isa =

Species of moth

Dichomeris isa is a moth in the family Gelechiidae. It was described by Ronald W. Hodges in 1986. It is found in North America, where it has been recorded from Oklahoma, Arkansas, Florida, Georgia, Illinois, Kentucky, Massachusetts, Mississippi, Missouri, New Jersey, New York, North Carolina, Ohio, Pennsylvania, Tennessee, Texas and Ontario.

The wingspan is about 13 mm.
