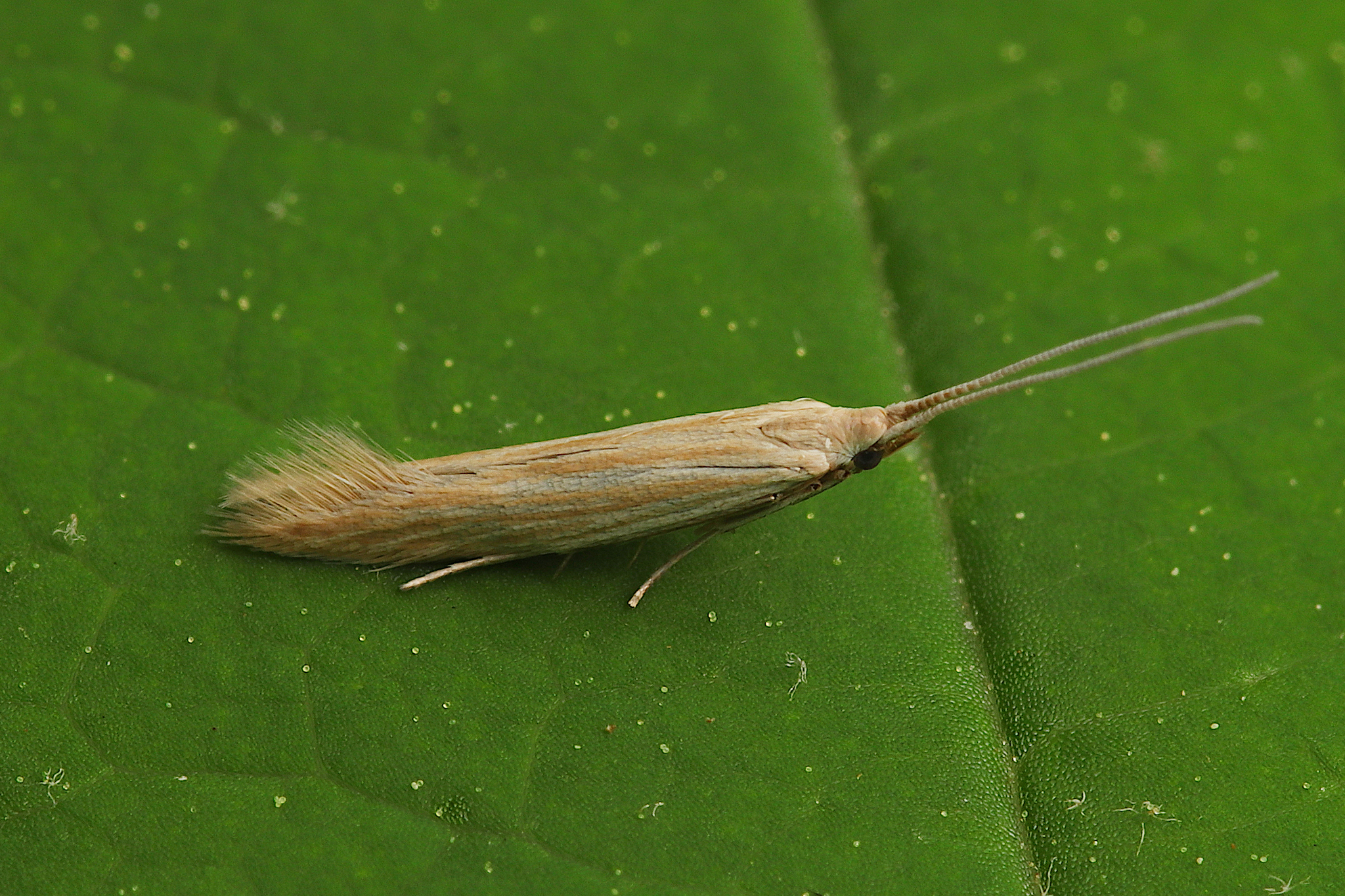
- Coleophora mcdunnoughiella in Virginia, United States

Scientific classification
- Kingdom: Animalia
- Phylum: Arthropoda
- Class: Insecta
- Order: Lepidoptera
- Family: Coleophoridae
- Genus: Coleophora
- Species: C. mcdunnoughiella

Binomial name
- Coleophora mcdunnoughiella Oudejans, 1971

Synonyms
- Coleophora dubiella McDunnough, 1946

= Coleophora mcdunnoughiella =

Species of moth

Coleophora mcdunnoughiella is a species of moth belong to the family Coleophoridae. It is found on North America in Canada and the United States.
