= Coleophora asterosella =

Scientific classification
- Kingdom: Animalia
- Phylum: Arthropoda
- Class: Insecta
- Order: Lepidoptera
- Family: Coleophoridae
- Genus: Coleophora
- Species: C. asterosella

Binomial name
- Coleophora asterosella McDunnough, 1944

Species of moth

Coleophora asterosella is a moth of the family Coleophoridae. It is found in Canada, including Ontario.

The larvae feed on the leaves of Aster tradescanthi.
