= Elachista maritimella =

Scientific classification
- Domain: Eukaryota
- Kingdom: Animalia
- Phylum: Arthropoda
- Class: Insecta
- Order: Lepidoptera
- Family: Elachistidae
- Genus: Elachista
- Species: E. maritimella

Binomial name
- Elachista maritimella McDunnough, 1942

Species of moth

Elachista maritimella is a moth of the family Elachistidae first described by James Halliday McDunnough in 1942. It is found in Canada, where it has been recorded from New Brunswick, Newfoundland, Nova Scotia, Quebec, Saskatchewan and Alberta. The habitat consists of salt coastal meadows and vegetation bordering roads.

The wingspan is 9–10 mm.
