= Dichomeris purpureofusca =

Scientific classification
- Domain: Eukaryota
- Kingdom: Animalia
- Phylum: Arthropoda
- Class: Insecta
- Order: Lepidoptera
- Family: Gelechiidae
- Genus: Dichomeris
- Species: D. purpureofusca

Binomial name
- Dichomeris purpureofusca (Walsingham, 1882)

Synonyms
- Gelechia (Trichotaphe) purpureofusca Walsingham, 1882

Species of moth

Dichomeris purpureofusca is a moth in the family Gelechiidae. It was described by Thomas de Grey, 6th Baron Walsingham, in 1882. It is found in North America, where it has been recorded from Nova Scotia to New Jersey, the Northwest Territories, Alberta and South Dakota.

The wingspan is about 18 mm (0.71 in). The forewings are deep purplish fuscous. The hindwings are brownish fuscous. Adults are on wing from June to August.
