= Coleophora sparsiatomella =

Scientific classification
- Kingdom: Animalia
- Phylum: Arthropoda
- Class: Insecta
- Order: Lepidoptera
- Family: Coleophoridae
- Genus: Coleophora
- Species: C. sparsiatomella

Binomial name
- Coleophora sparsiatomella McDunnough, 1941

Species of moth

Coleophora sparsiatomella is a moth of the family Coleophoridae. It is found in Canada, including Ontario.
