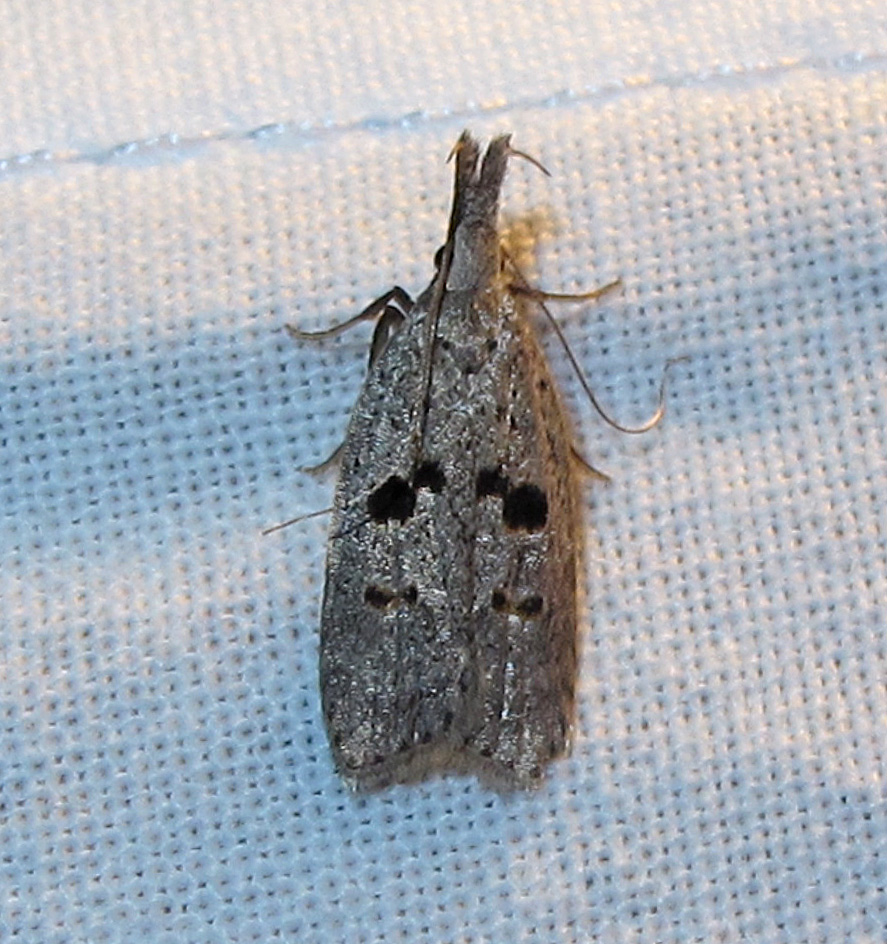

Scientific classification
- Kingdom: Animalia
- Phylum: Arthropoda
- Class: Insecta
- Order: Lepidoptera
- Family: Gelechiidae
- Genus: Dichomeris
- Species: D. glenni

Binomial name
- Dichomeris glenni J. F. G. Clarke, 1947

= Dichomeris glenni =

Species of moth

Dichomeris glenni is a moth in the family Gelechiidae. It was described by John Frederick Gates Clarke in 1947. It is found in North America, where it has been recorded from Florida, Illinois, Indiana, Kansas, Louisiana, Mississippi, Oklahoma, Ontario, Texas and Wisconsin.
