= Dichomeris mimesis =

Scientific classification
- Kingdom: Animalia
- Phylum: Arthropoda
- Clade: Pancrustacea
- Class: Insecta
- Order: Lepidoptera
- Family: Gelechiidae
- Genus: Dichomeris
- Species: D. mimesis

Binomial name
- Dichomeris mimesis Hodges, 1986

Species of moth

Dichomeris mimesis is a moth in the family Gelechiidae. It was described by Ronald W. Hodges in 1986. It is found in North America, where it has been recorded from Texas, Mississippi and Florida.
