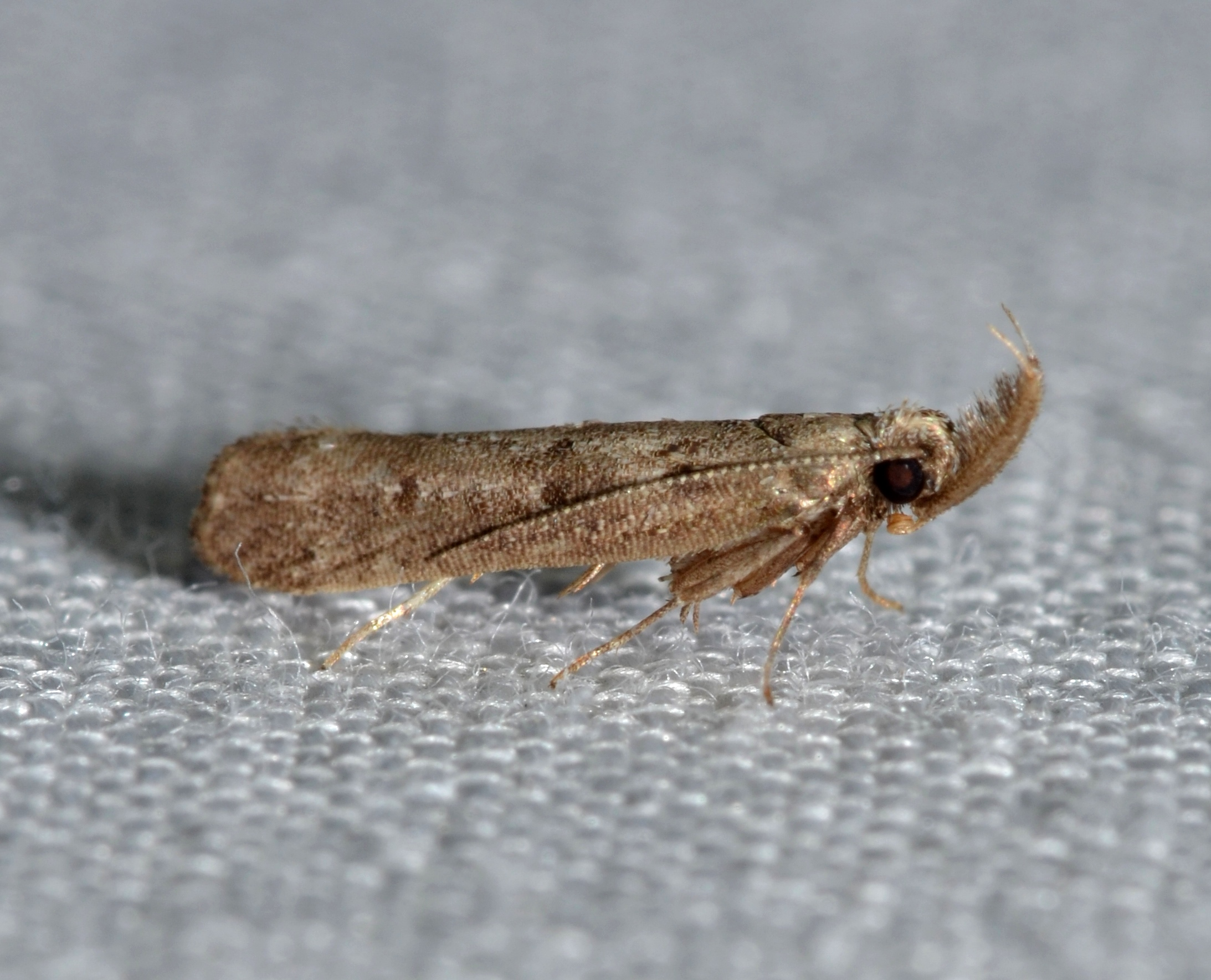

Scientific classification
- Kingdom: Animalia
- Phylum: Arthropoda
- Clade: Pancrustacea
- Class: Insecta
- Order: Lepidoptera
- Family: Gelechiidae
- Genus: Dichomeris
- Species: D. inversella

Binomial name
- Dichomeris inversella (Zeller, 1873)

Synonyms
- Epicorthylis inversella Zeller, 1873

= Dichomeris inversella =

Species of moth

Dichomeris inversella is a moth of the family Gelechiidae. It was described by Philipp Christoph Zeller in 1873. It is found in North America, where it has been recorded from Wisconsin and southern Ontario, east to New Jersey, south to Florida and west to central Texas and Oklahoma.

The length of the forewings is 6–8 mm (0.24–0.31 in). Adults are on wing from May to August in most of the range.

The larvae feed on Carya species.
