= Dichomeris simpliciella =

Scientific classification
- Domain: Eukaryota
- Kingdom: Animalia
- Phylum: Arthropoda
- Class: Insecta
- Order: Lepidoptera
- Family: Gelechiidae
- Genus: Dichomeris
- Species: D. simpliciella

Binomial name
- Dichomeris simpliciella (Busck, 1904)

Synonyms
- Trichotaphe simpliciella Busck, 1904; Trichotaphe hemiclina Meyrick, 1929

Species of moth

Dichomeris simpliciella is a moth in the family Gelechiidae. It was described by August Busck in 1904. It is found in North America, where it has been recorded from southern Alberta to Texas, eastern Washington, south-eastern Nevada and Arizona. It has also been recorded from northern Mexico.

The wingspan is about 18 mm. The forewings are divided in two nearly equal longitudinal parts, the costal part is light ocherous and the dorsal somewhat larger part dark fuscous. The dividing line is sharp and nearly straight from the base of the wing to the apex, but the fuscous part is slightly overlaid with ochreous in the apical third, except along the termen, where the dark colour is rather emphasized before the cilia. At the end of the cell is a very light ochreous round dot. Adults are on wing from April to June and again from August to November.
