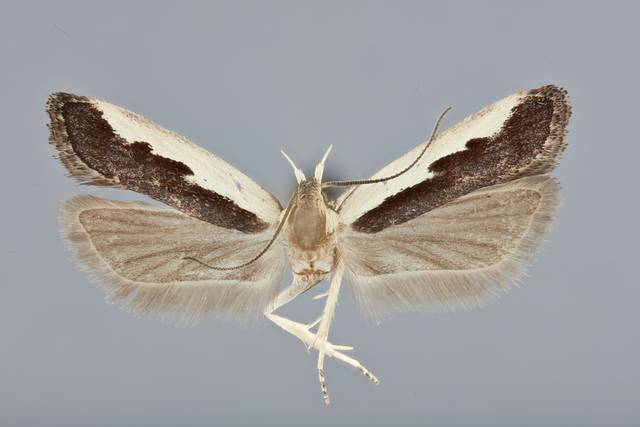
- An image of a Dichomeris xanthoa taken for the Smithsonian National Museum of Natural History.

Scientific classification
- Kingdom: Animalia
- Phylum: Arthropoda
- Clade: Pancrustacea
- Class: Insecta
- Order: Lepidoptera
- Family: Gelechiidae
- Genus: Dichomeris
- Species: D. xanthoa

Binomial name
- Dichomeris xanthoa Hodges, 1986

= Dichomeris xanthoa =

Species of moth

Dichomeris xanthoa is a moth in the family Gelechiidae. It was described by Ronald W. Hodges in 1986. It is found in North America, where it has been recorded from Nebraska, Illinois, Indiana, North Carolina, Tennessee, Florida, Mississippi and Manitoba.
