= Dichomeris hypochloa =

Scientific classification
- Domain: Eukaryota
- Kingdom: Animalia
- Phylum: Arthropoda
- Class: Insecta
- Order: Lepidoptera
- Family: Gelechiidae
- Genus: Dichomeris
- Species: D. hypochloa

Binomial name
- Dichomeris hypochloa Walsingham, 1911

Species of moth

Dichomeris hypochloa is a moth in the family Gelechiidae. It was described by Thomas de Grey, 6th Baron Walsingham, in 1911. It is found in Mexico (Sonora) and the southern United States, where it has been recorded from Arizona.

The wingspan is about 14 mm (0.55 in). The forewings are pale cream-ochreous, with a brownish spot at the end of the cell, preceded by another beyond the middle of the fold, both very faintly indicated. There is a strong dark chestnut-brown streak along the upper part of the termen. The hindwings are rosy grey, with a very pale ochreous cilia.
