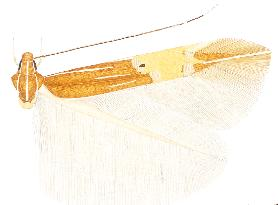

Scientific classification
- Kingdom: Animalia
- Phylum: Arthropoda
- Clade: Pancrustacea
- Class: Insecta
- Order: Lepidoptera
- Family: Cosmopterigidae
- Genus: Cosmopterix
- Species: C. facunda

Binomial name
- Cosmopterix facunda Hodges, 1978

= Cosmopterix facunda =

Species of moth

Cosmopterix facunda is a moth of the family Cosmopterigidae. It is known from Texas, United States.

Adults were collected in March.

== Description ==
Female. Forewing length 5.7 mm. Head: frons shining pale ochreous, vertex and neck tufts shining ochreous-brown, medially and laterally lined white, collar ochreous-brown; Labial palpus first segment very short, white, second segment ochreous-grey with white longitudinal lines laterally and ventrally, remaining parts missing; scape dark brown, with white anterior and posterior lines, white ventrally, antenna shining dark brown, a white line from base to beyond one-half, followed towards apex by respectively a more or less annulated part of approximately 15 segments, four whitish, two dark brown, two white, nine dark brown and nine white segments at apex. Thorax and tegulae ochreous-brown, thorax with a white median line, tegulae lined white inwardly. Legs: foreleg ochreous-grey with a white line on tibia and tarsal segments one to three and five, segment four white in apical half, femora of midleg and hindleg ochreous-white, remaining parts greyish ochreous, tibiae of midleg and hindleg with oblique basal and medial white lines and white apical rings, tarsal segments one to three of midleg dorsally white in apical half, segment five entirely white, tarsal segments of hindleg as midleg but segment four also dorsally white, spurs white, ventrally greyish ochreous. Forewing ochreous-brown, five white lines in the basal area, a costal from one-third to the transverse fascia, a subcostal from base to one-third, bending from costa in distal half, a straight medial above fold, from one-quarter to just before the transverse fascia, a subdorsal below fold, slightly oblique, as long as the medial but just beyond it, a dorsal from beyond base to the transverse fascia, a broad pale yellow transverse fascia beyond the middle, narrowed towards dorsum, with a small apical protrusion, bordered at the inner edge by two tubercular silver metallic subcostal and subdorsal spots, the subcostal spot outwardly with a patch of blackish brown scales, the subdorsal spot smaller than the subcostal and further from base, bordered at the outer edge by two tubercular silver metallic costal and dorsal spots, almost opposite each other and inwardly lined ochreous-brown, the dorsal spot about twice as large as the costal, a broad white costal streak from the outer costal spot, a shining white apical line from the apical protrusion, cilia pale ochreous, more greyish at apex. Hindwing shining pale ochreous-white, cilia pale ochreous. Underside: forewing shining pale ochreous-grey, darker at apex, the white apex line distinctly visible, hindwing shining pale ochreous-grey. Abdomen not examined (already dissected).
