= Antaeotricha agrioschista =

Scientific classification
- Kingdom: Animalia
- Phylum: Arthropoda
- Clade: Pancrustacea
- Class: Insecta
- Order: Lepidoptera
- Family: Depressariidae
- Genus: Antaeotricha
- Species: A. agrioschista

Binomial name
- Antaeotricha agrioschista (Meyrick, 1927)

Synonyms
- Stenoma agrioschista Meyrick, 1927

Species of moth in genus Antaeotricha

Antaeotricha agrioschista is a moth in the family Depressariidae. It was described by Edward Meyrick in 1927. It is found in North America, where it has been recorded from Texas.

The wingspan is 20–21 mm. The forewings are light grey overlaid with white and sprinkled dark fuscous. There is a short dark fuscous transverse mark from the base of the costa and three irregular very oblique dark fuscous lines from the costa, distinct on the costal half, lighter and very indistinct on the dorsal half, the plical and second discal stigmata forming linear marks at the end of the dark portion of the first two lines, the third line in some females absorbed into an elongate costal spot. There are also some terminal dots or marks more or less distinctly indicated. The hindwings are light grey.
