= Antaeotricha thomasi =

Scientific classification
- Domain: Eukaryota
- Kingdom: Animalia
- Phylum: Arthropoda
- Class: Insecta
- Order: Lepidoptera
- Family: Depressariidae
- Genus: Antaeotricha
- Species: A. thomasi

Binomial name
- Antaeotricha thomasi (Barnes & Busck, 1920)

Synonyms
- Stenoma thomasi Barnes & Busck, 1920

Species of moth

Antaeotricha thomasi is a moth in the family Depressariidae. It was described by William Barnes and August Busck in 1920. It is found in North America, where it has been recorded from Arizona, New Mexico and Colorado.

The wingspan is 21–24 mm. The forewings are yellowish creamy white without any markings and the hindwings are pale yellowish white.
