= Ethmia mimihagenella =

Scientific classification
- Kingdom: Animalia
- Phylum: Arthropoda
- Clade: Pancrustacea
- Class: Insecta
- Order: Lepidoptera
- Family: Depressariidae
- Genus: Ethmia
- Species: E. mimihagenella

Binomial name
- Ethmia mimihagenella Powell, 1973

Species of moth

Ethmia mimihagenella is a moth in the family Depressariidae. It is found in the United States in New Mexico, Arizona and Texas.

The length of the forewings is 10.3–12.1 mm (0.41–0.48 in). The ground color of the forewings is white with a dark pattern.
