= Dichomeris pelta =

Scientific classification
- Kingdom: Animalia
- Phylum: Arthropoda
- Clade: Pancrustacea
- Class: Insecta
- Order: Lepidoptera
- Family: Gelechiidae
- Genus: Dichomeris
- Species: D. pelta

Binomial name
- Dichomeris pelta Hodges, 1986

Species of moth

Dichomeris pelta is a moth in the family Gelechiidae. It was described by Ronald W. Hodges in 1986. It is found in North America, where it has been recorded from South Carolina and Florida.

Adults have been recorded on wing from January to June and in October and December.
