= Gelechia unistrigella =

Scientific classification
- Kingdom: Animalia
- Phylum: Arthropoda
- Clade: Pancrustacea
- Class: Insecta
- Order: Lepidoptera
- Family: Gelechiidae
- Genus: Gelechia
- Species: G. unistrigella

Binomial name
- Gelechia unistrigella Chambers, 1873

Species of moth

Gelechia unistrigella is a moth of the family Gelechiidae. It was described by Vactor Tousey Chambers in 1873. It is found in North America, where it has been recorded from Kentucky and California.

The forewings are very sparsely dusted with pale fuscous in the apical portion. There is a fuscous spot about the middle of the costa, with two other small ones between it and the dorsal margin. A fuscous streak begins at the base of the costal margin and extends along that margin for a short distance, then passing obliquely backwards across the wing, but not quite reaching the dorsal margin.
