= Gelechia packardella =

Scientific classification
- Kingdom: Animalia
- Phylum: Arthropoda
- Clade: Pancrustacea
- Class: Insecta
- Order: Lepidoptera
- Family: Gelechiidae
- Genus: Gelechia
- Species: G. packardella

Binomial name
- Gelechia packardella Chambers, 1877

Species of moth

Gelechia packardella is a moth of the family Gelechiidae. It was described by Vactor Tousey Chambers in 1877. It is found in North America, where it has been recorded from Colorado.

The forewings are black, the dorsal margin to the fold white from the base to the cilia, the black color projecting across the fold into the white, but not far enough to touch the margin. There is a narrow white dorsal streak about the apical fourth of the wing-length pointing a little obliquely backward, and indistinctly connected with a nearly square costal white spot, which is a little farther back than the dorsal streak. The disc is somewhat obscurely streaked with ocherous, and under a lens small white specks and scales appear scattered in the apical part of the wing.
