= Gelechia maculatusella =

Scientific classification
- Kingdom: Animalia
- Phylum: Arthropoda
- Clade: Pancrustacea
- Class: Insecta
- Order: Lepidoptera
- Family: Gelechiidae
- Genus: Gelechia
- Species: G. maculatusella

Binomial name
- Gelechia maculatusella Chambers, 1875

Species of moth

Gelechia maculatusella is a moth of the family Gelechiidae. It is found in North America, where it has been recorded from California.

The forewings are ashen white sprinkled with numerous small dark brown dots, a row of which extends along the entire costal margin which is also tinged with roseate. The wing beneath the fold to the dorsal margin is also somewhat tinged with roseate, with a few small brown spots. In some lights a large part of the wing appears strongly tinged with roseate.
