= Ethmia apicipunctella =

Scientific classification
- Kingdom: Animalia
- Phylum: Arthropoda
- Clade: Pancrustacea
- Class: Insecta
- Order: Lepidoptera
- Family: Depressariidae
- Genus: Ethmia
- Species: E. apicipunctella

Binomial name
- Ethmia apicipunctella (Chambers, 1875)

Synonyms
- Hyponomeuta apicipunctella Chambers, 1875; Psecadia apicipunctella; Ethmia zavalla Busck, 1915

Species of moth

Ethmia apicipunctella is a moth in the family Depressariidae. It is found in North America from southern Texas and Nuevo León to eastern Arizona and adjoining areas of Mexico. In the north, the range extends into Colorado and southern Wyoming.

The length of the forewings is 7.2–9.4 mm (0.28–0.37 in). The ground color of the forewings is white or pale gray with black spots that are variable in size. The ground color of the hindwings is whitish, slightly tinged with brownish toward the apical area. Adults are on wing from March to July.
