= Gelechia grisseochrella =

Scientific classification
- Kingdom: Animalia
- Phylum: Arthropoda
- Clade: Pancrustacea
- Class: Insecta
- Order: Lepidoptera
- Family: Gelechiidae
- Genus: Gelechia
- Species: G. grisseochrella

Binomial name
- Gelechia grisseochrella Chambers, 1875

Species of moth

Gelechia grisseochrella is a moth of the family Gelechiidae. It is found in North America, where it has been recorded from California.

There is a dark brown streak perpendicular to the base of the dorsal margin, a small dark brown spot just above the fold (sometimes touching it), before the middle. Following is an oblong oblique dark brown spot on the fold, very narrowly margined above with whitish scales and there is a row of small dark brown spots along the costa, one at the end of the cell, and a row of them around the apex at the base of the cilia.
