= Caloptilia juglandiella =

Scientific classification
- Kingdom: Animalia
- Phylum: Arthropoda
- Clade: Pancrustacea
- Class: Insecta
- Order: Lepidoptera
- Family: Gracillariidae
- Genus: Caloptilia
- Species: C. juglandiella

Binomial name
- Caloptilia juglandiella (Chambers, 1872)

Synonyms
- Caloptilia juglandisnigracella (Chambers, 1873); Caloptilia juglandisnigraeella (Chambers, 1873); Caloptilia juglandisnigrella (Chambers, 1872)

Species of moth

Caloptilia juglandiella is a moth of the family Gracillariidae. It is known from the United States (including Kentucky, Maine, Ohio and Missouri).

The larvae feed on Juglans nigra. They mine the leaves of their host plant.
