= Gelechia obscurella =

Scientific classification
- Kingdom: Animalia
- Phylum: Arthropoda
- Clade: Pancrustacea
- Class: Insecta
- Order: Lepidoptera
- Family: Gelechiidae
- Genus: Gelechia
- Species: G. obscurella

Binomial name
- Gelechia obscurella Chambers, 1872

Synonyms
- Gelechia perobscurella Walsingham, 1903

Species of moth

Gelechia obscurella is a moth in the family Gelechiidae. It is found in North America, where it has been recorded in Kentucky.

The forewings are ochreous, densely flecked with dark brown.
