= Coleophora quadrilineella =

Scientific classification
- Kingdom: Animalia
- Phylum: Arthropoda
- Clade: Pancrustacea
- Class: Insecta
- Order: Lepidoptera
- Family: Coleophoridae
- Genus: Coleophora
- Species: C. quadrilineella

Binomial name
- Coleophora quadrilineella Chambers, 1878

Species of moth

Coleophora quadrilineella is a moth of the family Coleophoridae. It is found in the United States, including Kentucky.

The larvae feed on the seeds of Juncus species. They create a tubular silken seed case.
