= Gelechia wacoella =

Scientific classification
- Kingdom: Animalia
- Phylum: Arthropoda
- Clade: Pancrustacea
- Class: Insecta
- Order: Lepidoptera
- Family: Gelechiidae
- Genus: Gelechia
- Species: G. wacoella

Binomial name
- Gelechia wacoella Chambers, 1874

Species of moth

Gelechia wacoella is a moth of the family Gelechiidae. It is found in North America, where it has been recorded from Texas.

The forewings are dark brown with two ochreous spots on the costal margin near the base, another at the beginning of the cilia, and two small spots of the same hue on the fold before the middle.
