= Gelechia thoracestrigella =

Scientific classification
- Kingdom: Animalia
- Phylum: Arthropoda
- Clade: Pancrustacea
- Class: Insecta
- Order: Lepidoptera
- Family: Gelechiidae
- Genus: Gelechia
- Species: G. thoracestrigella

Binomial name
- Gelechia thoracestrigella Chambers, 1875

Species of moth

Gelechia thoracestrigella is a moth of the family Gelechiidae. It is found in North America, where it has been recorded from California and Arizona.

The forewings are ochreous, dusted with brown. This dusting is dense at the base of the costa and at the base of the wing, it is aggregated into three indistinct spots, behind which are three others, and behind these, two or three others. These spots form three oblique rows, and behind them the dusting increases in quantity to the apex.
