= Gelechia anarsiella =

Scientific classification
- Kingdom: Animalia
- Phylum: Arthropoda
- Clade: Pancrustacea
- Class: Insecta
- Order: Lepidoptera
- Family: Gelechiidae
- Genus: Gelechia
- Species: G. anarsiella

Binomial name
- Gelechia anarsiella Chambers, 1877

Species of moth

Gelechia anarsiella is a moth of the family Gelechiidae. It is found in North America, where it has been recorded from Colorado.

There are two or three microscopic whitish specks or white scales scattered over the wings, and the cilia are pale-grey, dusted with dark grey or blackish scales. The hindwings are of a bluish smoky hue.

The larvae feed on Ceanothus species, spinning a delicate web over the leaf it is feeding on, hiding in a silken tube in a folded leaf or between leaves. The larvae are green, faintly brownish shaded to the spiracles, then clear green. The head is shining black.
