= Gelechia palpialbella =

Scientific classification
- Kingdom: Animalia
- Phylum: Arthropoda
- Clade: Pancrustacea
- Class: Insecta
- Order: Lepidoptera
- Family: Gelechiidae
- Genus: Gelechia
- Species: G. palpialbella

Binomial name
- Gelechia palpialbella Chambers, 1875

Species of moth

Gelechia palpialbella is a moth of the family Gelechiidae. It is found in North America, where it has been recorded from Texas.

The forewings are dark greyish-brown, with obscure small spots of dark velvety-brown on the wings.
