= Gelechia discostrigella =

Scientific classification
- Kingdom: Animalia
- Phylum: Arthropoda
- Clade: Pancrustacea
- Class: Insecta
- Order: Lepidoptera
- Family: Gelechiidae
- Genus: Gelechia
- Species: G. discostrigella

Binomial name
- Gelechia discostrigella Chambers, 1875

Species of moth

Gelechia discostrigella is a moth of the family Gelechiidae. It is found in North America, where it has been recorded from California.

The base of the wings is purplish-brown beyond which to the middle they are creamy white, that colour extending along the dorsal margin to a point beyond the middle but scarcely to the middle on the costal margin. On the dorsal margin, about the middle and in the creamy white portion is an ocherous spot, and along the costal margin are two or three small brownish spots also in the creamy white part of the wing, which along the costal margin about the middle passes gradually into ocherous-yellow, as it also does on the dorsal margin beyond the middle. This ocherous hue overspreads the whole apical half of the wing. On the disc, before the middle, margining the creamy white anterior part of the wing, is an oblique black transverse spot which is narrowly separated by ocherous-yellow scales from a large somewhat diffuse brownish patch which covers the end of the cell and fades out gradually into the ocherous hue of that part of the wing. The extreme costa is marked throughout its length by small purple brown spots, which also extend around the apex at the base of the cilia which are greyish ocherous.
