= Gelechia discoanulella =

Scientific classification
- Kingdom: Animalia
- Phylum: Arthropoda
- Clade: Pancrustacea
- Class: Insecta
- Order: Lepidoptera
- Family: Gelechiidae
- Genus: Gelechia
- Species: G. discoanulella

Binomial name
- Gelechia discoanulella Chambers, 1875

Synonyms
- Gelechia discoannulella

Species of moth

Gelechia discoanulella is a moth of the family Gelechiidae. It is found in North America, where it has been recorded from Texas.

The forewings are very pale ocherous, so densely dusted with greyish fuscus as almost entirely to conceal the ground color. The fold is ochreous yellow with two or three brown spots and there are two or three small brown spots on the disc, and a row of them around the apex. At the end of the discal cell is a pale ochreous annulus with a central dark brown spot.
