= Gelechia amorphella =

Scientific classification
- Kingdom: Animalia
- Phylum: Arthropoda
- Clade: Pancrustacea
- Class: Insecta
- Order: Lepidoptera
- Family: Gelechiidae
- Genus: Gelechia
- Species: G. amorphella

Binomial name
- Gelechia amorphella Chambers, 1877

Species of moth

Gelechia amorphella is a moth of the family Gelechiidae. It was described by Vactor Tousey Chambers in 1877. It is found in North America, where it has been recorded from Colorado.

Adults are dark steel gray, with two minute darker spots, one on the disc, the other at the end of the cell.
