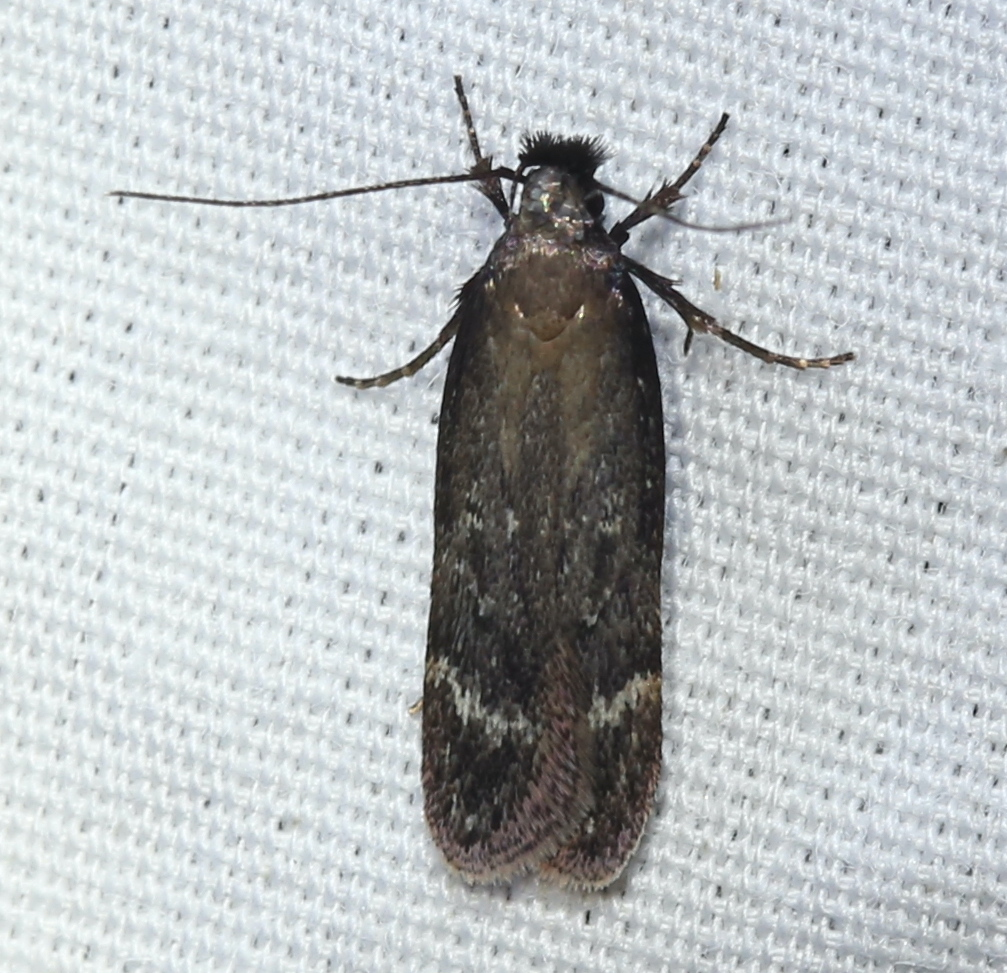

Scientific classification
- Kingdom: Animalia
- Phylum: Arthropoda
- Clade: Pancrustacea
- Class: Insecta
- Order: Lepidoptera
- Family: Gelechiidae
- Genus: Gelechia
- Species: G. albisparsella

Binomial name
- Gelechia albisparsella (Chambers, 1872)

Synonyms
- Depressaria albisparsella Chambers, 1872; Depressaria fuscoluteella Chambers, 1872; Cirrha platanella Chambers, 1872

= Gelechia albisparsella =

Species of moth

Gelechia albisparsella is a moth of the family Gelechiidae. It is found in North America, where it has been recorded from Alabama, Illinois, Indiana, Kentucky, Louisiana, Massachusetts, Mississippi, Ohio and Tennessee.

The wingspan is about 15 mm. Adults are dark brown, the forewings faintly suffused with ochreous and sparsely and indistinctly sprinkled with white scales, which at the beginning of the costal cilia become a little more distinct, forming a narrow, clouded whitish fascia pointing a little obliquely backwards.

The larvae feed on Platanus occidentalis. They skeletonize the leaves of their host plant.
