= Coleophora multipulvella =

Scientific classification
- Kingdom: Animalia
- Phylum: Arthropoda
- Clade: Pancrustacea
- Class: Insecta
- Order: Lepidoptera
- Family: Coleophoridae
- Genus: Coleophora
- Species: C. multipulvella

Binomial name
- Coleophora multipulvella Chambers, 1878

Synonyms
- Coleophora malivorella Riley, 1878; Coleophora cinerella Chambers, 1878; Coleophora castipennella Walsingham, 1882; Coleophora atlantica Heinrich, 1920

Species of moth

Coleophora multipulvella, the pistol casebearer, is a moth of the family Coleophoridae. It is found in North America, from Virginia to Kansas and northward to Canada. It is also known from California and Utah.
