= Ethmia hagenella =

Scientific classification
- Kingdom: Animalia
- Phylum: Arthropoda
- Clade: Pancrustacea
- Class: Insecta
- Order: Lepidoptera
- Family: Depressariidae
- Genus: Ethmia
- Species: E. hagenella

Binomial name
- Ethmia hagenella (Chambers, 1878)

Synonyms
- Anesychia hagenella Chambers, 1878; Ethmia josephinella Dyar, 1902

Species of moth

Ethmia hagenella is a moth in the family Depressariidae. It is found in the United States in Texas and New Mexico.

The length of the forewings is 9.1–11.9 mm (0.36–0.47 in). The ground color of the forewings is white, although the costal area is broadly pale brown. The ground color of the hindwings is white, but pale brownish toward the distal margins, concentrated into darker spots between the veins. Adults of subspecies hagenella are on wing in January, March, April and October in multiple generations per year, while adults of subspecies josephinella are on wing from late March to May and in September, probably also in multiple generations.

== Subspecies ==
- Ethmia hagenella hagenella (central Texas)
- Ethtnia hagenella josephinella (Dyar, 1902) (extreme western Texas and southern New Mexico)
