= Gelechia bianulella =

Scientific classification
- Kingdom: Animalia
- Phylum: Arthropoda
- Clade: Pancrustacea
- Class: Insecta
- Order: Lepidoptera
- Family: Gelechiidae
- Genus: Gelechia
- Species: G. bianulella

Binomial name
- Gelechia bianulella (Chambers, 1875)

Synonyms
- Oeseis bianulella Chambers, 1875; Gelechia ocellella Chambers, 1877; Nothris melanchlora Meyrick, 1929

Species of moth

Gelechia bianulella is a moth of the family Gelechiidae. It is found in North America, where it has been recorded from California, Colorado, Montana, New Mexico, Oklahoma and Texas.
