= Veneranda =

Veneranda may be:

- Fernando Veneranda
- Veneranda Nzambazamariya
- Saint Veneranda
- Gelechia veneranda
