= Gelechia griseaella =

Scientific classification
- Kingdom: Animalia
- Phylum: Arthropoda
- Clade: Pancrustacea
- Class: Insecta
- Order: Lepidoptera
- Family: Gelechiidae
- Genus: Gelechia
- Species: G. griseaella

Binomial name
- Gelechia griseaella (Chambers, 1872)

Synonyms
- Parasia griseaella Chambers, 1872

Species of moth

Gelechia griseaella is a moth of the family Gelechiidae. It is found in North America, where it has been recorded from Ontario.

The forewings are white, overlaid with brown, so as to give a greyish cast. In the costal and apical portions of the wing the brown scales are condensed into numerous irregular and indefinite spots and streaks.
