= Gelechia capiteochrella =

Scientific classification
- Kingdom: Animalia
- Phylum: Arthropoda
- Clade: Pancrustacea
- Class: Insecta
- Order: Lepidoptera
- Family: Gelechiidae
- Genus: Gelechia
- Species: G. capiteochrella

Binomial name
- Gelechia capiteochrella Chambers, 1875

Species of moth

Gelechia capiteochrella is a moth of the family Gelechiidae. It is found in North America, where it has been recorded from Texas.

The forewings are dark brown, with the extreme tip of the thorax, and a few minute spots on the forewings ochreous. One of these spots is on the fold towards the base, three or four others at about the middle of the wing, and there are two other minute ones in the apical part of the wing.
