= Gelechia ocherfuscella =

Scientific classification
- Kingdom: Animalia
- Phylum: Arthropoda
- Clade: Pancrustacea
- Class: Insecta
- Order: Lepidoptera
- Family: Gelechiidae
- Genus: Gelechia
- Species: G. ocherfuscella

Binomial name
- Gelechia ocherfuscella Chambers, 1875

Synonyms
- Gelechia ochreofuscella Meyrick, 1925

Species of moth

Gelechia ocherfuscella is a moth of the family Gelechiidae. It is found in North America, where it has been recorded from California.

The forewings are brownish-ocherous, with the disc just before the middle, and the costal margin about the middle distinctly suffused with fuscus, and that is the prevailing hue of the special part of the wing. The cilia are ocherous, with a dark brown hinder marginal line at their base, and two similar, but not distinct, lines about their middle.
