= Gelechia badiomaculella =

Scientific classification
- Kingdom: Animalia
- Phylum: Arthropoda
- Clade: Pancrustacea
- Class: Insecta
- Order: Lepidoptera
- Family: Gelechiidae
- Genus: Gelechia
- Species: G. badiomaculella

Binomial name
- Gelechia badiomaculella Chambers, 1872

Species of moth

Gelechia badiomaculella is a moth of the family Gelechiidae. It is found in North America, where it has been recorded from Kentucky.

The forewings are dark brown, with a short distinct ochreous-yellow oblique costal streak about the basal quarter, pointing towards a small ochreous-yellow raised tuft just within the middle of the dorsal margin. Between this tuft and the costa, but nearest to the costa, is an indistinct ochreous-yellow patch and on the disc are two minute ochreous yellow tufts. An ochreous-yellow streak is found at the base of the costal cilia, and another opposite it at the base of the dorsal cilias, nearly meeting in the middle of the wing. A row of minute ochreous-yellow tufts is found around the apex at the base. The tufts and spots are all pale ochreous yellow.
