= List of gelechiid genera: Q =

The large moth family Gelechiidae contains the following genera:

- Qeseis
