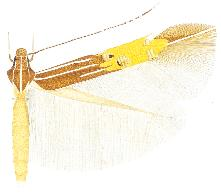

Scientific classification
- Kingdom: Animalia
- Phylum: Arthropoda
- Clade: Pancrustacea
- Class: Insecta
- Order: Lepidoptera
- Family: Cosmopterigidae
- Genus: Cosmopterix
- Species: C. quadrilineella

Binomial name
- Cosmopterix quadrilineella Chambers, 1878

= Cosmopterix quadrilineella =

Species of moth

Cosmopterix quadrilineella is a moth of the family Cosmopterigidae. It is known from the United States (Texas, Arizona, Arkansas and California).

Adults have been recorded from May to October.

== Description ==
Male, female. Forewing length 4.2 mm. Head: frons shining ochreous-white with greenish and reddish reflections, vertex and neck tufts shining bronze brown with reddish reflection, laterally and medially lined white, collar shining bronze brown; labial palpus first segment very short, white, second segment three-quarters of the length of third, greyish brown with white longitudinal lines laterally and ventrally, third segment white, lined dark brown laterally; scape dorsally shining dark brown with white anterior and dorsal lines, ventrally shining white, antenna shining dark brown with a white line from base to before one-half, followed towards apex by an annulate section of about fourteen segments, two white, two dark brown, two white, two dark brown, two white, six dark brown and eight white segments at apex. Thorax and tegulae shining bronze brown with reddish gloss, thorax with a white median line, tegulae lined white inwardly. Legs: shining greyish brown, femora of midleg and hindleg pale ochreous, foreleg with a white line on tibia and tarsal segments, tibia of midleg with white oblique basal, medial and subapical streaks, tarsal segments lined white dorsally, tibia of hindleg with a white lateral line on outside to one-half, from there bending dorsally to two-thirds, and with a white apical ring, tarsal segments as midleg, spurs white, ventrally greyish. Forewing shining bronze brown with reddish gloss, five white lines in the basal area, a very short costal just before the transverse fascia, a subcostal from base almost to the transverse fascia, bending slightly from costa in distal third, a medial above fold from base to the transverse fascia, a subdorsal from two-fifths to the transverse fascia, a narrow dorsal from beyond base almost to the transverse fascia, a yellow transverse fascia beyond the middle with a wide apical protrusion, bordered at the inner edge by a tubercular pale golden metallic subcostal spot and with a patch of blackish brown scales on the outside, a similar, but twice as large, subdorsal spot at one-quarter of the transverse fascia, inwardly edged blackish brown, bordered at the outer edge by two tubercular pale golden metallic costal and dorsal spots, opposite each other, the dorsal spot twice as large as the costal, a broad white costal streak from the outer costal spot, a shining white apical line connected to the apical protrusion, cilia greyish brown at apex, pale ochreous towards dorsum. Hindwing shining greyish white, darker at costa and dorsum, cilia pale ochreous. Underside: forewing shining pale greyish brown, the white apical line distinctly visible, hindwing shining pale grey. Abdomen dorsally pale brownish yellow, ventrally shining white, anal tuft white.
