= Gelechia griseella =

Scientific classification
- Kingdom: Animalia
- Phylum: Arthropoda
- Clade: Pancrustacea
- Class: Insecta
- Order: Lepidoptera
- Family: Gelechiidae
- Genus: Gelechia
- Species: G. griseella

Binomial name
- Gelechia griseella (Chambers, 1874)

Synonyms
- Nothris griseella Chambers, 1874; Trichotaphe griseella; Dichomeris griseella

Species of moth

Gelechia griseella is a moth of the family Gelechiidae. It is found in North America, where it has been recorded from Texas.

Adults are pale grey, the extreme costa at the base, and the inner angle of the forewings dark brown, and the base towards the dorsal margin suffused with faint reddish yellow. The disc from the base nearly to the middle is suffused with brown, and there are faint brownish streaks between the veins in the apical part of the wing.
