= Gelechia pallidagriseella =

Scientific classification
- Kingdom: Animalia
- Phylum: Arthropoda
- Clade: Pancrustacea
- Class: Insecta
- Order: Lepidoptera
- Family: Gelechiidae
- Genus: Gelechia
- Species: G. pallidagriseella

Binomial name
- Gelechia pallidagriseella Chambers, 1874

Synonyms
- Gelechia pallidegrisseella Chambers, 1875

Species of moth

Gelechia pallidagriseella is a moth of the family Gelechiidae. It is found in North America, where it has been recorded from Texas.

Adults are pale yellowish grey, a little suffused with ochreous on the thorax and forewings. There is a minute rust red spot about the middle of the disc and the extreme costa is dark brown at the base.
