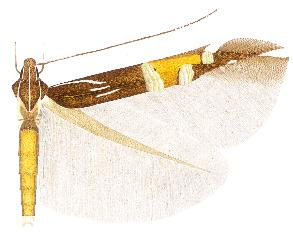

Scientific classification
- Kingdom: Animalia
- Phylum: Arthropoda
- Clade: Pancrustacea
- Class: Insecta
- Order: Lepidoptera
- Family: Cosmopterigidae
- Genus: Cosmopterix
- Species: C. montisella

Binomial name
- Cosmopterix montisella Chambers, 1875

Synonyms
- Cosmopteryx unicolorella Walsingham, 1889; Cosmopterix unicolorella

= Cosmopterix montisella =

Species of moth

Cosmopterix montisella is a moth of the family Cosmopterigidae. It is known from the United States, where it is found from New York and Oregon south to New Mexico, Arizona and California. Single specimens have been collected in Arkansas and Iowa. The species is now also established in Michigan.

== Description ==
Male, female. Forewing length 5.1-6.5 mm. Head: frons shining pale ochreous with greenish and reddish reflections, vertex and neck tufts shining dark bronze brown with greenish and reddish gloss, laterally and medially edged white, collar shining dark bronze brown; labial palpus first segment very short, shining ochreous, second segment four-fifths of the length of third, dark brown with white longitudinal lines laterally and ventrally, third segment white, lined dark brown laterally; scape dorsally shining dark brown with a white anterior line, shining white ventrally, antenna shining dark brown, a short white line from base with an interrupted subdistal section of three to four segments, this white line varies in length, followed towards apex by three dark brown, one white, approximately ten dark brown, three white, four dark brown and two white segments at apex. Thorax and tegulae shining dark bronze brown with greenish and reddish gloss, thorax with a white median line, tegulae lined white inwardly. Legs: shining dark brown with reddish gloss, femur of foreleg shining grey, femora of midleg and hindleg shining pale golden, foreleg with a white line on tibia and tarsal segments one and two, tibia of midleg with white oblique basal and medial lines and a white apical ring, tarsal segments one and two with white apical rings, tibia of hindleg as midleg, tarsal segments one and two with whitish apical rings, spurs white dorsally, dark brown ventrally. Forewing shining dark bronze brown with reddish golden gloss, four white streaks in the basal area, a subcostal from base to one-quarter, strongly bending from costa and widening in distal third, a short medial, ending at or slightly beyond the subcostal, a subdorsal as long or slightly longer than the medial and slightly further from base than the medial, a narrow dorsal from beyond base to one-seventh, there is some variation in the length and shape of the white streaks, a broad orange-brown transverse fascia beyond the middle, at costa twice as wide as at dorsum, the dorsal part darkened or completely brown, bordered at the inner edge by a broad tubercular silver or pale golden metallic fascia, widening towards dorsum, bordered at the outer edge by two tubercular silver or pale golden metallic costal and dorsal spots the dorsal spot about twice as large as the costal and much closer to base, both tubercular fascia and spots with greenish and purplish reflections, and the fascia sometimes with a tiny dark brown subcostal spot on the outside, costal and dorsal spots inwardly edged dark brown, a broad white costal streak from the costal spot, a pale golden to golden metallic apical line on dorsum of the apical area, often broadly interrupted in the middle and becoming a broad shining white streak in the apical cilia; cilia dark bronze brown around apex, ochreous-brown on dorsum towards base. Hindwing shining brownish-grey, cilia ochreous-brown. Underside: forewing shining greyish brown with the white costal streak, the white line in the apical cilia and an ochreous line on dorsum distinctly visible, hindwing shining greyish brown. Abdomen dorsally shining brownish yellow, laterally and ventrally shining dark grey, segments broadly banded shining white posteriorly, anal tuft ochreous-white dorsally, mixed brown ventrally.

== Biology ==
It is univoltine throughout much of the range with adults on wing from early June to mid-September. It is bivoltine in southern Arizona with adults on wing in July, August and late September.
