= Gelechia ribesella =

Scientific classification
- Kingdom: Animalia
- Phylum: Arthropoda
- Clade: Pancrustacea
- Class: Insecta
- Order: Lepidoptera
- Family: Gelechiidae
- Genus: Gelechia
- Species: G. ribesella

Binomial name
- Gelechia ribesella Chambers, 1875

Species of moth

Gelechia ribesella is a moth of the family Gelechiidae. It was described by Vactor Tousey Chambers in 1875. It is found in North America, where it has been recorded from Mexico, California, Colorado, Oregon and British Columbia.

The forewings are rich brown, a little dusted with white and pale roseate along the costal margin and with a white spot on the disc, margined both before and behind by a spot of darker brown than the general hue, there is another smaller white spot nearer to the base, and a white fascia before the cilia, widest on the dorsal margin. The cilia of the forewings are bright roseate, in some lights almost brick red, and somewhat dusted with brown. Behind the fascia, the wing is darker than it is before it, except upon the disc before and behind the white spot.
