= Gelechia rileyella =

Scientific classification
- Kingdom: Animalia
- Phylum: Arthropoda
- Clade: Pancrustacea
- Class: Insecta
- Order: Lepidoptera
- Family: Gelechiidae
- Genus: Gelechia
- Species: G. rileyella

Binomial name
- Gelechia rileyella (Chambers, 1872)

Synonyms
- Depressaria rileyella Chambers, 1872

Species of moth

Gelechia rileyella is a moth of the family Gelechiidae. It was described by Vactor Tousey Chambers in 1872. It is found in North America, where it has been recorded from Kentucky, Maine and New Hampshire.

The forewings are pale yellow, faintly tinged with pink and minutely dusted with fuscous. There is a fuscous streak on the base of the costa. The hindwings are a little paler.
