= Gelechia bistrigella =

Scientific classification
- Kingdom: Animalia
- Phylum: Arthropoda
- Clade: Pancrustacea
- Class: Insecta
- Order: Lepidoptera
- Family: Gelechiidae
- Genus: Gelechia
- Species: G. bistrigella

Binomial name
- Gelechia bistrigella (Chambers, 1872)

Synonyms
- Depressaria bistrigella Chambers, 1872

Species of moth

Gelechia bistrigella is a moth of the family Gelechiidae. It is found in North America, where it has been recorded from Ontario.

The forewings are dark brown, a little bronzed and with a little ochreous intermixed, especially in two small patches, one of which is just before the middle and the other about the middle of the wing. There is a small whitish costal streak at the beginning of the costal cilia and another at the beginning of the dorsal cilia. The hindwings are pale ochreous with a silvery lustre.
