= Gelechia melanoptila =

Scientific classification
- Kingdom: Animalia
- Phylum: Arthropoda
- Clade: Pancrustacea
- Class: Insecta
- Order: Lepidoptera
- Family: Gelechiidae
- Genus: Gelechia
- Species: G. melanoptila

Binomial name
- Gelechia melanoptila (Lower, 1897)

Synonyms
- Psoricoptera melanoptila Lower, 1897

Species of moth

Gelechia melanoptila is a moth of the family Gelechiidae. It is found in Australia, where it has been recorded from New South Wales.

The wingspan is about 10 mm. The forewings are whitish tinged with ashy-grey, and with some ferruginous scales. There are three black tufts of scales, the first in the disc about the middle, the second just below, and the third on the anal angle, the latter one edged more or less with ferruginous. There is an obscure blackish streak at the base, obscurely continued along the costa to the next fascia and there is a moderate irregular obscure blackish fascia from the costa at one-fourth to the first two tufts. A suffused blackish elongate mark is found along the costa at about three-fourths, followed by an obscure blackish row of dots, which are continued around the hindmargin to the anal angle. The hindwings are grey.
