= Gelechia hyoscyamella =

Scientific classification
- Kingdom: Animalia
- Phylum: Arthropoda
- Clade: Pancrustacea
- Class: Insecta
- Order: Lepidoptera
- Family: Gelechiidae
- Genus: Gelechia
- Species: G. hyoscyamella

Binomial name
- Gelechia hyoscyamella (Rebel, 1912)

Synonyms
- Teleia hyoscyamella Rebel, 1912

Species of moth

Gelechia hyoscyamella is a moth of the family Gelechiidae. It is found in Egypt.

The wingspan is 11–12 mm. The forewings are ochreous-yellow, sprinkled with brownish and with brownish ill-defined streaks. The hindwings are grey, with ochreous-yellow margins.
