= Gelechia angustella =

Scientific classification
- Kingdom: Animalia
- Phylum: Arthropoda
- Clade: Pancrustacea
- Class: Insecta
- Order: Lepidoptera
- Family: Gelechiidae
- Genus: Gelechia
- Species: G. angustella

Binomial name
- Gelechia angustella Walker, 1864

Species of moth

Gelechia angustella is a moth of the family Gelechiidae. It is found in Sri Lanka.

Adults are whitish, smooth and shining, the forewings with some aeneous streaks, two of which are larger than the others. Of these, one extends obliquely outward from the exterior costa, and the other is along the apical part of the costa. The exterior border is extremely oblique.
