= Gelechia invenustella =

Scientific classification
- Kingdom: Animalia
- Phylum: Arthropoda
- Clade: Pancrustacea
- Class: Insecta
- Order: Lepidoptera
- Family: Gelechiidae
- Genus: Gelechia
- Species: G. invenustella

Binomial name
- Gelechia invenustella Berg, 1876

Species of moth

Gelechia invenustella is a moth of the family Gelechiidae. It is found in Argentina.

The wingspan is about 19 mm. The forewings are ash-grey with two ill-defined black dots in the middle of the cell and some dark streaks. The hindwings are brownish grey.
