= Gelechia anthracopa =

Scientific classification
- Kingdom: Animalia
- Phylum: Arthropoda
- Clade: Pancrustacea
- Class: Insecta
- Order: Lepidoptera
- Family: Gelechiidae
- Genus: Gelechia
- Species: G. anthracopa

Binomial name
- Gelechia anthracopa Meyrick, 1922

Species of moth

Gelechia anthracopa is a moth of the family Gelechiidae. It is found in China (Shanghai).

The wingspan is 12–13 mm. The forewings are whitish, irregularly sprinkled grey and dark grey with small blackish spots on the base of the costa and dorsum. There is a black dot above the fold at one-fifth. The stigmata form black spots, the plical beneath the first discal, the second discal transverse. There is a pre-marginal series of large blackish dots around the posterior half of the costa and termen to before the tornus. The hindwings are light grey, towards the base paler or whitish.
