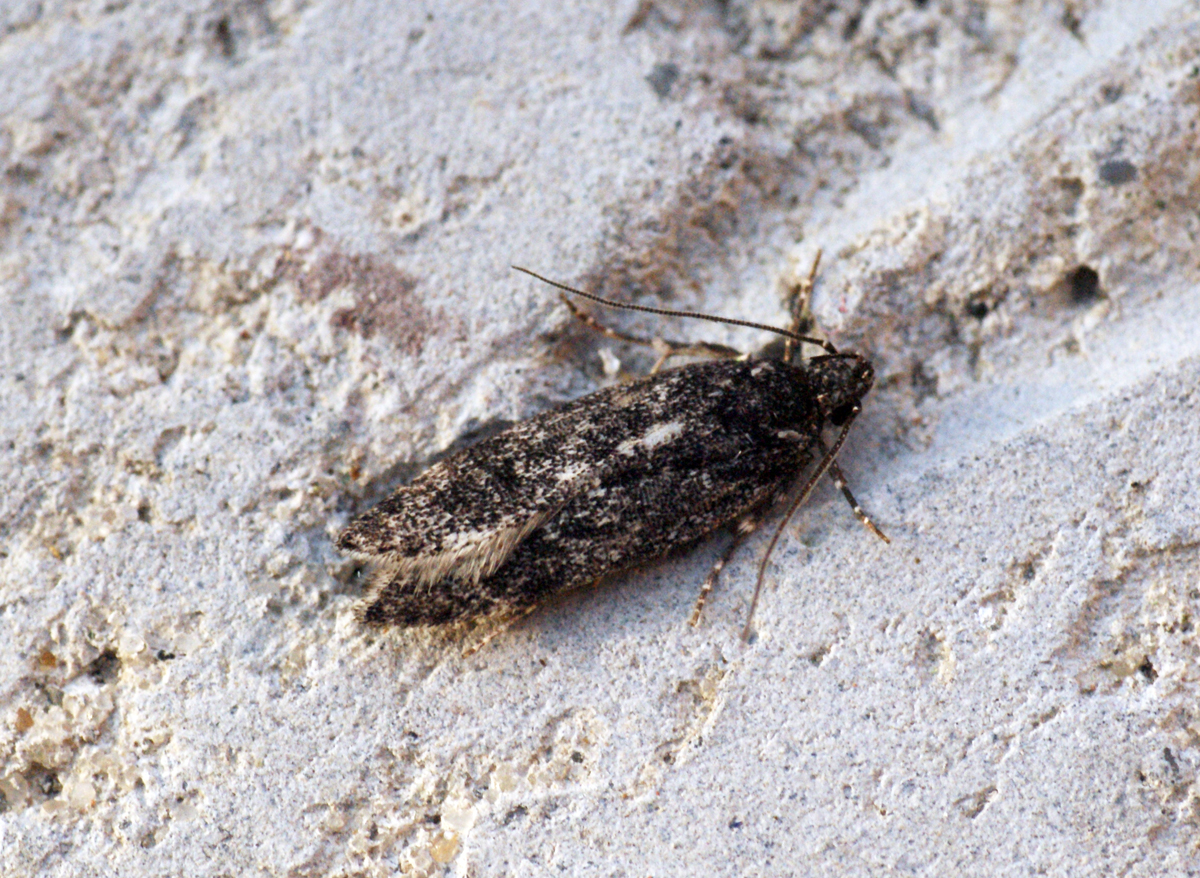
- Gelechia nigra

Scientific classification
- Kingdom: Animalia
- Phylum: Arthropoda
- Clade: Pancrustacea
- Class: Insecta
- Order: Lepidoptera
- Family: Gelechiidae
- Genus: Gelechia
- Species: G. nigra

Binomial name
- Gelechia nigra (Haworth, 1828)

Synonyms
- Recurvaria nigra Haworth, 1828; Gelechia cautella Zeller, 1839

= Gelechia nigra =

Species of moth

Gelechia nigra, the black groundling, is a moth of the family Gelechiidae. It was described by Adrian Hardy Haworth in 1828. It is found in most of Europe, except Ireland, the Iberian Peninsula and most of the Balkan Peninsula. The habitat consists of woodlands and river banks.

The wingspan is 16–20 mm. Adult are on wing from June to July.

The larvae feed on Populus tremula, Populus alba and Populus canescens, as well as on Salix species.
