= Gelechia atrofusca =

Scientific classification
- Kingdom: Animalia
- Phylum: Arthropoda
- Clade: Pancrustacea
- Class: Insecta
- Order: Lepidoptera
- Family: Gelechiidae
- Genus: Gelechia
- Species: G. atrofusca

Binomial name
- Gelechia atrofusca Omelko, 1986

Species of moth

Gelechia atrofusca is a species of moth in the family Gelechiidae. It is found in Russia.

The Latin specific epithet atrofusca means "dark brown".
