= Gelechia arotrias =

Scientific classification
- Kingdom: Animalia
- Phylum: Arthropoda
- Clade: Pancrustacea
- Class: Insecta
- Order: Lepidoptera
- Family: Gelechiidae
- Genus: Gelechia
- Species: G. arotrias

Binomial name
- Gelechia arotrias Meyrick, 1908

Species of moth

Gelechia arotrias is a moth of the family Gelechiidae. It is found in South Africa, where it has been recorded from KwaZulu-Natal.

The wingspan is about 21 mm. The forewings are dark purplish-fuscous, lighter and crimson-tinged towards the base of the costa, darkest above the dorsal stripe. There is a pale ochreous-yellowish dorsal stripe from the base to near the tornus, rather broad towards the middle but narrowed to the extremities, before the posterior extremity emitting an oblique bar to two-thirds of the disc. The hindwings are rather light fuscous, somewhat darker posteriorly.
