= Gelechia jakovlevi =

Scientific classification
- Kingdom: Animalia
- Phylum: Arthropoda
- Clade: Pancrustacea
- Class: Insecta
- Order: Lepidoptera
- Family: Gelechiidae
- Genus: Gelechia
- Species: G. jakovlevi

Binomial name
- Gelechia jakovlevi Krulikovsky, 1905

Synonyms
- Gelechia nigrovittata Schantz, 1971; Gelechia mongoliae Emelyanov & Piskunov, 1982

Species of moth

Gelechia jakovlevi is a moth of the family Gelechiidae. It is found in Finland, the Baltic region, Ukraine, the European part of Russia, Siberia and Mongolia.

The larvae feed on Ribes species.
