= Gelechia overhaldensis =

Scientific classification
- Kingdom: Animalia
- Phylum: Arthropoda
- Clade: Pancrustacea
- Class: Insecta
- Order: Lepidoptera
- Family: Gelechiidae
- Genus: Gelechia
- Species: G. overhaldensis

Binomial name
- Gelechia overhaldensis Strand, 1920

Species of moth

Gelechia overhaldensis is a moth of the family Gelechiidae. It was described by Strand in 1920. It is found in Norway.
