= Gelechia anomorcta =

Scientific classification
- Kingdom: Animalia
- Phylum: Arthropoda
- Clade: Pancrustacea
- Class: Insecta
- Order: Lepidoptera
- Family: Gelechiidae
- Genus: Gelechia
- Species: G. anomorcta

Binomial name
- Gelechia anomorcta Meyrick, 1926

Species of moth

Gelechia anomorcta is a moth of the family Gelechiidae. It is found in the Russian Far East and Japan.

The wingspan is 15–16 mm. The forewings are greyish-ochreous or pale fuscous, more or less generally mixed or suffused rather dark fuscous and with a spot of dark fuscous suffusion on base of the costa. The stigmata form irregular or roundish suffused dark fuscous spots, the plical smallest, obliquely before the first discal, the discal rather large, sometimes pale suffusion between these. There is a cloudy usually indistinct pale ochreous spot on the costa at three-fourths, preceded by a blotch of dark fuscous suffusion, a moderate transverse fascia of dark suffusion from this more or less distinctly indicated. A marginal series of cloudy dark fuscous dots is found around the posterior part of the costa and termen. The hindwings are grey, paler towards the base.
