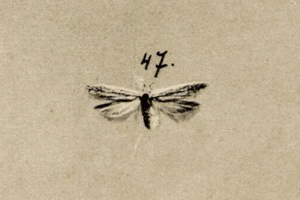

Scientific classification
- Kingdom: Animalia
- Phylum: Arthropoda
- Clade: Pancrustacea
- Class: Insecta
- Order: Lepidoptera
- Family: Gelechiidae
- Genus: Gelechia
- Species: G. nervosella

Binomial name
- Gelechia nervosella (Zerny, 1927)

Synonyms
- Nothris nervosella Zerny, 1927; Nothris thuriferella Cleu, 1936

= Gelechia nervosella =

Species of moth

Gelechia nervosella is a moth of the family Gelechiidae. It is found in southern France, Spain and Morocco.
