= Gelechia ochrocorys =

Scientific classification
- Kingdom: Animalia
- Phylum: Arthropoda
- Clade: Pancrustacea
- Class: Insecta
- Order: Lepidoptera
- Family: Gelechiidae
- Genus: Gelechia
- Species: G. ochrocorys

Binomial name
- Gelechia ochrocorys Meyrick, 1936

Species of moth

Gelechia ochrocorys is a moth of the family Gelechiidae. It is found in the Democratic Republic of Congo (Katanga).
