= Gelechia leptospora =

Scientific classification
- Kingdom: Animalia
- Phylum: Arthropoda
- Clade: Pancrustacea
- Class: Insecta
- Order: Lepidoptera
- Family: Gelechiidae
- Genus: Gelechia
- Species: G. leptospora

Binomial name
- Gelechia leptospora Meyrick, 1932

Species of moth

Gelechia leptospora is a moth of the family Gelechiidae. It is found in Costa Rica.
