= Gelechia atlanticella =

Scientific classification
- Kingdom: Animalia
- Phylum: Arthropoda
- Clade: Pancrustacea
- Class: Insecta
- Order: Lepidoptera
- Family: Gelechiidae
- Genus: Gelechia
- Species: G. atlanticella

Binomial name
- Gelechia atlanticella (Amsel, 1955)

Synonyms
- Nothris atlanticella Amsel, 1955

Species of moth

Gelechia atlanticella is a moth of the family Gelechiidae. It is found in Morocco and Spain.
