= Gelechia praestantella =

Scientific classification
- Kingdom: Animalia
- Phylum: Arthropoda
- Clade: Pancrustacea
- Class: Insecta
- Order: Lepidoptera
- Family: Gelechiidae
- Genus: Gelechia
- Species: G. praestantella

Binomial name
- Gelechia praestantella D. Lucas, 1956

Species of moth

Gelechia praestantella is a moth of the family Gelechiidae. It was described by Daniel Lucas in 1956. It is found in Morocco.
