= Gelechia desiliens =

Scientific classification
- Kingdom: Animalia
- Phylum: Arthropoda
- Clade: Pancrustacea
- Class: Insecta
- Order: Lepidoptera
- Family: Gelechiidae
- Genus: Gelechia
- Species: G. desiliens

Binomial name
- Gelechia desiliens Walsingham, 1911

Species of moth

Gelechia desiliens is a moth of the family Gelechiidae. It is found in North America, where it has been recorded from California.

The wingspan is 19–22 mm. The forewings are light brownish with faint rosy tinge, irregularly mixed fuscous or dark grey and with a few whitish scales. The ccsta is more or less suffused dark fuscous towards the base. The stigmata are rather large, cloudy, dark fuscous or blackish, sometimes with adjacent lateral whitish scales, the plical slightly before the first discal, sometimes elongate. There is a whitish rather outwards-oblique line from three-fourths of the costa to the tornus, sinuate outwards in the middle and there are sometimes three or four small whitish marginal dots around the apex. The hindwings are whitish-grey, more whitish and thinly scaled anteriorly, the veins and termen suffused rather dark grey.
