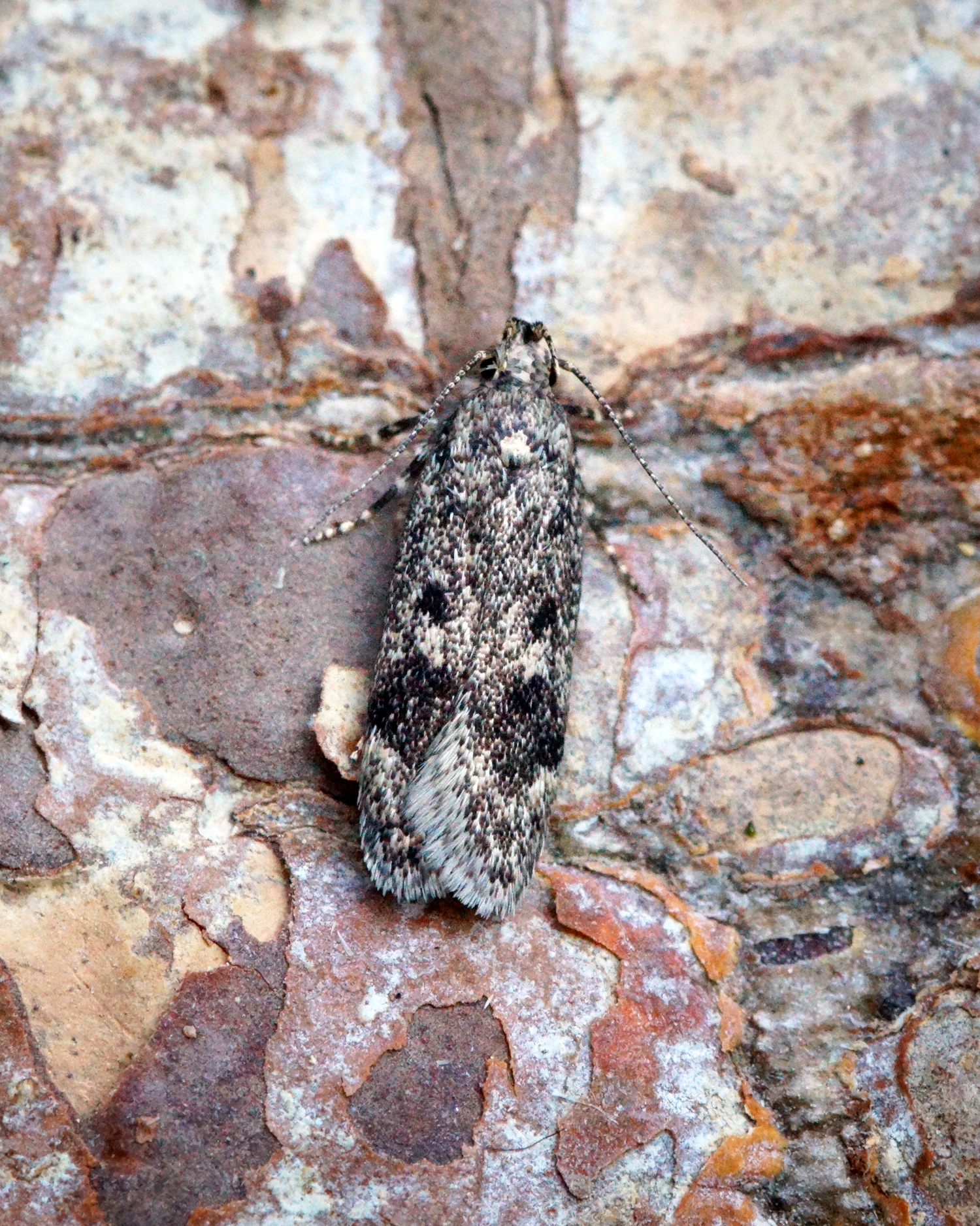

Scientific classification
- Kingdom: Animalia
- Phylum: Arthropoda
- Clade: Pancrustacea
- Class: Insecta
- Order: Lepidoptera
- Family: Gelechiidae
- Genus: Gelechia
- Species: G. scotinella

Binomial name
- Gelechia scotinella Herrich-Schäffer, 1854

Synonyms
- Gelechia confusella Heinemann, 1870; Gelechia consprucatella Heinemann, 1870; Gelechia kiesenwetteri Heuacker, 1873; Lita baueri Rebel, 1917; Gelechia (Lita) lakatensis Rebel, 1904

= Gelechia scotinella =

Species of moth

Gelechia scotinella, the thicket groundling, is a moth of the family Gelechiidae. It was described by Gottlieb August Wilhelm Herrich-Schäffer in 1854 and is found in almost all of Europe. The habitat consists of mature hedgerows and scrubland.
