= Gelechia monella =

Scientific classification
- Kingdom: Animalia
- Phylum: Arthropoda
- Clade: Pancrustacea
- Class: Insecta
- Order: Lepidoptera
- Family: Gelechiidae
- Genus: Gelechia
- Species: G. monella

Binomial name
- Gelechia monella Busck, 1904

Species of moth

Gelechia monella is a moth of the family Gelechiidae. It is found in North America, where it has been recorded from British Columbia, Oregon, Wyoming and California.

The wingspan is about 18 mm. The forewings are light fuscous irregularly mottled with black, white, and grey scales. The costal edge is somewhat lighter than the rest of the wing. In the center of the wing is a row of three more or less pronounced longitudinal blackish streaks, one beginning at the base of the wing, the next on the outer part of the cell, and the third at the end of and outside the cell. These dark streaks are, however, not very constant, and in some specimens only the middle one is at all prominent. Around the apical edge is a row of ill-defined dark spots, with the intervals bluish white, and the entire insect has a faint violet or roseate tinge. The hindwings are light fuscous.
