= Gelechia aspoecki =

Scientific classification
- Kingdom: Animalia
- Phylum: Arthropoda
- Clade: Pancrustacea
- Class: Insecta
- Order: Lepidoptera
- Family: Gelechiidae
- Genus: Gelechia
- Species: G. aspoecki

Binomial name
- Gelechia aspoecki Huemer, 1992

Species of moth

Gelechia aspoecki is a moth of the family Gelechiidae. It is found in southern France.
