= Gelechia fecunda =

Scientific classification
- Kingdom: Animalia
- Phylum: Arthropoda
- Clade: Pancrustacea
- Class: Insecta
- Order: Lepidoptera
- Family: Gelechiidae
- Genus: Gelechia
- Species: G. fecunda

Binomial name
- Gelechia fecunda Meyrick, 1918

Synonyms
- Telphusa fecunda

Species of moth

Gelechia fecunda is a moth of the family Gelechiidae first described by Edward Meyrick in 1918. It is found in South Africa.

The wingspan is about 9 mm. The forewings are yellow ochreous and the costa finely dotted with black from the base to a triangular cloudy blackish spot at two-thirds, a triangular spot of blackish-grey irroration (sprinkles) on the dorsum before the tornus, slightly before the costal spot. There is a small black dot representing the plical stigma. There are some scattered blackish scales towards the apex, and several undefined marginal dots of blackish irroration around the apex and termen. The hindwings are rather dark grey.
