= Gelechia mandella =

Scientific classification
- Kingdom: Animalia
- Phylum: Arthropoda
- Clade: Pancrustacea
- Class: Insecta
- Order: Lepidoptera
- Family: Gelechiidae
- Genus: Gelechia
- Species: G. mandella

Binomial name
- Gelechia mandella Busck, 1904

Species of moth

Gelechia mandella is a moth of the family Gelechiidae. It is found in North America, where it has been recorded from British Columbia and California.

The wingspan is 17–18 mm. The forewings are dark purplish fuscous sprinkled with black and white scales. There are two indistinct black discal spots, one shortly before and the other at the end of the cell. A very faint, thin, outwardly sharply angulated white fascia crosses the wing at the apical third, and there are a few white scales before the apex. The entire edge of the wing, but more especially the apical part, is suffused with light rose-coloured scales. The hindwings are dark fuscous.
