= Gelechia platydoxa =

Scientific classification
- Kingdom: Animalia
- Phylum: Arthropoda
- Clade: Pancrustacea
- Class: Insecta
- Order: Lepidoptera
- Family: Gelechiidae
- Genus: Gelechia
- Species: G. platydoxa

Binomial name
- Gelechia platydoxa Meyrick, 1923

Species of moth

Gelechia platydoxa is a moth of the family Gelechiidae. It was described by Edward Meyrick in 1923. It is found in Guyana.
