= Gelechia delodectis =

Scientific classification
- Kingdom: Animalia
- Phylum: Arthropoda
- Clade: Pancrustacea
- Class: Insecta
- Order: Lepidoptera
- Family: Gelechiidae
- Genus: Gelechia
- Species: G. delodectis

Binomial name
- Gelechia delodectis Meyrick, 1938

Species of moth

Gelechia delodectis is a moth of the family Gelechiidae. It is found in China (Yunnan).
