= Gelechia conditor =

Scientific classification
- Kingdom: Animalia
- Phylum: Arthropoda
- Clade: Pancrustacea
- Class: Insecta
- Order: Lepidoptera
- Family: Gelechiidae
- Genus: Gelechia
- Species: G. conditor

Binomial name
- Gelechia conditor Omelko, 1986

Species of moth

Gelechia conditor is a species of Lepidoptera in the family twirler moth also of the family Gelechiidae. It is found in Russia and Korea.
