= Gelechia benitella =

Scientific classification
- Kingdom: Animalia
- Phylum: Arthropoda
- Clade: Pancrustacea
- Class: Insecta
- Order: Lepidoptera
- Family: Gelechiidae
- Genus: Gelechia
- Species: G. benitella

Binomial name
- Gelechia benitella Barnes & Busck, 1920

Species of moth

Gelechia benitella is a moth of the family Gelechiidae described by William Barnes and August Busck in 1920. It is found in North America, where it has been recorded from Texas.

The wingspan is 12–13 mm. The forewings are dark purplish brown with a light yellow streak from the basal fifth of the costa curving downwards and outwards along the fold and then upwards, ending at the end of the cell. It is partially edged with black scales and there is a light yellow triangular costal spot at the apical fourth. The hindwings are light fuscous.
