= Gelechia chionomima =

Scientific classification
- Kingdom: Animalia
- Phylum: Arthropoda
- Clade: Pancrustacea
- Class: Insecta
- Order: Lepidoptera
- Family: Gelechiidae
- Genus: Gelechia
- Species: G. chionomima

Binomial name
- Gelechia chionomima Meyrick, 1929

Species of moth

Gelechia chionomima is a moth of the family Gelechiidae. It is found in South Africa.
