= Gelechia tetraleuca =

Scientific classification
- Kingdom: Animalia
- Phylum: Arthropoda
- Clade: Pancrustacea
- Class: Insecta
- Order: Lepidoptera
- Family: Gelechiidae
- Genus: Gelechia
- Species: G. tetraleuca

Binomial name
- Gelechia tetraleuca Meyrick, 1918

Species of moth

Gelechia tetraleuca is a moth of the family Gelechiidae first described by Edward Meyrick in 1918. It is found in South Africa.

The wingspan is about 15 mm. The forewings are grey much suffused with black, especially through the middle of the disc, and towards the dorsum near the base. There are four white blotches, the first elongate, extending along the dorsum from one-fourth to three-fourths, widest anteriorly and reaching halfway across the wing, then irregularly attenuated, the second oval, beneath the costa slightly beyond the middle, third roundish, on the tornus, fourth semi oval, on the costa towards the apex. There is a slender irregular white streak along the termen. The hindwings are whitish grey.
