= Gelechia rescissella =

Scientific classification
- Kingdom: Animalia
- Phylum: Arthropoda
- Clade: Pancrustacea
- Class: Insecta
- Order: Lepidoptera
- Family: Gelechiidae
- Genus: Gelechia
- Species: G. rescissella

Binomial name
- Gelechia rescissella Zeller, 1852

Synonyms
- Schizovalva rescissella

Species of moth

Gelechia rescissella is a moth of the family Gelechiidae. It was described by Philipp Christoph Zeller in 1852. It is found in South Africa.
