= Gelechia exclarella =

Scientific classification
- Kingdom: Animalia
- Phylum: Arthropoda
- Clade: Pancrustacea
- Class: Insecta
- Order: Lepidoptera
- Family: Gelechiidae
- Genus: Gelechia
- Species: G. exclarella

Binomial name
- Gelechia exclarella Möschler, 1890

Species of moth

Gelechia exclarella is a moth of the family Gelechiidae. It is found in Puerto Rico.
