= Gelechia caudatae =

Scientific classification
- Kingdom: Animalia
- Phylum: Arthropoda
- Clade: Pancrustacea
- Class: Insecta
- Order: Lepidoptera
- Family: Gelechiidae
- Genus: Gelechia
- Species: G. caudatae

Binomial name
- Gelechia caudatae Clarke, 1934

Species of moth

Gelechia caudatae is a moth of the family Gelechiidae. It is found in North America, where it has been recorded from Washington.

The larvae feed on Salix caudata.
