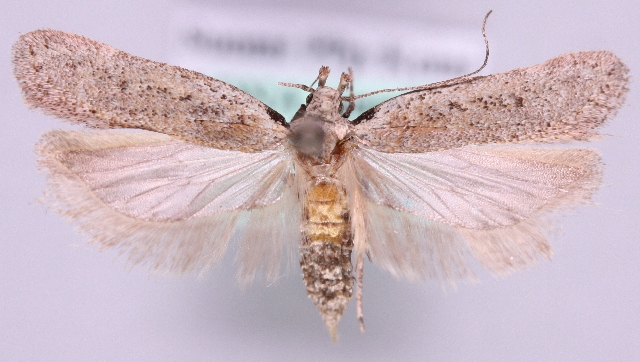

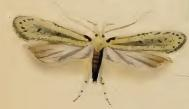

Scientific classification
- Kingdom: Animalia
- Phylum: Arthropoda
- Clade: Pancrustacea
- Class: Insecta
- Order: Lepidoptera
- Family: Gelechiidae
- Genus: Gelechia
- Species: G. hippophaella

Binomial name
- Gelechia hippophaella (Schrank, 1802)

Synonyms
- Tinea hippophaella Schrank, 1802; Gelechia basalis Stainton, 1854; Gelechia acupediella Frey, 1870

= Gelechia hippophaella =

Species of moth

The sea buckthorn moth (Gelechia hippophaella) is a moth of the family Gelechiidae. It is found from Fennoscandia to the Pyrenees, Italy and Romania and from Great Britain to Ukraine.

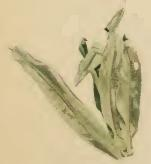
A shoot of Hippophae rhamnoides eaten by larva

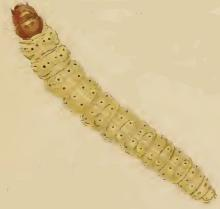
Larva
