= Gelechia gracula =

Scientific classification
- Kingdom: Animalia
- Phylum: Arthropoda
- Clade: Pancrustacea
- Class: Insecta
- Order: Lepidoptera
- Family: Gelechiidae
- Genus: Gelechia
- Species: G. gracula

Binomial name
- Gelechia gracula (Meyrick, 1929)

Synonyms
- Nothris gracula Meyrick, 1929; Nothris diaconalis Meyrick, 1929

Species of moth

Gelechia gracula is a moth of the family Gelechiidae. It is found in North America, where it has been recorded from Texas.
