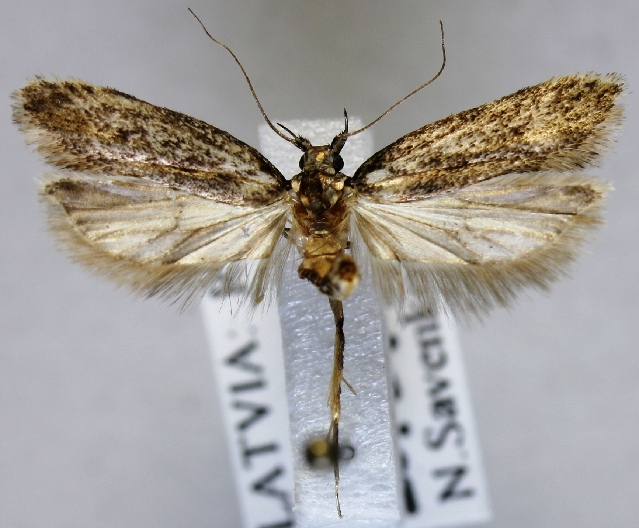

Scientific classification
- Kingdom: Animalia
- Phylum: Arthropoda
- Clade: Pancrustacea
- Class: Insecta
- Order: Lepidoptera
- Family: Gelechiidae
- Genus: Gelechia
- Species: G. rhombelliformis

Binomial name
- Gelechia rhombelliformis Staudinger, 1871

= Gelechia rhombelliformis =

Species of moth

Gelechia rhombelliformis is a moth of the family Gelechiidae. It was described by Otto Staudinger in 1871. It is found from the Netherlands and Germany east to Russia and from Denmark and Latvia south to Austria, Hungary and Romania.

The wingspan is 15–19 mm.
