= Gelechia aglossella =

Scientific classification
- Kingdom: Animalia
- Phylum: Arthropoda
- Clade: Pancrustacea
- Class: Insecta
- Order: Lepidoptera
- Family: Gelechiidae
- Genus: Gelechia
- Species: G. aglossella

Binomial name
- Gelechia aglossella Walker, 1866

Species of moth

Gelechia aglossella is a moth of the family Gelechiidae. It is found in South Africa.

Adults are cinereous, the forewings slightly rounded at the tips and with speckles here and there clustering and forming four incomplete bands. The exterior border is slightly convex and very oblique. The hindwings are pale cinereous.
