= Gelechia liberata =

Scientific classification
- Kingdom: Animalia
- Phylum: Arthropoda
- Clade: Pancrustacea
- Class: Insecta
- Order: Lepidoptera
- Family: Gelechiidae
- Genus: Gelechia
- Species: G. liberata

Binomial name
- Gelechia liberata Meyrick, 1910

Species of insect

Gelechia liberata is a moth of the family Gelechiidae. It is found in South Africa.

The wingspan is about 17 mm. The forewings are light ochreous-brownish, with some scattered fuscous and a few black scales. The base of the costa is suffused with dark fuscous, forming a short transverse mark near the base. There is a minute black subdorsal dot near the base and there are some strigulae of blackish irroration on the costa anteriorly. A subtriangular spot of fuscous suffusion is found on the dorsum at two-fifths, terminated above by a small blackish spot representing the plical stigma. A moderate spot of fuscous suffusion with some black scales is found on the costa at two-thirds, and another towards the dorsum before the tornus. The hindwings are grey.
