= Gelechia sirotina =

Scientific classification
- Kingdom: Animalia
- Phylum: Arthropoda
- Clade: Pancrustacea
- Class: Insecta
- Order: Lepidoptera
- Family: Gelechiidae
- Genus: Gelechia
- Species: G. sirotina

Binomial name
- Gelechia sirotina Omelko, 1986

Species of moth

Gelechia sirotina is a moth of the family Gelechiidae. It is found in Belarus, Tajikistan and the Russian Far East.
