= Gelechia exposita =

Scientific classification
- Kingdom: Animalia
- Phylum: Arthropoda
- Clade: Pancrustacea
- Class: Insecta
- Order: Lepidoptera
- Family: Gelechiidae
- Genus: Gelechia
- Species: G. exposita

Binomial name
- Gelechia exposita (Meyrick, 1926)

Synonyms
- Telphusa exposita Meyrick, 1926

Species of moth

Gelechia exposita is a moth of the family Gelechiidae. It is found on Borneo.
