= Gelechia abjunctella =

Scientific classification
- Kingdom: Animalia
- Phylum: Arthropoda
- Clade: Pancrustacea
- Class: Insecta
- Order: Lepidoptera
- Family: Gelechiidae
- Genus: Gelechia
- Species: G. abjunctella

Binomial name
- Gelechia abjunctella Walker, 1864

Species of moth

Gelechia abjunctella is a moth of the family Gelechiidae. It is found in South Africa.

Adults are blackish cinereous, the forewings with a few black points and with some cinereous speckles, wholly cinereous along the exterior border. The exterior border is very oblique. The hindwings are pale cinereous, shining.
