= Gelechia cuneifera =

Scientific classification
- Kingdom: Animalia
- Phylum: Arthropoda
- Clade: Pancrustacea
- Class: Insecta
- Order: Lepidoptera
- Family: Gelechiidae
- Genus: Gelechia
- Species: G. cuneifera

Binomial name
- Gelechia cuneifera Walsingham, 1911

Species of moth

Gelechia cuneifera is a moth of the family Gelechiidae. It is found in Mexico (Guerrero).

The wingspan is about 16 mm. The forewings are pale tawny grey, obscured at the apex and along the costa by darker shades of the same. The costal blotch extends from one-fifth to nearly three-fourths of the wing-length, its lower and inner edge shading to brownish fuscous, which forms first a broad wedge-shaped projection at about one-third, the apex crossing the fold, secondly, a brownish fuscous longitudinal streak reaching to the end of the cell above the middle of the wing. Between this costal blotch and the broad terminal shade the paler ground-colour reaches to the costa, suggesting a pale transverse band. A few brownish fuscous scales are distributed in patches around the apex. The hindwings are very pale grey.
