= Gelechia frequens =

Scientific classification
- Kingdom: Animalia
- Phylum: Arthropoda
- Clade: Pancrustacea
- Class: Insecta
- Order: Lepidoptera
- Family: Gelechiidae
- Genus: Gelechia
- Species: G. frequens

Binomial name
- Gelechia frequens (Meyrick, 1921)

Synonyms
- Phthorimaea frequens Meyrick, 1921

Species of moth

Gelechia frequens is a moth of the family Gelechiidae. It is found in Australia, where it has been recorded from Queensland.

The wingspan is about 10 mm. The forewings are whitish irrorated dark fuscous and with seven or eight blackish spots along the costa and a blackish mark on the fold towards the base. The stigmata are represented by blackish spots, the discal remote, an additional spot between these, the plical beneath first the discal. There are two confluent blackish spots before the upper part of the termen. The hindwings are light grey, paler and thinly scaled in the disc and towards the base.
