= Gelechia dujardini =

Scientific classification
- Kingdom: Animalia
- Phylum: Arthropoda
- Clade: Pancrustacea
- Class: Insecta
- Order: Lepidoptera
- Family: Gelechiidae
- Genus: Gelechia
- Species: G. dujardini

Binomial name
- Gelechia dujardini Huemer, 1991

Species of moth

Gelechia dujardini is a moth of the family Gelechiidae. It is found in France (Alpes Maritimes), Croatia, North Macedonia, Greece, Italy and Turkey.
