= Gelechia dyariella =

Scientific classification
- Kingdom: Animalia
- Phylum: Arthropoda
- Clade: Pancrustacea
- Class: Insecta
- Order: Lepidoptera
- Family: Gelechiidae
- Genus: Gelechia
- Species: G. dyariella

Binomial name
- Gelechia dyariella Busck, 1903

Species of moth

Gelechia dyariella is a moth of the family Gelechiidae. It is found in North America, where it has been recorded from Alberta, California, Colorado, Maine, Manitoba, Montana and Saskatchewan.

The wingspan is 14–18 mm. The forewings are whitish, but so heavily overlaid with dark fuscous and bluish black scales as to give the appearance to the naked eye of dark gray. At the base is an oblique, ill-defined, obscure, blackish streak and on the middle of the wing is a black oval dot followed by a short space of pure white. At the apical third is a large transverse blackish area across the wing, edged on the outside by a narrow zigzag white fascia. The hindwings are light silvery fuscous, darker toward the apex.

The larvae feed on Populus fremontii by folding up a young leaf by uniting the edges around the margin so that it forms a bag or box.
