= Gelechia dzunmodi =

Scientific classification
- Kingdom: Animalia
- Phylum: Arthropoda
- Clade: Pancrustacea
- Class: Insecta
- Order: Lepidoptera
- Family: Gelechiidae
- Genus: Gelechia
- Species: G. dzunmodi

Binomial name
- Gelechia dzunmodi Lvovsky & Piskunov, 1989

Species of moth

Gelechia dzunmodi is a moth of the family Gelechiidae. It is found in Palearctic realm.
