= Gelechia mediterranea =

Scientific classification
- Kingdom: Animalia
- Phylum: Arthropoda
- Clade: Pancrustacea
- Class: Insecta
- Order: Lepidoptera
- Family: Gelechiidae
- Genus: Gelechia
- Species: G. mediterranea

Binomial name
- Gelechia mediterranea Huemer, 1991

Species of moth

Gelechia mediterranea is a moth of the family Gelechiidae. It is found in France, Spain and Greece, as well as on Sardinia and Crete.

The larvae possibly feed on Acer species.
