= Gelechia horiaula =

Scientific classification
- Kingdom: Animalia
- Phylum: Arthropoda
- Clade: Pancrustacea
- Class: Insecta
- Order: Lepidoptera
- Family: Gelechiidae
- Genus: Gelechia
- Species: G. horiaula

Binomial name
- Gelechia horiaula Meyrick, 1918

Species of moth

Gelechia horiaula is a moth of the family Gelechiidae. It is found in north-western India.

The wingspan is about 13 mm. The forewings are dark fuscous, somewhat whitish-sprinkled towards the margins and with ochreous-white markings. There is a moderate transverse fascia from the costa at one-fourth, not reaching the dorsum. A transverse spot is found in the disc beyond the middle, not reaching the costa or the dorsum, both its sides prominent in the middle. There is also a semicircular blotch on the costa about four-fifths. The hindwings are grey.
