= Gelechia petraea =

Scientific classification
- Kingdom: Animalia
- Phylum: Arthropoda
- Clade: Pancrustacea
- Class: Insecta
- Order: Lepidoptera
- Family: Gelechiidae
- Genus: Gelechia
- Species: G. petraea

Binomial name
- Gelechia petraea Walsingham, 1911

Species of moth

Gelechia petraea is a moth of the family Gelechiidae. It is found in Guatemala.

The wingspan is about 18 mm. The forewings are whitish cinereous, or pale stone-colour, with a scarcely perceptible ochreous tinge and some scattered transverse greyish brown speckling. A greyish-brown spot at the base of the costa is succeeded by three costal dots before the middle and an elongate costal streak about the middle and a smaller spot on the middle of the fold, with a discal spot above it, form with the medio-costal streak an inwardly oblique series. A small greyish fuscous spot occurs also at the end of the cell and the apex and termen are covered by a rather broad greyish brown patch, of which the inner margin is clearly defined and convex. The hindwings are brassy brownish along the veins and costa, inclining to semitransparent bluish grey between the veins.
