= Gelechia haifella =

Scientific classification
- Kingdom: Animalia
- Phylum: Arthropoda
- Clade: Pancrustacea
- Class: Insecta
- Order: Lepidoptera
- Family: Gelechiidae
- Genus: Gelechia
- Species: G. haifella

Binomial name
- Gelechia haifella Amsel, 1935

Species of moth

Gelechia haifella is a moth of the family Gelechiidae. It is found in Palestine.
