= Gelechia allomima =

Scientific classification
- Kingdom: Animalia
- Phylum: Arthropoda
- Clade: Pancrustacea
- Class: Insecta
- Order: Lepidoptera
- Family: Gelechiidae
- Genus: Gelechia
- Species: G. allomima

Binomial name
- Gelechia allomima Meyrick, 1938

Species of moth

Gelechia allomima is a moth of the family Gelechiidae. It is found in the Democratic Republic of Congo (North Kivu).
