= Gelechia ophiaula =

Scientific classification
- Kingdom: Animalia
- Phylum: Arthropoda
- Clade: Pancrustacea
- Class: Insecta
- Order: Lepidoptera
- Family: Gelechiidae
- Genus: Gelechia
- Species: G. ophiaula

Binomial name
- Gelechia ophiaula Meyrick, 1931

Species of moth

Gelechia ophiaula is a moth of the family Gelechiidae. It is found in Argentina and Paraguay.
