= Gelechia epiphloea =

Scientific classification
- Kingdom: Animalia
- Phylum: Arthropoda
- Clade: Pancrustacea
- Class: Insecta
- Order: Lepidoptera
- Family: Gelechiidae
- Genus: Gelechia
- Species: G. epiphloea

Binomial name
- Gelechia epiphloea Meyrick, 1913

Species of moth

Gelechia epiphloea is a moth of the family Gelechiidae first described by Edward Meyrick in 1913. It is found in South Africa.

The wingspan is about 22 mm. The forewings are fuscous irregularly mixed with dark fuscous and ochreous whitish. There are blackish spots on the costa at the base and before one-fourth, the space between and around these suffused with ochreous whitish. There is a suffused blackish spot in the disc at one-fourth, and a short blackish streak on the fold before this. The stigmata are blackish, the plical rather before the first discal, the first discal followed by a more or less extended ochreous-whitish mark. There is a blackish spot on the costa at three-fourths, indistinctly connected with the second discal stigma, and followed by a rosy-ochreous-whitish spot, where an angulated series of undefined ochreous-whitish dots runs to the tornus. The hindwings are grey, somewhat darker posteriorly.
