= Gelechia resecta =

Scientific classification
- Kingdom: Animalia
- Phylum: Arthropoda
- Clade: Pancrustacea
- Class: Insecta
- Order: Lepidoptera
- Family: Gelechiidae
- Genus: Gelechia
- Species: G. resecta

Binomial name
- Gelechia resecta Meyrick, 1913

Species of moth

Gelechia resecta is a moth of the family Gelechiidae first described by Edward Meyrick in 1913. It is found in South Africa.

The wingspan is about 11 mm. The forewings are grey, sprinkled with whitish points and scattered blackish scales and with a black mark on the base of the costa, one along the base of the dorsum, and a small irregular spot between these. There is an irregular blotch of blackish suffusion in the disc at one-fourth. The stigmata are rather large, suffused, black, the plical near before the first discal, the second discal edged with white posteriorly, touching a blotch of blackish irroration (sprinkles) on the costa beyond the middle, and a small tornal spot. The hindwings are grey, thinly scaled in the disc and towards the base.
