= Gelechia elephantopis =

Scientific classification
- Kingdom: Animalia
- Phylum: Arthropoda
- Clade: Pancrustacea
- Class: Insecta
- Order: Lepidoptera
- Family: Gelechiidae
- Genus: Gelechia
- Species: G. elephantopis

Binomial name
- Gelechia elephantopis Meyrick, 1936

Species of moth

Gelechia elephantopis is a moth of the family Gelechiidae. It is found in Venezuela.
