= Gelechia mimella =

Scientific classification
- Kingdom: Animalia
- Phylum: Arthropoda
- Clade: Pancrustacea
- Class: Insecta
- Order: Lepidoptera
- Family: Gelechiidae
- Genus: Gelechia
- Species: G. mimella

Binomial name
- Gelechia mimella Clemens, 1860

Species of moth

Gelechia mimella is a moth of the family Gelechiidae. It is found in North America, where it has been recorded from Pennsylvania.

The forewings are tawny brown, with an ochreous band near the tip, margined internally slightly with dark brown. Along the costa are a few dark brown spots and a few in the apical portion behind the ochreous band. The hindwings are dark brown.
