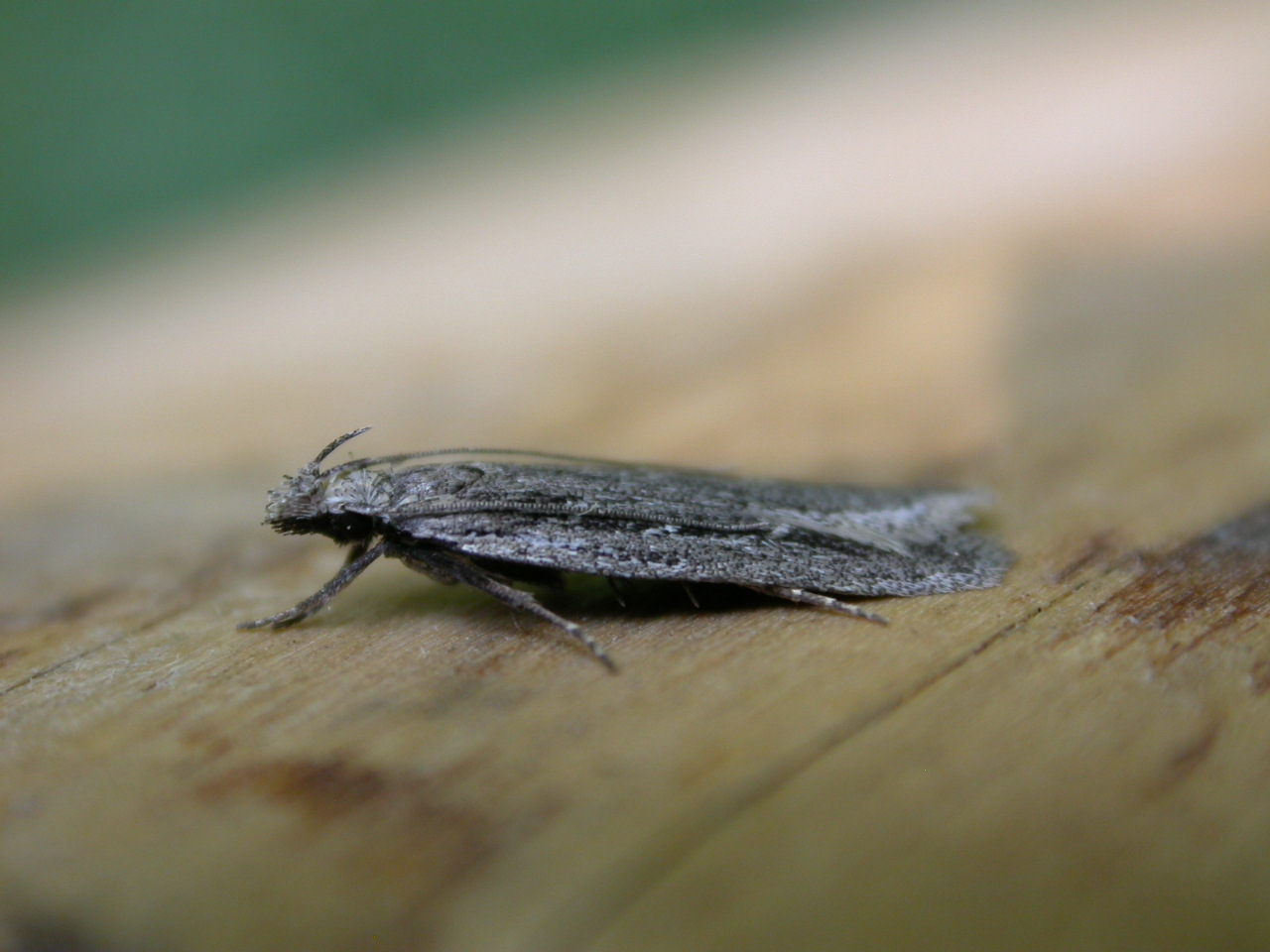

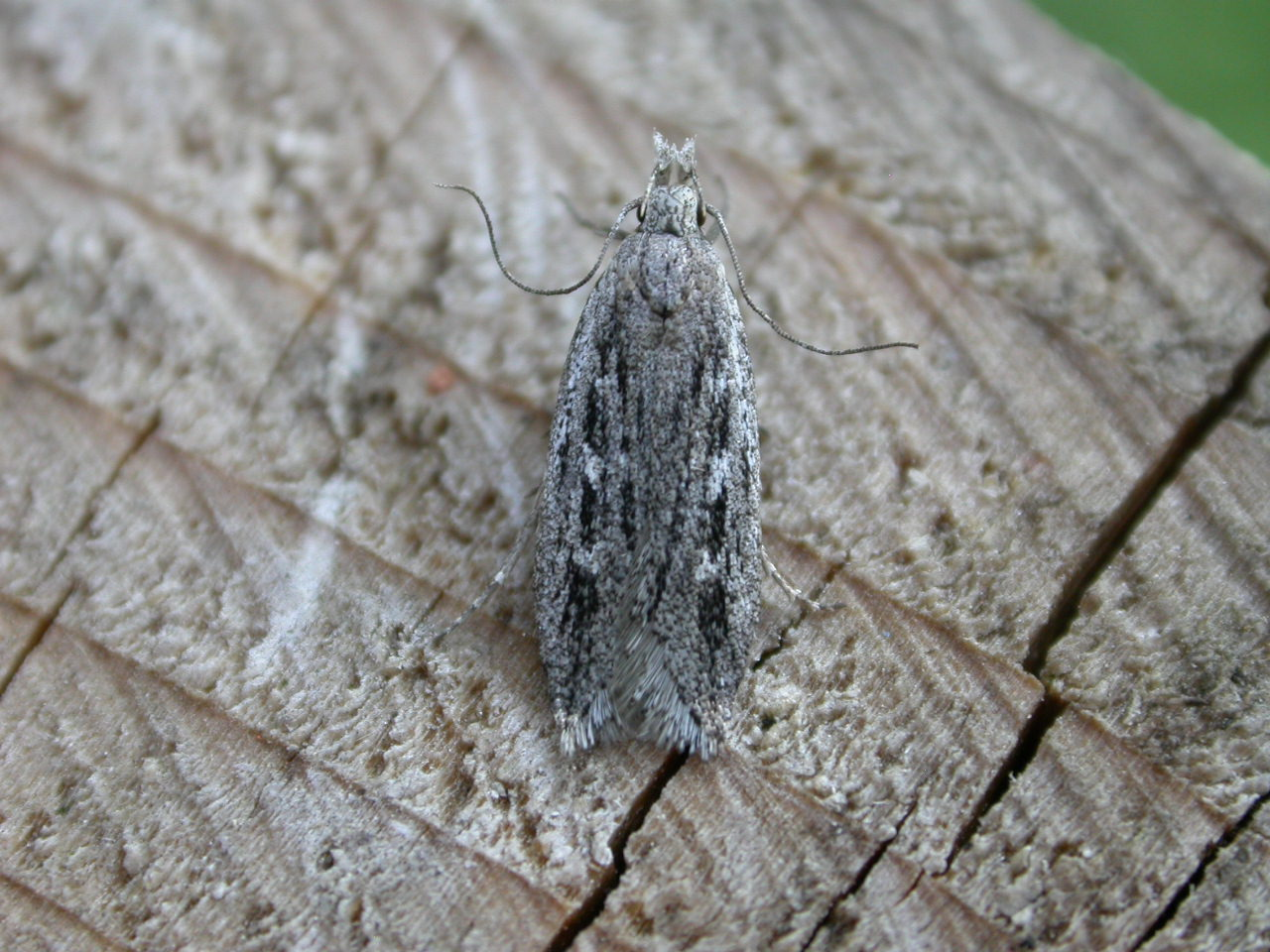

Scientific classification
- Kingdom: Animalia
- Phylum: Arthropoda
- Clade: Pancrustacea
- Class: Insecta
- Order: Lepidoptera
- Family: Gelechiidae
- Genus: Gelechia
- Species: G. sabinellus

Binomial name
- Gelechia sabinellus (Zeller, 1839)

Synonyms
- Ypsolophus sabinellus Zeller, 1839; Gelechia sabinella; Nothris hoffmanniella Strand, 1902; Nothris kalevalella Kanerva, 1936; Nothris corsella Rebel, 1930

= Gelechia sabinellus =

Juniper gelechiid moth

Species of moth

Gelechia sabinellus, the juniper gelechiid moth, is a moth of the family Gelechiidae. It is known from most of Europe. It is an introduced species in Great Britain and North America through accidental introduction in garden junipers.

The wingspan is 15–18 mm. Adults are on wing in August.

The larvae feed on Juniperus species, including Juniperus communis.

== Subspecies ==
- Gelechia sabinellus sabinellus
- Gelechia sabinellus corsella Rebel, 1930 (Corsica)
