= Gelechia stenacma =

Scientific classification
- Kingdom: Animalia
- Phylum: Arthropoda
- Clade: Pancrustacea
- Class: Insecta
- Order: Lepidoptera
- Family: Gelechiidae
- Genus: Gelechia
- Species: G. stenacma

Binomial name
- Gelechia stenacma Meyrick, 1935

Species of insect

Gelechia stenacma is a moth of the family Gelechiidae. It is found in central India.
