= Gelechia dolbyi =

Scientific classification
- Kingdom: Animalia
- Phylum: Arthropoda
- Clade: Pancrustacea
- Class: Insecta
- Order: Lepidoptera
- Family: Gelechiidae
- Genus: Gelechia
- Species: G. dolbyi

Binomial name
- Gelechia dolbyi (Walsingham, 1911)

Synonyms
- Dichomeris dolbyi Walsingham, 1911

Species of moth

Gelechia dolbyi is a moth of the family Gelechiidae. It is found in Panama.

The wingspan is about 14 mm. The forewings are dark brown, with an oblique yellowish white band commencing on the costa at one-fifth from the base and attenuate outward and downward to a little beyond the fold. There is a costal spot of the same colour, with a few whitish scales about the tornus. The hindwings are greyish fuscous.
