= Gelechia tribalanota =

Scientific classification
- Kingdom: Animalia
- Phylum: Arthropoda
- Clade: Pancrustacea
- Class: Insecta
- Order: Lepidoptera
- Family: Gelechiidae
- Genus: Gelechia
- Species: G. tribalanota

Binomial name
- Gelechia tribalanota Meyrick, 1935

Species of moth

Gelechia tribalanota is a moth of the family Gelechiidae. It was described by Edward Meyrick in 1935. It is found in southern China.
