= Gelechia impurgata =

Scientific classification
- Kingdom: Animalia
- Phylum: Arthropoda
- Clade: Pancrustacea
- Class: Insecta
- Order: Lepidoptera
- Family: Gelechiidae
- Genus: Gelechia
- Species: G. impurgata

Binomial name
- Gelechia impurgata Walsingham, 1911

Species of moth

Gelechia impurgata is a moth of the family Gelechiidae. It is found in Mexico (Sonora).

The wingspan is about 14 mm. The forewings are cream-white, with a conspicuous fuscous blotch obliquely placed on the cell, somewhat diffused at its outer end, but broken into scattered scaling which unites again in an elongate median streak beyond the end of the cell. The apex and termen are also dusted with fuscous. The hindwings are pale brownish grey.
