= Gelechia sematica =

Scientific classification
- Kingdom: Animalia
- Phylum: Arthropoda
- Clade: Pancrustacea
- Class: Insecta
- Order: Lepidoptera
- Family: Gelechiidae
- Genus: Gelechia
- Species: G. sematica

Binomial name
- Gelechia sematica (Meyrick, 1913)

Synonyms
- Telphusa sematica Meyrick, 1913

Species of moth

Gelechia sematica is a moth of the family Gelechiidae first described by Edward Meyrick in 1913. It is found in Namibia and South Africa.

The wingspan is about 12 mm. The forewings are pale greyish ochreous closely irrorated (sprinkled) with dark fuscous, and tinged with purplish grey. There are four small blackish spots on the costa between the base and two-thirds, each accompanied beneath by a small ochreous spot. Some blackish suffusion is found towards the base of the dorsum and there are four small spots of raised pale ochreous scales towards the dorsum between one-third and the tornus, as well as some blackish suffusion in the disc about one-third. The stigmata are obscure, blackish, the plical rather before the first discal, both discal accompanied by small raised ochreous spots. There is a transverse rounded-triangular purple-blackish blotch in the disc towards the apex and the posterior part of the costa and termen is spotted with pale ochreous and blackish. The hindwings are grey, paler and thinly scaled in the disc and anteriorly.
