= Gelechia repetitrix =

Scientific classification
- Kingdom: Animalia
- Phylum: Arthropoda
- Clade: Pancrustacea
- Class: Insecta
- Order: Lepidoptera
- Family: Gelechiidae
- Genus: Gelechia
- Species: G. repetitrix

Binomial name
- Gelechia repetitrix Meyrick, 1931

Species of moth

Gelechia repetitrix is a moth of the family Gelechiidae. It is found in Asia Minor.
