= Gelechia flavipalpella =

Scientific classification
- Kingdom: Animalia
- Phylum: Arthropoda
- Clade: Pancrustacea
- Class: Insecta
- Order: Lepidoptera
- Family: Gelechiidae
- Genus: Gelechia
- Species: G. flavipalpella

Binomial name
- Gelechia flavipalpella Walsingham, 1881

Species of moth

Gelechia flavipalpella is a moth of the family Gelechiidae. It is found in the Democratic Republic of Congo and South Africa.

The wingspan is about 17 mm. The forewings are fuscous with a purplish tinge and with an almost obsolete darker fuscous spot beyond the end of the cell. The hindwings are cinereous.
