= Gelechia sattleri =

Scientific classification
- Kingdom: Animalia
- Phylum: Arthropoda
- Clade: Pancrustacea
- Class: Insecta
- Order: Lepidoptera
- Family: Gelechiidae
- Genus: Gelechia
- Species: G. sattleri

Binomial name
- Gelechia sattleri Piskunov, 1982

Species of moth

Gelechia sattleri is a moth of the family Gelechiidae. It was described by Piskunov in 1982. It is found in Armenia and Kazakhstan.

The larvae feed on Juniperus polycarpos.
