= Gelechia pistaciae =

Scientific classification
- Kingdom: Animalia
- Phylum: Arthropoda
- Clade: Pancrustacea
- Class: Insecta
- Order: Lepidoptera
- Family: Gelechiidae
- Genus: Gelechia
- Species: G. pistaciae

Binomial name
- Gelechia pistaciae Filipjev, 1934

Species of moth

Gelechia pistaciae is a moth of the family Gelechiidae. It was described by Filipjev in 1934. It is found in Asia Minor and the Middle East.

The larvae feed on the fruit of Pistacia vera, devouring the epicarpio of the fruit.
