= Gelechia mundata =

Scientific classification
- Kingdom: Animalia
- Phylum: Arthropoda
- Clade: Pancrustacea
- Class: Insecta
- Order: Lepidoptera
- Family: Gelechiidae
- Genus: Gelechia
- Species: G. mundata

Binomial name
- Gelechia mundata (Meyrick, 1929)

Synonyms
- Nothris mundata Meyrick, 1929

Species of moth

Gelechia mundata is a moth of the family Gelechiidae. It is found in North America, where it has been recorded from New Mexico.
