= Gelechia fuscooculata =

Scientific classification
- Kingdom: Animalia
- Phylum: Arthropoda
- Clade: Pancrustacea
- Class: Insecta
- Order: Lepidoptera
- Family: Gelechiidae
- Genus: Gelechia
- Species: G. fuscooculata

Binomial name
- Gelechia fuscooculata Omelko, 1986

Species of moth

Gelechia fuscooculata is a moth of the family Gelechiidae. It is found in Russia and Japan.
