= Gelechia albatella =

Scientific classification
- Kingdom: Animalia
- Phylum: Arthropoda
- Clade: Pancrustacea
- Class: Insecta
- Order: Lepidoptera
- Family: Gelechiidae
- Genus: Gelechia
- Species: G. albatella

Binomial name
- Gelechia albatella Walker, 1864

Species of moth

Gelechia albatella is a moth of the family Gelechiidae. It is found in Sri Lanka.

Adults are whitish, the forewings speckled with fawn-colour and with the exterior border extremely oblique.
