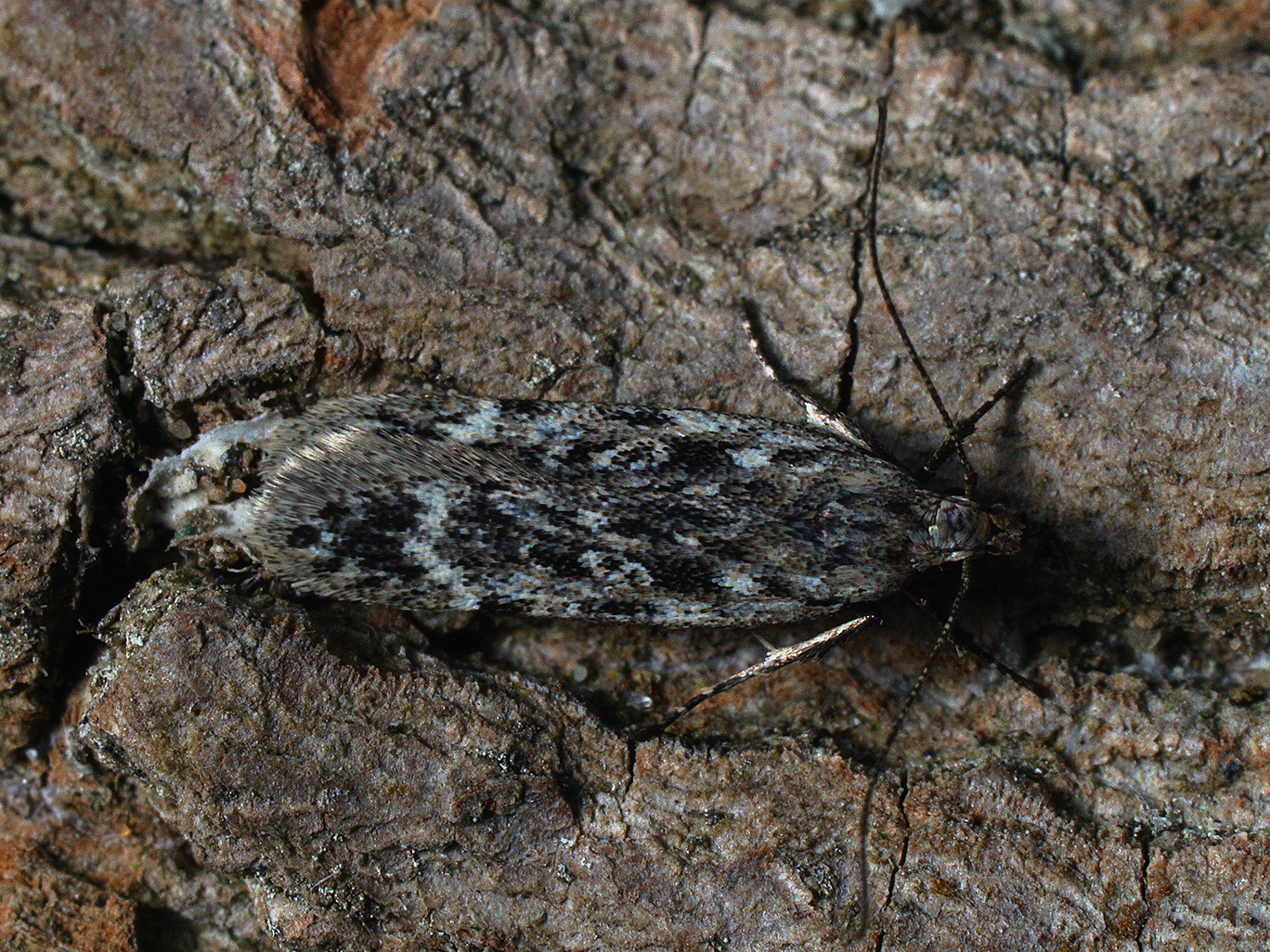

Scientific classification
- Kingdom: Animalia
- Phylum: Arthropoda
- Clade: Pancrustacea
- Class: Insecta
- Order: Lepidoptera
- Family: Gelechiidae
- Genus: Gelechia
- Species: G. cuneatella

Binomial name
- Gelechia cuneatella (Douglas, 1852)

Synonyms
- Lita cuneatella Douglas, 1852

= Gelechia cuneatella =

Species of moth

Gelechia cuneatella, the long-winged groundling, is a moth of the family Gelechiidae. It was described by Douglas in 1852. It is found in northern, central and eastern Europe, Russia, China (Xinjiang, Jilin) and Japan. The habitat consists of river banks and marshes.

The wingspan is 13–16 mm. Adult are on wing from August to September in one generation per year.
