= Gelechia clopica =

Scientific classification
- Kingdom: Animalia
- Phylum: Arthropoda
- Clade: Pancrustacea
- Class: Insecta
- Order: Lepidoptera
- Family: Gelechiidae
- Genus: Gelechia
- Species: G. clopica

Binomial name
- Gelechia clopica Meyrick, 1931

Species of moth

Gelechia clopica is a moth of the family Gelechiidae. It is found in Argentina.
