= Gelechia sonorensis =

Scientific classification
- Kingdom: Animalia
- Phylum: Arthropoda
- Clade: Pancrustacea
- Class: Insecta
- Order: Lepidoptera
- Family: Gelechiidae
- Genus: Gelechia
- Species: G. sonorensis

Binomial name
- Gelechia sonorensis Walsingham, 1911

Species of moth

Gelechia sonorensis is a moth of the family Gelechiidae. It is found in Mexico (Sonora).

The wingspan is about 11 mm. The forewings are whitish ochreous along the costal third, with a black spot at the extreme base of the costa and two elongate sooty fuscous spots on the costa, one before and one beyond the middle. The dorsal two-thirds are sooty fuscous, interrupted by an oblique branch of the paler costal surface running towards the tornus, beyond which a sooty streak runs to the apex and through the cilia. The upper edge of the dark portion is slightly undulate and there is some admixture of ochreous scales upon its whole surface. The hindwings are grey.
