= Gelechia longipalpella =

Scientific classification
- Kingdom: Animalia
- Phylum: Arthropoda
- Clade: Pancrustacea
- Class: Insecta
- Order: Lepidoptera
- Family: Gelechiidae
- Genus: Gelechia
- Species: G. longipalpella

Binomial name
- Gelechia longipalpella Teich, 1899

Species of moth

Gelechia longipalpella is a moth of the family Gelechiidae, found in Lithuania.
