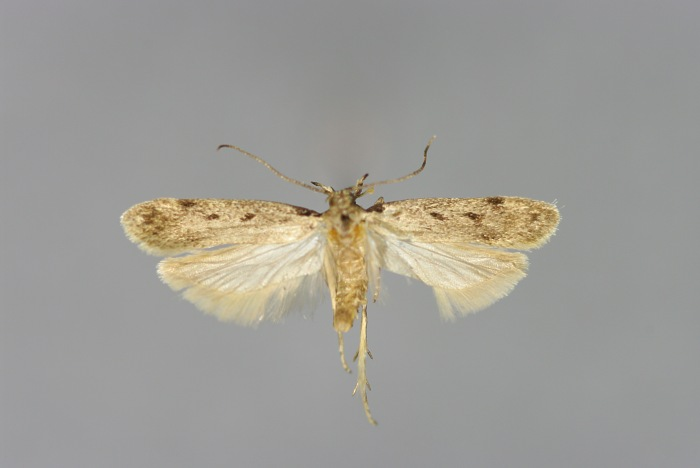
- Gelechia rhombella

Scientific classification
- Kingdom: Animalia
- Phylum: Arthropoda
- Clade: Pancrustacea
- Class: Insecta
- Order: Lepidoptera
- Family: Gelechiidae
- Genus: Gelechia
- Species: G. rhombella

Binomial name
- Gelechia rhombella (Denis & Schiffermüller, 1775)

Synonyms
- Tinea rhombella Denis & Schiffermüller, 1775; Tinea axilella Thunberg, 1794; Recurvaria rhombea Haworth, 1828; Gelechia cinereoradicica Szent-Ivány, 1942

= Gelechia rhombella =

Species of moth

Gelechia rhombella, the apple groundling, is a moth of the family Gelechiidae. It is found in Europe, the Caucasus, Transcaucasia, southern Siberia, the Russian Far East, Korea and China (Gansu, Qinghai, Jilin).

The wingspan is 13–17 mm. Terminal joint of palpi as long as second. Forewings pale ochreous to light fuscous, sprinkled with black; a black spot along costa at base, and another at 2/3; stigmata black, plical minute, second discal usually forming a bent mark; a dark tornal spot; sometimes a faint pale angulated fascia at 3/4; usually blackish terminal spots. Hindwings somewhat over 1, pale grey, darker terminally. Larva dark green, sides reddish-tinged; subdorsal and spiracular lines whitish; head dark brown; plate of 2 black, bisected: between joined leaves of apple.

The larvae feed on Malus species (including Malus domestica) and Pyrus communis.
