= Gelechia paroxynta =

Scientific classification
- Kingdom: Animalia
- Phylum: Arthropoda
- Clade: Pancrustacea
- Class: Insecta
- Order: Lepidoptera
- Family: Gelechiidae
- Genus: Gelechia
- Species: G. paroxynta

Binomial name
- Gelechia paroxynta Meyrick, 1931

Species of moth

Gelechia paroxynta is a moth of the family Gelechiidae. It is found in Tibet.
