= Gelechia thymiata =

Scientific classification
- Kingdom: Animalia
- Phylum: Arthropoda
- Clade: Pancrustacea
- Class: Insecta
- Order: Lepidoptera
- Family: Gelechiidae
- Genus: Gelechia
- Species: G. thymiata

Binomial name
- Gelechia thymiata (Meyrick, 1929)

Synonyms
- Nothris thymiata Meyrick, 1929

Species of moth

Gelechia thymiata is a moth of the family Gelechiidae. It was described by Edward Meyrick in 1929. It is found in North America, where it has been recorded from Arizona.
