= Gelechia gammanella =

Scientific classification
- Kingdom: Animalia
- Phylum: Arthropoda
- Clade: Pancrustacea
- Class: Insecta
- Order: Lepidoptera
- Family: Gelechiidae
- Genus: Gelechia
- Species: G. gammanella

Binomial name
- Gelechia gammanella Walker, 1864

Species of moth

Gelechia gammanella is a moth of the family Gelechiidae. It is found on Borneo.

Adults are dark cupreous, the forewings rounded at the tips with a yellow costal triangular spot at three-fourths of the length, emitting a slight streak to the disk. The exterior border is convex and very oblique.
