= Gelechia teleiodella =

Scientific classification
- Kingdom: Animalia
- Phylum: Arthropoda
- Clade: Pancrustacea
- Class: Insecta
- Order: Lepidoptera
- Family: Gelechiidae
- Genus: Gelechia
- Species: G. teleiodella

Binomial name
- Gelechia teleiodella M. Omelko, 1986

Synonyms
- Gelechia (Mesogelechia) teleiodella M. Omelko, 1986

Species of moth

Gelechia teleiodella is a moth of the family Gelechiidae. It was described by Mikhail Mikhailovich Omelko in 1986. It is found in the Russian Far East (Primorsky Krai) and China (Gansu, Jilin).
