= Gelechia basipunctella =

Scientific classification
- Kingdom: Animalia
- Phylum: Arthropoda
- Clade: Pancrustacea
- Class: Insecta
- Order: Lepidoptera
- Family: Gelechiidae
- Genus: Gelechia
- Species: G. basipunctella

Binomial name
- Gelechia basipunctella Herrich-Schäffer, 1854

Synonyms
- Gelechia albicans Heinemann, 1870; Gelechia basiguttella Heinemann, 1870

Species of moth

Gelechia basipunctella is a moth of the family Gelechiidae. It is found in from central Europe to Russia (Middle Volga, southern Ural, southern Siberia), Turkey and Mongolia.

The larvae feed on Salix species.
