= Gelechia paraula =

Scientific classification
- Kingdom: Animalia
- Phylum: Arthropoda
- Clade: Pancrustacea
- Class: Insecta
- Order: Lepidoptera
- Family: Gelechiidae
- Genus: Gelechia
- Species: G. paraula

Binomial name
- Gelechia paraula (Meyrick, 1916)

Synonyms
- Telphusa paraula Meyrick, 1916

Species of moth

Gelechia paraula is a moth of the family Gelechiidae. It was described by Edward Meyrick in 1916. It is found in southern India and Sri Lanka.

The wingspan is 14–15 mm. The forewings are rather dark reddish fuscous, with the bases of the scales more or less whitish and the base spotted with dark fuscous, with an ochreous-yellowish dot in the middle, and one beneath the costa near the base. There are cloudy dark fuscous spots on the costa before one-third, before the middle, and at two-thirds, the first with a pale yellowish raised dot adjacent to its lower extremity. Two cloudy dark fuscous dots are centred with yellowish raised scales obliquely placed in the disc at one-fourth, two others similarly placed (representing the stigmata) before the middle, and two transversely placed at two-thirds. There is a cloudy dark fuscous spot on the tornus opposite the third costal and sometimes undefined oblique fasciae of darker suffusion crossing the wing from the first two costal spots. The hindwings are thinly scaled, light greyish, tending to become prismatic hyaline, with the veins, termen, and posterior half of the costal area darker grey.
