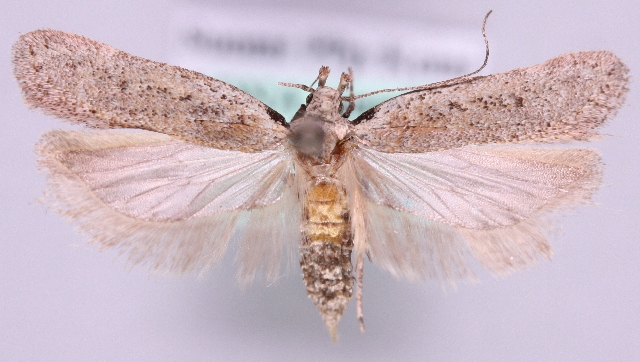
- Gelechia hippophaella

Scientific classification
- Kingdom: Animalia
- Phylum: Arthropoda
- Clade: Pancrustacea
- Class: Insecta
- Order: Lepidoptera
- Family: Gelechiidae
- Tribe: Gelechiini
- Genus: Gelechia; Hübner, [1825]

Synonyms
- Guenea Bruand, 1850; Galechia Desmarest, [1857]; Gelschia Nowicki, 1865; Cirrha Chambers, 1872; Oeseis Chambers, 1875; Gelecia Watt, 1920; Mesogelechia Omelko, 1986

= Gelechia =

Genus of moths

Gelechia is a genus of moths in the family Gelechiidae. The type species is Gelechia rhombella.

== Species ==
- Subgenus Gelechia
  - Gelechia asinella (Hubner, 1796)
  - Gelechia aspoecki Huemer, 1992
  - Gelechia atlanticella (Amsel, 1955)
  - Gelechia basipunctella Herrich-Schaffer, 1854
  - Gelechia cuneatella Douglas, 1852
  - Gelechia dujardini Huemer, 1991
  - Gelechia hippophaella (Schrank, 1802)
  - Gelechia jakovlevi Krulikovsky, 1905
  - Gelechia mediterranea Huemer, 1991
  - Gelechia muscosella Zeller, 1839
  - Gelechia nervosella (Zerny, 1927)
  - Gelechia nigra (Haworth, 1828)
  - Gelechia rhombella (Denis & Schiffermuller, 1775)
  - Gelechia rhombelliformis Staudinger, 1871
  - Gelechia sabinellus (Zeller, 1839)
  - Gelechia scotinella Herrich-Schaffer, 1854
  - Gelechia senticetella (Staudinger, 1859)
  - Gelechia sestertiella Herrich-Schaffer, 1854
  - Gelechia sororculella (Hubner, 1817)
  - Gelechia turpella (Denis & Schiffermuller, 1775)
- Subgenus Mesogelechia Omelko, 1986
  - Gelechia sirotina Omelko, 1986
- Unplaced to subgenus
  - Gelechia abjunctella Walker, 1864
  - Gelechia aglossella Walker, 1866
  - Gelechia albatella Walker, 1864
  - Gelechia albisparsella (Chambers, 1872)
  - Gelechia albomaculata Omelko, 1986
  - Gelechia allomima Meyrick, 1938
  - Gelechia allotria Meyrick, 1925
  - Gelechia anagramma Meyrick, 1921
  - Gelechia anarsiella Chambers, 1877
  - Gelechia angustella Walker, 1864
  - Gelechia anomorcta Meyrick, 1926
  - Gelechia anthochra Lower, 1896
  - Gelechia anthracopa Meyrick, 1922
  - Gelechia arotrias Meyrick, 1908
  - Gelechia atrofusca Omelko, 1986
  - Gelechia badiomaculella Chambers, 1872
  - Gelechia bathrochlora Meyrick, 1932
  - Gelechia benitella Barnes & Busck, 1920
  - Gelechia bergiella Teich, 1886
  - Gelechia bianulella (Chambers, 1875)
  - Gelechia bistrigella (Chambers, 1872)
  - Gelechia capiteochrella Chambers, 1875
  - Gelechia caudatae Clarke, 1934
  - Gelechia chionomima Meyrick, 1929
  - Gelechia clandestina Omelko, 1986
  - Gelechia clopica Meyrick, 1931
  - Gelechia conditor Omelko, 1986
  - Gelechia cuneifera Walsingham, 1911
  - Gelechia cuspidatella Turati, 1934
  - Gelechia delapsa Meyrick, 1931
  - Gelechia delodectis Meyrick, 1938
  - Gelechia desiliens Meyrick, 1923
  - Gelechia diacmota Meyrick, 1932
  - Gelechia discostrigella Chambers, 1875
  - Gelechia dolbyi (Walsingham, 1911)
  - Gelechia dromicella Busck, 1910
  - Gelechia dyariella Busck, 1903
  - Gelechia dzunmodi Lvovsky & Piskunov, 1989
  - Gelechia ekhingolica Lvovsky & Piskunov, 1989
  - Gelechia elephantopis Meyrick, 1936
  - Gelechia epiphloea Meyrick, 1913
  - Gelechia epistolica Meyrick, 1931
  - Gelechia exclarella Möschler, 1890
  - Gelechia exposita (Meyrick, 1926)
  - Gelechia farinosa Teich, 1899
  - Gelechia fecunda Meyrick, 1918
  - Gelechia flavipalpella Walsingham, 1881
  - Gelechia flexurella Clemens, 1860
  - Gelechia frequens (Meyrick, 1921)
  - Gelechia fuscooculata Omelko, 1986
  - Gelechia gammanella Walker, 1864
  - Gelechia goniospila Meyrick, 1931
  - Gelechia gracula (Meyrick, 1929)
  - Gelechia griseaella (Chambers, 1872)
  - Gelechia griseella (Chambers, 1874)
  - Gelechia grisseochrella Chambers, 1875
  - Gelechia haifella Amsel, 1935
  - Gelechia hetaeria Walsingham, 1911
  - Gelechia horiaula Meyrick, 1918
  - Gelechia hyoscyamella (Rebel, 1912)
  - Gelechia impurgata Walsingham, 1911
  - Gelechia inconspicua Omelko, 1986
  - Gelechia inferialis (Meyrick, 1918)
  - Gelechia intermedia Braun, 1923
  - Gelechia invenustella Berg, 1876
  - Gelechia junctipunctella Caradja, 1920
  - Gelechia lactiflora Meyrick, 1921
  - Gelechia leptospora Meyrick, 1932
  - Gelechia liberata Meyrick, 1910
  - Gelechia longipalpella Teich, 1899
  - Gelechia lynceella Zeller, 1873
  - Gelechia machinata (Meyrick, 1929)
  - Gelechia maculatusella Chambers, 1875
  - Gelechia mandella Busck, 1904
  - Gelechia marmoratella Walker, 1864
  - Gelechia melanoptila (Lower, 1897)
  - Gelechia mimella Clemens, 1860
  - Gelechia monella Busck, 1904
  - Gelechia mundata (Meyrick, 1929)
  - Gelechia notabilis Omelko, 1986
  - Gelechia obscurella Chambers, 1872
  - Gelechia ocherfuscella Chambers, 1875
  - Gelechia ochrocorys Meyrick, 1936
  - Gelechia omphalopis Meyrick, 1926
  - Gelechia ophiaula Meyrick, 1931
  - Gelechia overhaldensis Strand, 1920
  - Gelechia packardella Chambers, 1877
  - Gelechia pallidagriseella Chambers, 1874
  - Gelechia palpialbella Chambers, 1875
  - Gelechia panella Busck, 1903
  - Gelechia paraula (Meyrick, 1916)
  - Gelechia paroxynta Meyrick, 1931
  - Gelechia petraea Walsingham, 1911
  - Gelechia picrogramma Meyrick, 1929
  - Gelechia pisarevi Lvovsky & Piskunov, 1989
  - Gelechia pistaciae Filipjev, 1934
  - Gelechia platydoxa Meyrick, 1923
  - Gelechia praestantella Lucas, 1956
  - Gelechia repetitrix Meyrick, 1931
  - Gelechia rescissella Zeller, 1852
  - Gelechia resecta Meyrick, 1913
  - Gelechia ribesella Chambers, 1875
  - Gelechia rileyella (Chambers, 1872)
  - Gelechia sachalinensis Matsumura, 1931
  - Gelechia sattleri Piskunov, 1982
  - Gelechia sematica (Meyrick, 1913)
  - Gelechia sonorensis Walsingham, 1911
  - Gelechia stenacma Meyrick, 1935
  - Gelechia suspensa Meyrick, 1923
  - Gelechia teleiodella Omelko, 1986
  - Gelechia tetraleuca Meyrick, 1918
  - Gelechia thoracestrigella Chambers, 1875
  - Gelechia thymiata (Meyrick, 1929)
  - Gelechia trachydyta (Meyrick, 1920)
  - Gelechia traducella Busck, 1914
  - Gelechia tribalanota Meyrick, 1935
  - Gelechia turangella Lvovsky & Piskunov, 1989
  - Gelechia unistrigella Chambers, 1873
  - Gelechia veneranda Walsingham, 1911
  - Gelechia versutella Zeller, 1873
  - Gelechia wacoella Chambers, 1874

== Placement unclear ==
- Gelechia amorphella Chambers, 1877
- Gelechia discoanulella Chambers, 1875

== Former species ==
- Gelechia acanthopis Meyrick, 1932
- Gelechia adapterella Walker, 1864
- Gelechia bufo Walsingham, 1911
- Gelechia cacoderma Walsingham, 1911
- Gelechia caespitella Zeller, 1877
- Gelechia cerussata Walsingham, 1911
- Gelechia chlorocephala Meyrick, 1932
- Gelechia concinna Walsingham, 1911
- Gelechia creberrima Walsingham, 1911
- Gelechia crudescens Meyrick, 1920
- Gelechia elaboratella Braun, 1923
- Gelechia flammulella Walsingham, 1897
- Gelechia gnathodoxa Meyrick, 1926
- Gelechia lapidescens Meyrick, 1916
- Gelechia nephelophracta Meyrick, 1932
- Gelechia neptica Walsingham, 1911
- Gelechia nigripectus Walsingham, 1911
- Gelechia nucifer Walsingham, 1911
- Gelechia ophiomorpha Meyrick, 1935
- Gelechia pertinens Meyrick, 1931
- Gelechia pleroma Walsingham, 1911
- Gelechia protozona Meyrick, 1926
- Gelechia rhypodes Walsingham, 1911
- Gelechia sexgutella is now in Stilbosis sexgutella (Walker, 1864)
- Gelechia scotodes Walsingham, 1911
- Gelechia synthetica Walsingham, 1911
- Gelechia tannuolella Rebel, 1917
- Gelechia tragicella (Heyden, 1865)
- Gelechia xylobathra Meyrick, 1936
- Gelechia xylophaea Meyrick, 1921
