= Gelechia allotria =

Scientific classification
- Kingdom: Animalia
- Phylum: Arthropoda
- Clade: Pancrustacea
- Class: Insecta
- Order: Lepidoptera
- Family: Gelechiidae
- Genus: Gelechia
- Species: G. allotria

Binomial name
- Gelechia allotria Meyrick, 1925

Synonyms
- Gelechia anarsiella Chrétien, 1915 (preocc. Chambers, 1877)

Species of moth

Gelechia allotria is a moth of the family Gelechiidae. It is found in North Africa, where it has only been recorded from Algeria.

The wingspan is about 11 mm. The forewings are grey and the hindwings brown.
