= Gelechia anagramma =

Scientific classification
- Kingdom: Animalia
- Phylum: Arthropoda
- Clade: Pancrustacea
- Class: Insecta
- Order: Lepidoptera
- Family: Gelechiidae
- Genus: Gelechia
- Species: G. anagramma

Binomial name
- Gelechia anagramma Meyrick, 1921

Species of moth

Gelechia anagramma is a moth of the family Gelechiidae first described by Edward Meyrick in 1921. It is native to South Africa.

The wingspan is about 21 mm. The forewings are fuscous, the bases of the scales grey whitish and with the veins beyond the cell and towards the costa more or less indicated with blackish. The stigmata are small, grey whitish, the plical obliquely before the first discal, the discal connected by a blackish streak. The hindwings are rather dark grey.
