= Gelechia sachalinensis =

Scientific classification
- Kingdom: Animalia
- Phylum: Arthropoda
- Clade: Pancrustacea
- Class: Insecta
- Order: Lepidoptera
- Family: Gelechiidae
- Genus: Gelechia
- Species: G. sachalinensis

Binomial name
- Gelechia sachalinensis Matsumura, 1931

Species of moth

Gelechia sachalinensis is a moth of the family Gelechiidae. It was described by Shōnen Matsumura in 1931. It is found in Japan.
