= Gelechia hetaeria =

Scientific classification
- Kingdom: Animalia
- Phylum: Arthropoda
- Clade: Pancrustacea
- Class: Insecta
- Order: Lepidoptera
- Family: Gelechiidae
- Genus: Gelechia
- Species: G. hetaeria

Binomial name
- Gelechia hetaeria Walsingham, 1911

Species of moth

Gelechia hetaeria is a moth of the family Gelechiidae. It is found in Mexico (Veracruz).

The wingspan is about 15 mm. The forewings are rosy greyish fuscous, a black spot at the base of the costa and three elongate black spots, somewhat ill-defined, along the discal cell, with a small one beyond the end of the cell and a few black marginal spots around the apex. The hindwings are pale leaden grey.
