= Gelechia picrogramma =

Scientific classification
- Kingdom: Animalia
- Phylum: Arthropoda
- Clade: Pancrustacea
- Class: Insecta
- Order: Lepidoptera
- Family: Gelechiidae
- Genus: Gelechia
- Species: G. picrogramma

Binomial name
- Gelechia picrogramma Meyrick, 1929

Species of moth

Gelechia picrogramma is a moth of the family Gelechiidae. It was described by Edward Meyrick in 1929. It is found in Guyana and Amazonas, Brazil.
