= Gelechia omphalopis =

Scientific classification
- Kingdom: Animalia
- Phylum: Arthropoda
- Clade: Pancrustacea
- Class: Insecta
- Order: Lepidoptera
- Family: Gelechiidae
- Genus: Gelechia
- Species: G. omphalopis

Binomial name
- Gelechia omphalopis Meyrick, 1926

Synonyms
- Mometa omphalopis

Species of moth

Gelechia omphalopis is a moth of the family Gelechiidae. It is found in Namibia.
