= Gelechia anthochra =

Scientific classification
- Kingdom: Animalia
- Phylum: Arthropoda
- Clade: Pancrustacea
- Class: Insecta
- Order: Lepidoptera
- Family: Gelechiidae
- Genus: Gelechia
- Species: G. anthochra

Binomial name
- Gelechia anthochra Lower, 1896

Species of moth

Gelechia anthochra is a moth of the family Gelechiidae. It is found in Australia, where it has been recorded from Queensland and New South Wales.

The wingspan is about 16 mm. The forewings are pale ochreous-white, with dark fuscous markings. There is a short oblique mark on the costa near the base, a spot just beneath costa at one-fourth and a second larger, obliquely beneath and before it. A third is smaller, and placed obliquely beneath and beyond the first and a fourth is very small, immediately above the third. A fifth is similar to the fourth, and in a line with it, beyond the middle. There is also a suffused spot on the costa at three-fourths, emitting a row of very suffused spots around the apex to the hindmargin above the anal angle. The hindmarginal and apical area are more or less irregularly suffused with fuscous. The hindwings are greyish-fuscous.
