= Gelechia marmoratella =

Scientific classification
- Kingdom: Animalia
- Phylum: Arthropoda
- Clade: Pancrustacea
- Class: Insecta
- Order: Lepidoptera
- Family: Gelechiidae
- Genus: Gelechia
- Species: G. marmoratella

Binomial name
- Gelechia marmoratella Walker, 1864

Species of moth

Gelechia marmoratella is a moth of the family Gelechiidae. It is found in Australia, where it has been recorded from New South Wales.

Adults are white, the forewings speckled with black. These speckles are partly confluent and form an irregular band at the base, another in the middle, and a narrower and more irregular marginal band. The exterior border is slightly convex and very oblique. The hindwings are brownish cinereous.
