= Gelechia albomaculata =

Scientific classification
- Kingdom: Animalia
- Phylum: Arthropoda
- Clade: Pancrustacea
- Class: Insecta
- Order: Lepidoptera
- Family: Gelechiidae
- Genus: Gelechia
- Species: G. albomaculata

Binomial name
- Gelechia albomaculata Omelko, 1986

Species of moth

Gelechia albomaculata is a moth of the family Gelechiidae. It is found in the Russian Far East (Primorye) and China (Jilin).
