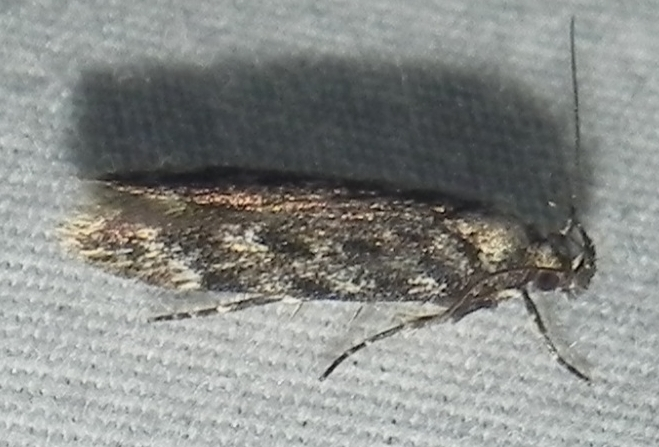

Scientific classification
- Kingdom: Animalia
- Phylum: Arthropoda
- Clade: Pancrustacea
- Class: Insecta
- Order: Lepidoptera
- Family: Gelechiidae
- Genus: Gelechia
- Species: G. versutella

Binomial name
- Gelechia versutella Zeller, 1873

= Gelechia versutella =

Species of moth

Gelechia versutella is a species of moth in the family Gelechiidae. It was first described by Philipp Christoph Zeller in 1873. It is found in the United States, where it has been recorded from Montana and Wyoming to Texas and California.

The larvae feed on Populus species, including Populus fremontii and Populus tremuloides.
