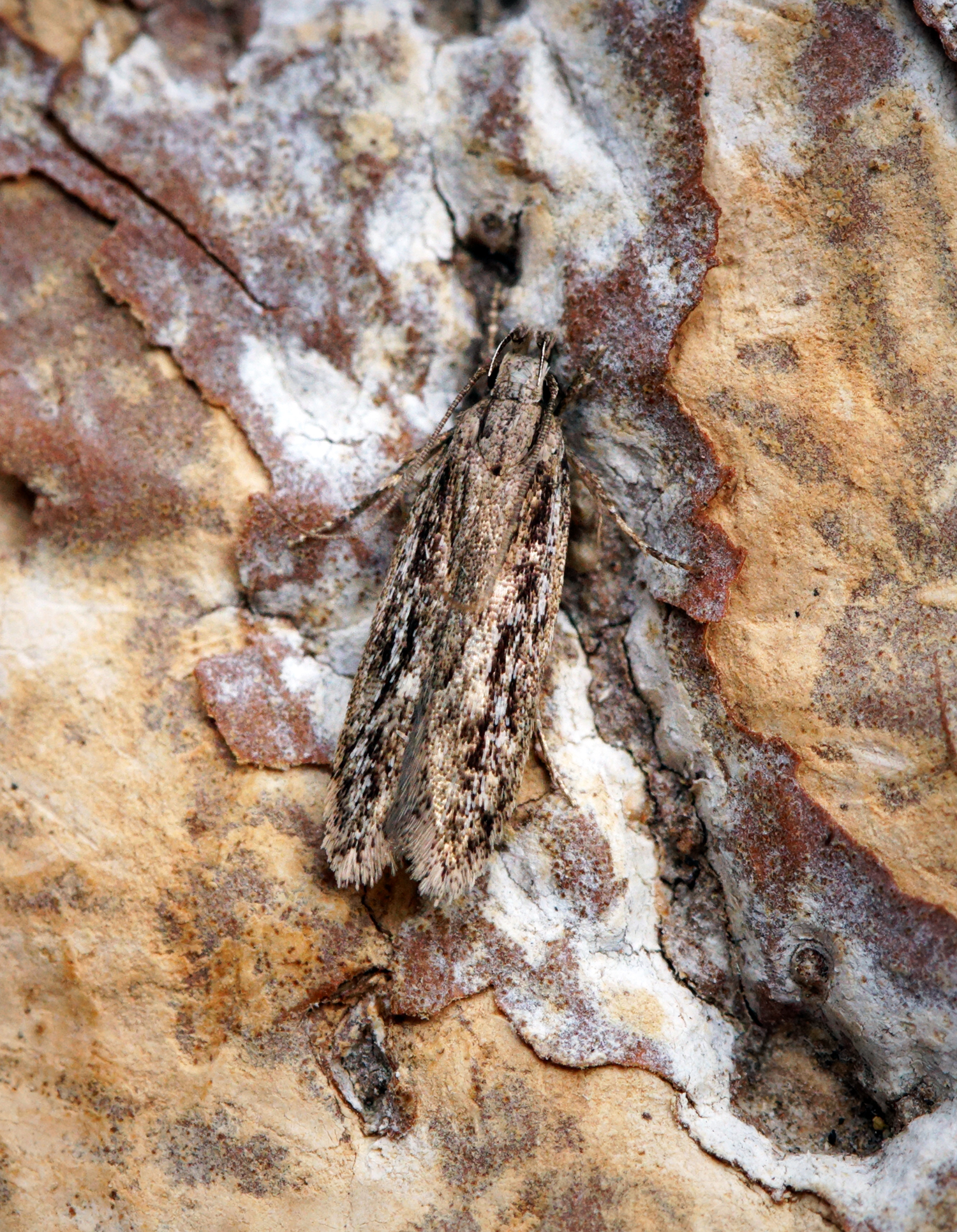

Scientific classification
- Kingdom: Animalia
- Phylum: Arthropoda
- Clade: Pancrustacea
- Class: Insecta
- Order: Lepidoptera
- Family: Gelechiidae
- Genus: Gelechia
- Species: G. senticetella

Binomial name
- Gelechia senticetella (Staudinger, 1859)

Synonyms
- Nothris senticetella Staudinger, 1859; Tinea senticetella; Hypsolophus obscuripennis Frey, 1880; Gelechia limitanella Rebel, 1904; Phthorimaea nigrostriella Zerny, 1935; Nothris obscuripennis f. melanotica Burmann, 1950; Nothris obscuripennis f. albicans Burmann, 1950

= Gelechia senticetella =

Species of moth

Gelechia senticetella, the cypress groundling, is a moth of the family Gelechiidae. It was described by Otto Staudinger in 1859. It is found in most of Europe, including Austria, Belgium, Bosnia and Herzegovina, Croatia, Cyprus, France, Germany, Greece, Hungary, Italy, North Macedonia, Sicily, Slovakia, Spain, Switzerland and Ukraine. It is thought to be an introduced species in Great Britain.

The wingspan is 10-13.5 mm. Adults have been recorded on wing from July to August.

The larvae feed on Juniperus communis, other Juniperus species and Thuja, Chaemocyparis and Cupressus species. They mine the leaves of their host plant, later living within a silken tube or tent.
