= Gelechia inferialis =

Scientific classification
- Kingdom: Animalia
- Phylum: Arthropoda
- Clade: Pancrustacea
- Class: Insecta
- Order: Lepidoptera
- Family: Gelechiidae
- Genus: Gelechia
- Species: G. inferialis

Binomial name
- Gelechia inferialis (Meyrick, 1918)

Synonyms
- Telphusa inferialis Meyrick, 1918

Species of moth

Gelechia inferialis is a moth of the family Gelechiidae. It is found in India (Bengal).

The wingspan is about 13 mm. The forewings are fuscous, sprinkled darker and with a suffused dark fuscous somewhat oblique streak from before one-third of the costa, reaching half across the wing, and another from two-thirds of the costa to the tornus, sending in the middle a short streak towards the apex. There are tufts near the dorsum before and beyond the middle, and two tufts transversely placed in the disc before the second transverse streak. There are several dark fuscous marginal dots towards the apex. The hindwings are grey, longitudinally paler and bluish-tinged in the disc.
