= Gelechia intermedia =

Scientific classification
- Kingdom: Animalia
- Phylum: Arthropoda
- Clade: Pancrustacea
- Class: Insecta
- Order: Lepidoptera
- Family: Gelechiidae
- Genus: Gelechia
- Species: G. intermedia

Binomial name
- Gelechia intermedia Braun, 1923

Species of moth

Gelechia intermedia is a moth of the family Gelechiidae. It is found in North America, where it has been recorded from California.

The wingspan is about 17 mm. The forewings are clothed with whitish scales which are very narrowly tipped with blackish over most of the wing area. Some aggregates of scales are more broadly black-tipped, forming scarcely defined darker patches: a patch along the extreme base of the costa, near the middle of the costa and at two-thirds of the costa. There is a small patch in the cell near the base, a larger diffuse scarcely defined patch beyond it, and another near the end of the cell. The apex of the wing is dusted with more deeply black-tipped scales. The hindwings are brownish, darker toward the margins.
