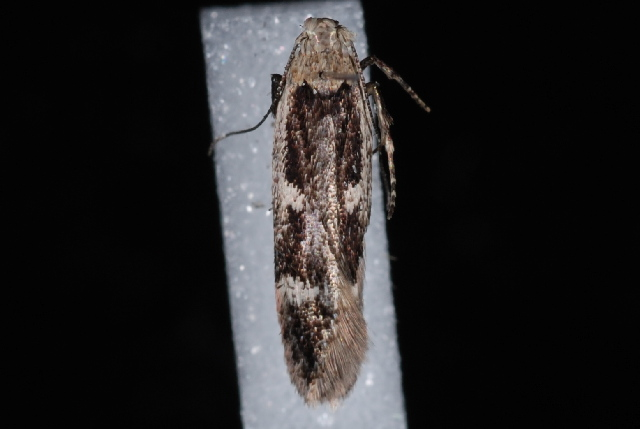

Scientific classification
- Kingdom: Animalia
- Phylum: Arthropoda
- Clade: Pancrustacea
- Class: Insecta
- Order: Lepidoptera
- Family: Gelechiidae
- Genus: Gelechia
- Species: G. dromicella

Binomial name
- Gelechia dromicella Busck, 1910

= Gelechia dromicella =

Species of moth

Gelechia dromicella is a moth of the family Gelechiidae. It is found in North America, where it has been recorded from British Columbia, California, Colorado, Oklahoma, Saskatchewan and Washington.

The wingspan is about 15 mm. The forewings are fuscous white, obscured by evenly overlaid dark fuscous scales. The extreme base of the costa is black and there is a black streak through the center of the wing from the base to the apical third, interrupted on the middle of the cell by a pure white spot. At apical third is a transverse, poorly defined, pure white fascia, hardly reaching either margin. Outside of this fascia the apical part of the wing is strongly suffused with blackish fuscous. The hindwings are iridescent whitish fuscous.
