= Gelechia lynceella =

Scientific classification
- Kingdom: Animalia
- Phylum: Arthropoda
- Clade: Pancrustacea
- Class: Insecta
- Order: Lepidoptera
- Family: Gelechiidae
- Genus: Gelechia
- Species: G. lynceella

Binomial name
- Gelechia lynceella Zeller, 1873

Synonyms
- Gelechia trilineella Chambers, 1877

Species of moth

Gelechia lynceella is a moth of the family Gelechiidae. It is found in North America, where it has been recorded from Alberta, British Columbia, California, Illinois, Indiana, Maine, Manitoba, Mississippi, Nevada, New York, North Dakota, Ohio, Ontario, Quebec, Texas and Wyoming.
