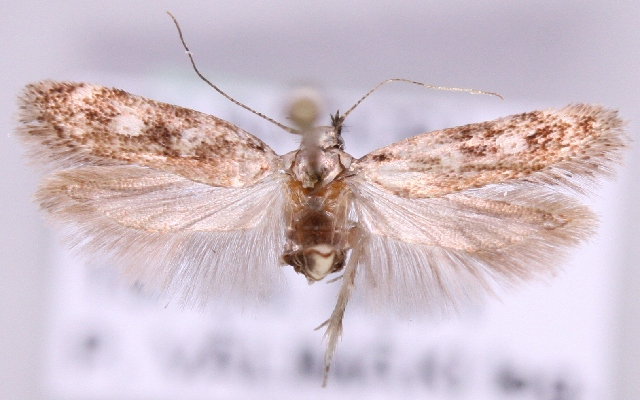

Scientific classification
- Kingdom: Animalia
- Phylum: Arthropoda
- Clade: Pancrustacea
- Class: Insecta
- Order: Lepidoptera
- Family: Gelechiidae
- Genus: Gelechia
- Species: G. sestertiella

Binomial name
- Gelechia sestertiella Herrich-Schäffer, 1854

= Gelechia sestertiella =

Species of moth

Gelechia sestertiella is a moth of the family Gelechiidae. It was described by Gottlieb August Wilhelm Herrich-Schäffer in 1854. It is found in Norway, Sweden, Finland, France, Germany, Denmark, Italy, Austria, Switzerland, the Czech Republic, Slovakia, Hungary, the Baltic region, Ukraine, Belarus and Russia.

The wingspan is 13–14 mm. Adults have been recorded on wing from July to August.

The larvae feed on Acer platanoides and Acer campestre.
