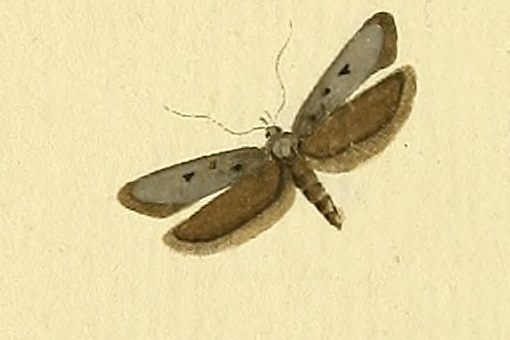

Scientific classification
- Kingdom: Animalia
- Phylum: Arthropoda
- Clade: Pancrustacea
- Class: Insecta
- Order: Lepidoptera
- Family: Gelechiidae
- Genus: Gelechia
- Species: G. asinella

Binomial name
- Gelechia asinella (Hübner, 1796)

Synonyms
- Tinea asinella Hübner, 1796; Gelechia aurorella Frey, 1882

= Gelechia asinella =

Species of moth

Gelechia asinella is a moth of the family Gelechiidae. It is found in France, Germany, Austria, Switzerland, Italy, the Czech Republic, Slovakia, Slovenia, Serbia, Hungary, Romania and Poland, as well as on Corsica.

The wingspan is 16–17 mm.

The larvae have been observed feeding on Salix species.
