= Gelechia panella =

Scientific classification
- Kingdom: Animalia
- Phylum: Arthropoda
- Clade: Pancrustacea
- Class: Insecta
- Order: Lepidoptera
- Family: Gelechiidae
- Genus: Gelechia
- Species: G. panella

Binomial name
- Gelechia panella Busck, 1903

Species of moth

Gelechia panella is a moth of the family Gelechiidae. It is found in North America, where it has been recorded from Arizona and California.

The wingspan is about 20 mm. The forewings are uniformly bright brick red. At the end of the cell is a very indistinct blackish dot and at apical third is a still more indistinct very narrow oblique yellowish white fascia across the wing. No other markings are found, and those mentioned are easily overlooked. The hindwings are light silvery fuscous, darker and yellowish toward the apex.

The larvae feed on Arbutus and Arctostaphylos species.
