= Gelechia traducella =

Scientific classification
- Kingdom: Animalia
- Phylum: Arthropoda
- Clade: Pancrustacea
- Class: Insecta
- Order: Lepidoptera
- Family: Gelechiidae
- Genus: Gelechia
- Species: G. traducella

Binomial name
- Gelechia traducella Busck, 1914

Species of moth

Gelechia traducella is a moth of the family Gelechiidae. It was described by August Busck in 1914. It is found in Panama and Brazil.

The wingspan is about 12 mm. The forewings are black with a light yellow, oblique fascia from the basal fourth of the costa to the basal third of the dorsum and with a spot of the same colour on the apical fourth of the costa. The hindwings are blackish fuscous.
