= Gelechia flexurella =

Scientific classification
- Kingdom: Animalia
- Phylum: Arthropoda
- Clade: Pancrustacea
- Class: Insecta
- Order: Lepidoptera
- Family: Gelechiidae
- Genus: Gelechia
- Species: G. flexurella

Binomial name
- Gelechia flexurella Clemens, 1860

Species of moth

Gelechia flexurella is a moth of the family Gelechiidae. It is found in North America, where it has been recorded from Pennsylvania.

The forewings are greyish fuscous, with a pale greyish band near the apex margined internally on the costa by a blackish-brown spot, with another of the same hue about the middle of the costa and another on the costa near the base. Near the base of the fold is a rather faint dark brownish spot, and the wing is sprinkled with dark brown atoms. The hindwings are dark fuscous.
