= Gelechia cuspidatella =

Scientific classification
- Kingdom: Animalia
- Phylum: Arthropoda
- Clade: Pancrustacea
- Class: Insecta
- Order: Lepidoptera
- Family: Gelechiidae
- Genus: Gelechia
- Species: G. cuspidatella

Binomial name
- Gelechia cuspidatella Turati, 1934

Species of moth

Gelechia cuspidatella is a moth of the family Gelechiidae. It is found in Libya.
