= Gelechia junctipunctella =

Scientific classification
- Kingdom: Animalia
- Phylum: Arthropoda
- Clade: Pancrustacea
- Class: Insecta
- Order: Lepidoptera
- Family: Gelechiidae
- Genus: Gelechia
- Species: G. junctipunctella

Binomial name
- Gelechia junctipunctella Caradja, 1920

Species of moth

Gelechia junctipunctella is a moth of the family Gelechiidae. It is found in Algeria.
