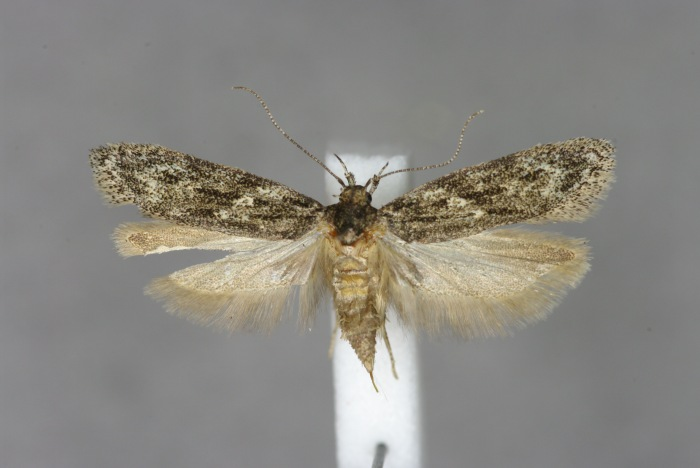
- Gelechia muscosella

Scientific classification
- Kingdom: Animalia
- Phylum: Arthropoda
- Clade: Pancrustacea
- Class: Insecta
- Order: Lepidoptera
- Family: Gelechiidae
- Genus: Gelechia
- Species: G. muscosella

Binomial name
- Gelechia muscosella Zeller, 1839

Synonyms
- Tinea neglectella Zincken, 1821; Gelechia muscosella var. griseella Caradja, 1920

= Gelechia muscosella =

Species of moth

Gelechia muscosella, the grey sallow groundling, is a moth of the family Gelechiidae. It is found in Europe (except the Mediterranean region). It is also found in the Caucasus, Siberia and the Russian Far East.

The wingspan is 14–18 mm.
