= Gelechia lactiflora =

Scientific classification
- Kingdom: Animalia
- Phylum: Arthropoda
- Clade: Pancrustacea
- Class: Insecta
- Order: Lepidoptera
- Family: Gelechiidae
- Genus: Gelechia
- Species: G. lactiflora

Binomial name
- Gelechia lactiflora Meyrick, 1921

Species of moth

Gelechia lactiflora is a moth of the family Gelechiidae first described by Edward Meyrick in 1921. It is found in Mozambique.

The wingspan is about 11 mm. The forewings are ochreous white with a black basal fascia occupying about one-sixth of the wing, confluent towards the costa with an oblique black fasciate patch from the costa, extending on the costa to two-fifths, and reaching two-thirds of the way across the wing. There is a transverse trapezoidal black blotch from the costa beyond the middle, widest beneath and connected with the preceding in the disc, the lower posterior angle projecting as a lobe nearly to the tornus and with a few blackish scales along the costa between this and the preceding. There are one or two black scales at the apex. The hindwings are whitish grey.
