= Gelechia veneranda =

Scientific classification
- Kingdom: Animalia
- Phylum: Arthropoda
- Clade: Pancrustacea
- Class: Insecta
- Order: Lepidoptera
- Family: Gelechiidae
- Genus: Gelechia
- Species: G. veneranda

Binomial name
- Gelechia veneranda Walsingham, 1911

Species of moth

Gelechia veneranda is a moth of the family Gelechiidae. It is found in Mexico (Sonora).

The wingspan is 16–17 mm. The forewings are mottled with much mixed colours, of which the ground-colour may be taken as pale stone-colour. On this is a profuse sprinkling and partial suffusion of fawn-brownish, with sundry spots and streaks almost black, or at least very dark fuscous. Of these, two are costal, one before and one beyond the middle, and two are discal, parallel to the costal, but a little further removed from the base. The terminal and apical portion of the wing is almost entirely suffused with this dark brownish fuscous shading, and the fold is marked by a narrow line of the same throughout. All the different shades are much blended together and ill-defined, a slight rufous tinge prevailing above the fold. The hindwings are brownish grey, profusely irrorated with brownish scales beyond the basal third.
