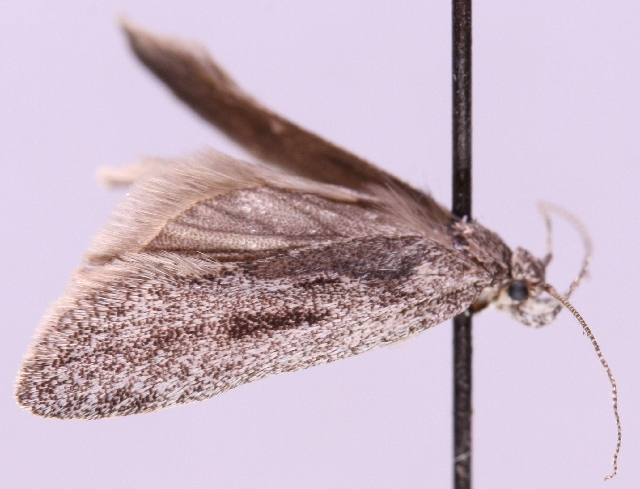

Scientific classification
- Kingdom: Animalia
- Phylum: Arthropoda
- Clade: Pancrustacea
- Class: Insecta
- Order: Lepidoptera
- Family: Gelechiidae
- Genus: Chionodes
- Species: C. tragicella

Binomial name
- Chionodes tragicella (Heyden, 1865)

Synonyms
- Oecophora tragicella Heyden, 1865; Gelechia libidinosa Staudinger, 1871

= Chionodes tragicella =

Species of moth

Chionodes tragicella is a moth of the family Gelechiidae. It is found in the Netherlands, Belgium, France, Germany, Denmark, Switzerland, Austria, Slovenia, Italy, Hungary, Slovakia, the Czech Republic, Poland, Sweden, Finland and Russia. Outside of Europe, it has been reported from Transbaikal and Tuva.

The wingspan is 17–22 mm. Adults have been recorded on wing from May to July.

The larvae feed on Larix decidua. Larvae can be found from August to May of the following year.
