= Vactor Tousey Chambers =

American entomologist (1830–1883)

Vactor Tousey Chambers (commonly V. T. Chambers) (6 August 1830, Burlington, Kentucky – 7 August 1883, in Covington, Kentucky) was an American entomologist who specialized in Microlepidoptera. He along with James Brackenridge Clemens, was a pioneer in the study of these insects. He described many new species, with particularly many now placed in Gelechioidea.

== Works ==
January 1870 – paper on Tropaea luna
June 1871 – "A new species of Cemiostoma"
January 1870 – "The classification of the Tineidae"
