= Xyela minor =

Scientific classification
- Kingdom: Animalia
- Phylum: Arthropoda
- Clade: Pancrustacea
- Class: Insecta
- Order: Hymenoptera
- Family: Xyelidae
- Genus: Xyela
- Species: X. minor

Binomial name
- Xyela minor Norton, 1869

Synonyms
- Xyela luteopicta Cockerell, 1902; Xyela alni Rohwer, 1913; Xyela winnemanae Rohwer, 1913; Xyela errans Rohwer, 1913; Xyela dissimilis Rohwer, 1913; Xyela nevadensis Rohwer, 1913; Xyela coloradensis Rohwer, 1913

Species of sawfly

Xyela minor is a species of sawfly in the family Xyelidae. It is widespread in North America where it can be found from Quebec to Florida, and west to British Columbia and California. The larvae have widespread hosts, including: Pinus coulteri (Coulter pine), P. elliottii (slash pine), P. muricata (bishop pine), P. palustris (longleaf pine), P. ponderosa (ponderosa pine), P. sabiniana (gray pine), P. taeda (loblolly pine), and P. virginiana (Virginia pine).
