= Xyela bakeri =

Scientific classification
- Kingdom: Animalia
- Phylum: Arthropoda
- Clade: Pancrustacea
- Class: Insecta
- Order: Hymenoptera
- Family: Xyelidae
- Genus: Xyela
- Species: X. bakeri

Binomial name
- Xyela bakeri Konow, 1898

Synonyms
- Xyela negundinis Cockerell, 1907; Xyela salicis Rohwer, 1913; Xyela intrabilis MacGillivray, 1923

Species of sawfly

Xyela bakeri is a species of sawfly in the family Xyelidae. It is widespread in North America. It can be found from Quebec to Florida, and west to California, British Columbia, and Alaska. It has widespread hosts for its larvae, including Pinus elliottii, P. palustris (slash pine), P. ponderosa (ponderosa pine), P. sabiniana (gray pine), and P. virginiana (Virginia pine).
