= Xyela lunata =

Scientific classification
- Kingdom: Animalia
- Phylum: Arthropoda
- Clade: Pancrustacea
- Class: Insecta
- Order: Hymenoptera
- Family: Xyelidae
- Genus: Xyela
- Species: X. lunata

Binomial name
- Xyela lunata Burdick, 1961

Species of sawfly

Xyela lunata is a species of sawfly in the family Xyelidae. It is endemic to California. The host for the larvae is Pinus coulteri (Coulter pine) and P. sabiniana (gray pine).
