= Xyela californica =

Scientific classification
- Kingdom: Animalia
- Phylum: Arthropoda
- Clade: Pancrustacea
- Class: Insecta
- Order: Hymenoptera
- Family: Xyelidae
- Genus: Xyela
- Species: X. californica

Binomial name
- Xyela californica Rohwer, 1913

Species of sawfly

Xyela californica is a species of sawfly in the family Xyelidae. It is endemic to California.
