= Xyela alberta =

Scientific classification
- Kingdom: Animalia
- Phylum: Arthropoda
- Clade: Pancrustacea
- Class: Insecta
- Order: Hymenoptera
- Family: Xyelidae
- Genus: Xyela
- Species: X. alberta

Binomial name
- Xyela alberta (Curran, 1923)

Synonyms
- Neoxyela alberta Curran, 1923

Species of sawfly

Xyela alberta is a species of sawfly in the family Xyelidae. It is found in North America. Its hosts are Pinus contorla trees.

== Distribution ==
X. alberta has been found in both Canada (Alberta, British Columbia, Yukon) and the United States (Montana and Wyoming).
