= Xyela dodgei =

Scientific classification
- Kingdom: Animalia
- Phylum: Arthropoda
- Clade: Pancrustacea
- Class: Insecta
- Order: Hymenoptera
- Family: Xyelidae
- Genus: Xyela
- Species: X. dodgei

Binomial name
- Xyela dodgei Greenbaum, 1974

Species of sawfly

Xyela dodgei is a species of sawfly in the family Xyelidae. It is endemic to Florida. It is named for H. Rodney Dodge, collector of the type series.

Males measure 2.8 mm (0.11 in) and have black body.
