= Xyela alpigena =

Scientific classification
- Kingdom: Animalia
- Phylum: Arthropoda
- Clade: Pancrustacea
- Class: Insecta
- Order: Hymenoptera
- Family: Xyelidae
- Genus: Xyela
- Species: X. alpigena

Binomial name
- Xyela alpigena (Strobl, 1895)

Synonyms
- Pinicola alpigena Strobl, 1895; Xyela brunneiceps Rohwer, 1913; Xyela kamtshatica Gussakovskij, 1931; Xyela middlekauffi Burdick, 1961

Species of sawfly

Xyela alpigena is a species of sawfly in the family Xyelidae. The host plant for the larvae is Pinus strobus. It can be found in North America and Europe.

== Distribution ==
Recorded from northeastern North America (Québec, Ontario, New York), south to Maryland, west through the Midwest to Illinois, with occurrence in Colorado and Europe.
