= Xyela concava =

Scientific classification
- Kingdom: Animalia
- Phylum: Arthropoda
- Clade: Pancrustacea
- Class: Insecta
- Order: Hymenoptera
- Family: Xyelidae
- Genus: Xyela
- Species: X. concava

Binomial name
- Xyela concava Burdick, 1961

Species of sawfly

Xyela concava is a species of sawfly in the family Xyelidae. It is endemic to western North America and can be found in Utah, Nevada, and California. The host for the larvae is Pinus monophylla (single-leaf pinyon) and P. ponderosa (Ponderosa pine).
