= Xyela linsleyi =

Scientific classification
- Kingdom: Animalia
- Phylum: Arthropoda
- Clade: Pancrustacea
- Class: Insecta
- Order: Hymenoptera
- Family: Xyelidae
- Genus: Xyela
- Species: X. linsleyi

Binomial name
- Xyela linsleyi Burdick, 1961

Species of sawfly

Xyela linsleyi is a species of sawfly in the family Xyelidae. It occurs in western North America in British Columbia, Washington, Idaho, and California. The host for the larvae is Pinus ponderosa (Ponderosa pine).
