= Exoteleia burkei =

Scientific classification
- Domain: Eukaryota
- Kingdom: Animalia
- Phylum: Arthropoda
- Class: Insecta
- Order: Lepidoptera
- Family: Gelechiidae
- Genus: Exoteleia
- Species: E. burkei

Binomial name
- Exoteleia burkei Keifer, 1931

Species of moth

Exoteleia burkei, the Monterey pine shoot moth, is a moth of the family Gelechiidae. It is found in North America, where it has been recorded from California.

The wingspan is 8–10 mm.

The larvae feed on Pinus radiata, Pinus attenuata, Pinus coulteri and Pinus sabiniana.
