= Xyela deserti =

Scientific classification
- Kingdom: Animalia
- Phylum: Arthropoda
- Clade: Pancrustacea
- Class: Insecta
- Order: Hymenoptera
- Family: Xyelidae
- Genus: Xyela
- Species: X. deserti

Binomial name
- Xyela deserti Burdick, 1961

Species of sawfly

Xyela deserti is a species of sawfly in the family Xyelidae. It is endemic to North America. It can be found in Nevada and California. The host for the larvae is Pinus monophylla (single-leaf pinyon).
