= Xyela cheloma =

Scientific classification
- Kingdom: Animalia
- Phylum: Arthropoda
- Clade: Pancrustacea
- Class: Insecta
- Order: Hymenoptera
- Family: Xyelidae
- Genus: Xyela
- Species: X. cheloma

Binomial name
- Xyela cheloma Burdick, 1961

Species of sawfly

Xyela cheloma is a species of sawfly in the family Xyelidae. It is found in western North America in both Canada (British Columbia) and the United States (Idaho, Nevada, Washington, and Oregon). The host for the larvae is Pinus ponderosa (Ponderosa pine).
