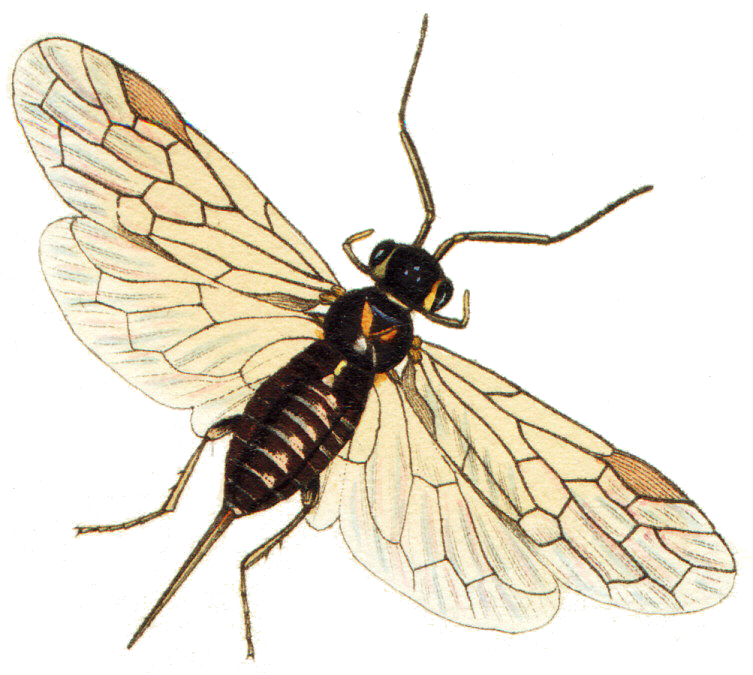
- Xyela julii, from British Entomology

Scientific classification
- Kingdom: Animalia
- Phylum: Arthropoda
- Clade: Pancrustacea
- Class: Insecta
- Order: Hymenoptera
- Family: Xyelidae
- Subfamily: Xyelinae
- Genus: Xyela; Dalman, 1819

Type species
- Xyela pusilla Dalman, 1819

Species
- See text

Synonyms
- Pinicola Brébisson, 1818 (preoccupied); Mastigocerus Latreille, 1818 (unavailable name); Tritokreion Schilling, 1826; Mastigocera Berthold, 1827; Neoxyela Curran, 1923; Xyelatana Benson, 1938; Magnixyela Rasnitsyn, 1971 (unavailable name); Alpigenixyela Rasnitsyn, 1971 (unavailable name); Desertixyela Rasnitsyn, 1971; Concavixyela Rasnitsyn, 1971; Linsleyixyela Rasnitsyn, 1971 (unavailable name); Minorixyela Rasnitsyn, 1971 (unavailable name)

= Xyela =

Genus of sawflies

Xyela is a genus of sawflies, belonging to the family Xyelidae.

The genus was described in 1819 by Dalman.

== Ecology ==
The genus has cosmopolitan distribution.

Larvae of most species of Xyela live and feed in the developing staminate cones of Pinus (Pine) species. One species, gallicaulis, forms shoot galls. Adults fly early in the spring and are commonly found in large numbers on the catkins of Salix (Willow) or Alnus (Alder) trees near their host plants.

== List of species ==
Subgenus Xyela

- Xyela alberta (Curran, 1923)
- Xyela altenhoferi Blank, 2013
- Xyela alpigena (Strobl, 1895)
- Xyela bakeri Konow, 1898
- Xyela brunneiceps Rohwer, 1913
- Xyela californica Rohwer, 1913
- Xyela cheloma Burdick, 1961
- Xyela concava Burdick, 1961
- Xyela curva Benson, 1938
- Xyela densiflorae Blank & Shinohara, 2005
- Xyela deserti Burdick, 1961
- Xyela dodgei Greenbaum, 1974
- Xyela exilicornis Maa, 1949
- Xyela fusca Blank, Kramp & Shinohara, 2017
- Xyela gallicaulis D.R. Smith, 1970
- Xyela graeca J.P.E.F. Stein, 1876
- Xyela heldreichii Blank, 2013
- Xyela helvetica (Benson, 1961)
- Xyela intrabilis MacGillivray, 1923
- Xyela japonica Rohwer, 1910
- Xyela julii (Brébisson, 1818)
- Xyela kamtshatica Gussakovskij, 1935
- Xyela koraiensis Blank & Shinohara, 2013
- Xyela linsleyi Burdick, 1961
- Xyela longula Dalman, 1819
- Xyela lugdunensis (Berland, 1943)
- Xyela lunata Burdick, 1961
- Xyela menelaus Benson, 1960
- Xyela meridionalis Shinohara, 1983
- Xyela middlekauffi Burdick, 1961
- Xyela minor Norton, 1869
- Xyela obscura (Strobl, 1895)
- Xyela occidentalis Blank & Shinohara, 2005
- Xyela par Blank & Shinohara, 2005
- Xyela peuce Blank, 2013
- Xyela pini Rohwer, 1913
- Xyela priceae Burdick, 1961
- Xyela pumilae Blank & Shinohara, 2013
- Xyela radiatae Burdick, 1961
- Xyela rasnitsyni Blank & Shinohara, 2013
- Xyela serrata Burdick, 1961
- Xyela sibiricae Blank, 2013
- Xyela sinicola Maa, 1947
- Xyela styrax Burdick, 1961
- Xyela tecta Blank & Shinohara, 2005
- Xyela uncinatae Blank, 2013
- Xyela ussuriensis Rasnitsyn, 1965
- Xyela variegata Rohwer, 1910
- †Xyela florissantensis Rasnitsyn, 1995
- †Xyela latipennis Statz, 1936
- †Xyela magna Statz, 1936
- †Xyela micrura Rasnitsyn, 1995

Subgenus Mesoxyela

- †Xyela mesozoica Rasnitsyn, 1965

Subgenus Pinicolites

- †Xyela graciosa (Meunier, 1920)
- †Xyela lata D.R. Smith, 1990
