= Exoteleia graphicella =

Scientific classification
- Domain: Eukaryota
- Kingdom: Animalia
- Phylum: Arthropoda
- Class: Insecta
- Order: Lepidoptera
- Family: Gelechiidae
- Genus: Exoteleia
- Species: E. graphicella

Binomial name
- Exoteleia graphicella (Busck, 1908)

Synonyms
- Gnorimoschema graphicella Busck, 1908

Species of moth

Exoteleia graphicella is a moth of the family Gelechiidae. It is found in North America, where it has been recorded from California.

The wingspan is about 13 mm. The forewings are white, with two broad, transverse brown fasciae. One nearly at the base of the wing, the other, which is nearly twice as broad, on the middle of the wing. Both are nearly straight edged and perpendicular on the edge of the wing, though the outer one is slightly concave exteriorly. Both fasciae contain black raised scales, which in the outer fascia form four small tufts, one pair at the basal edge and one pair near the apical edge. The extreme base of the costa is black and the tip of the wing is suffused with light brown and fuscous scales. The hindwings are whitish fuscous.
