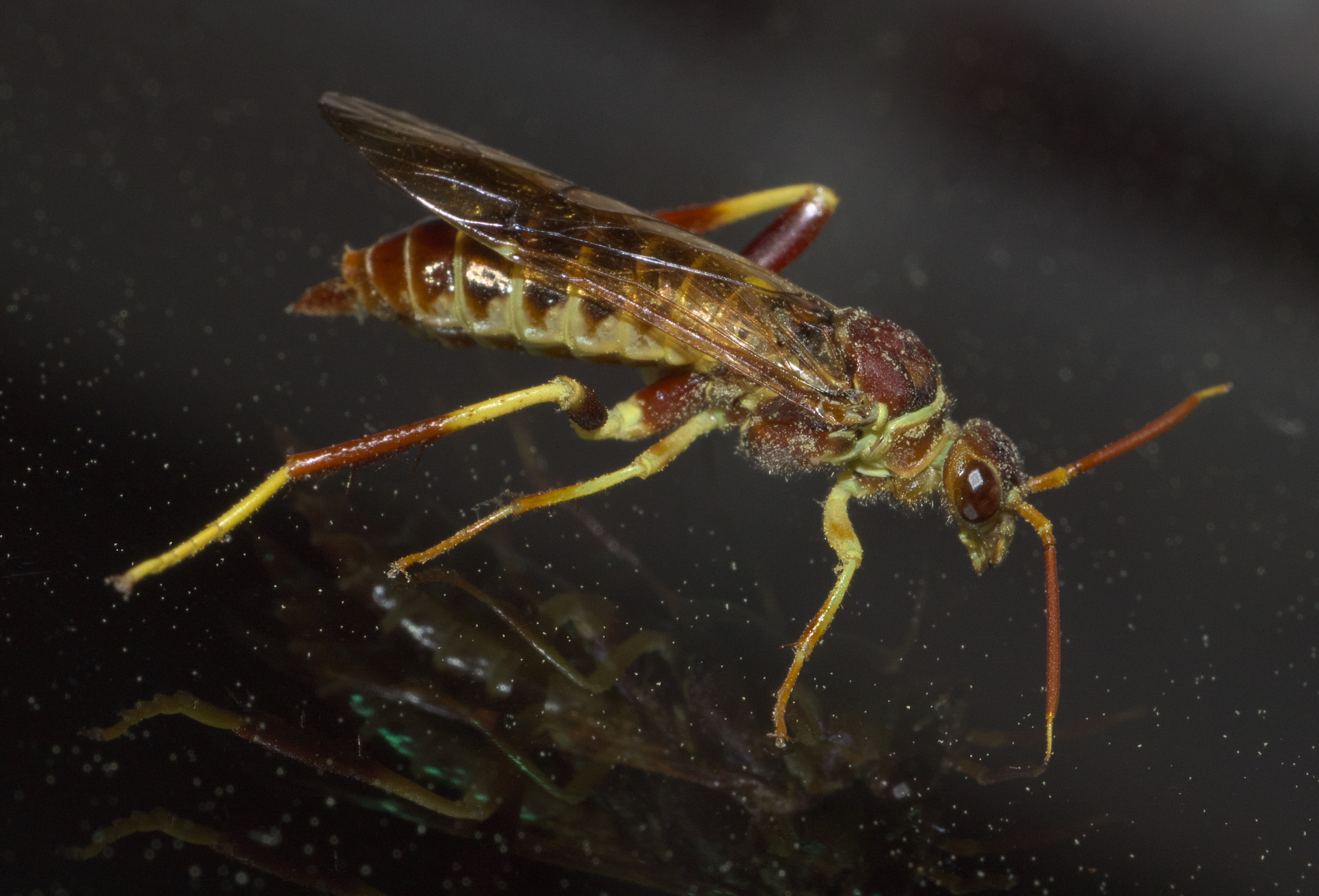
- Megaxyela major, Oklahoma

Scientific classification
- Kingdom: Animalia
- Phylum: Arthropoda
- Clade: Pancrustacea
- Class: Insecta
- Order: Hymenoptera
- Family: Xyelidae
- Subfamily: Macroxyelinae
- Genus: Megaxyela; Ashmead, 1898

= Megaxyela =

Genus of sawflies

Megaxyela is a genus of sawflies in the family Xyelidae. There are about 13 described species in Megaxyela, found in the eastern Nearctic and in the southeastern part of East Asia. Two fossil species have been discovered, in Colorado and Shandong, China.

Megaxyela are external feeders of trees in the walnut family, Juglandaceae.

== Species ==
These 13 species belong to the genus Megaxyela:

- Megaxyela bicoloripes (Rohwer, 1924)
- Megaxyela euchroma Blank, Shinohara & Wei, 2017
- Megaxyela fulvago Blank, Shinohara & Wei, 2017
- Megaxyela gigantea Mocsáry, 1909
- Megaxyela inversa Blank & D.R. Smith, 2017
- Megaxyela langstoni Ross, 1936, 2017
- Megaxyela major (Cresson, 1880)
- Megaxyela parki Shinohara, 1992
- Megaxyela pulchra Blank, Shinohara & Sundukov, 2017
- Megaxyela togashii Shinohara, 1992
- Megaxyela tricolor (Norton, 1862)
- † Megaxyela petrefacta Brues, 1908
- † Megaxyela yaoshanica Zhang, 1989
