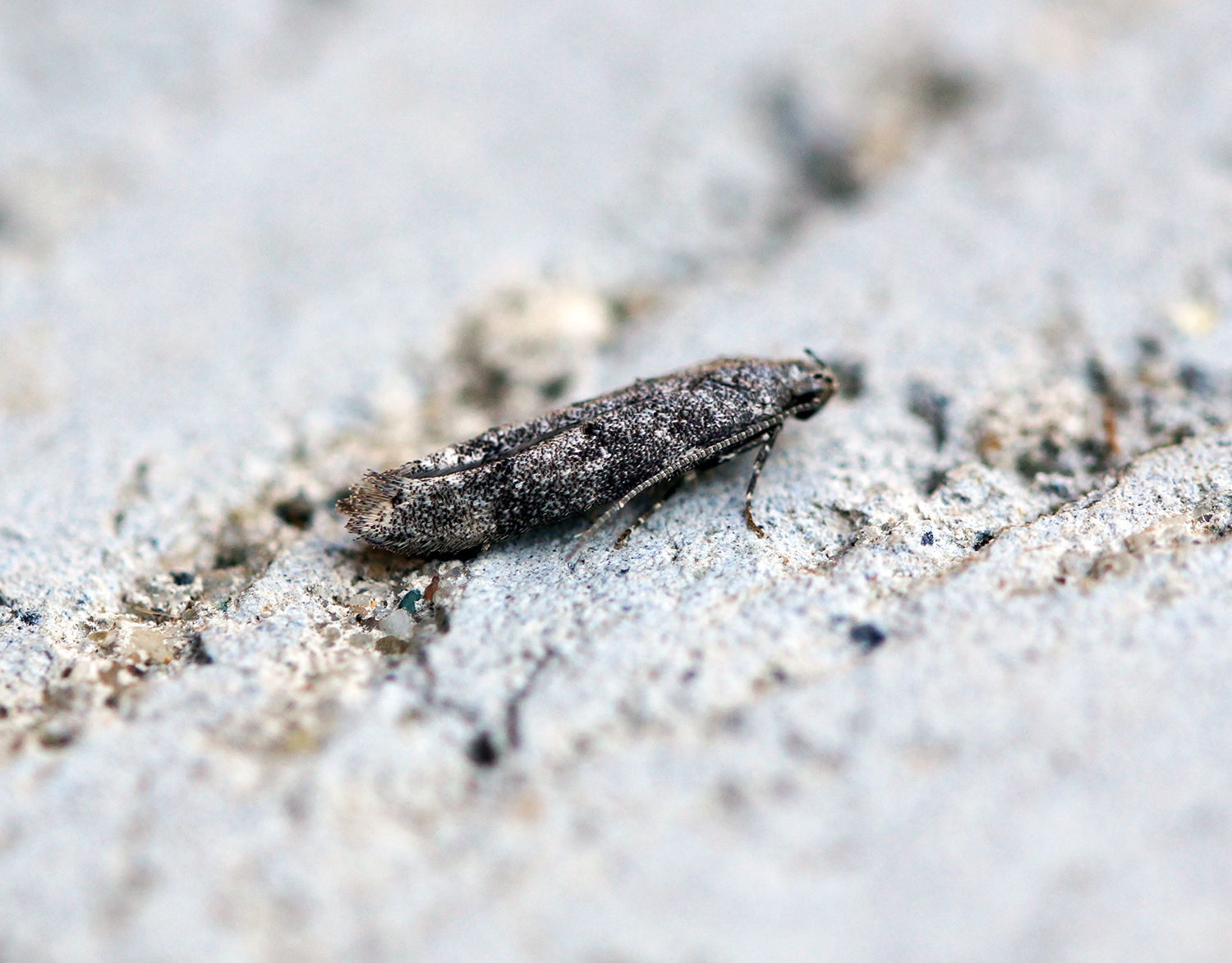

Scientific classification
- Kingdom: Animalia
- Phylum: Arthropoda
- Class: Insecta
- Order: Lepidoptera
- Family: Gelechiidae
- Genus: Exoteleia
- Species: E. dodecella

Binomial name
- Exoteleia dodecella (Linnaeus, 1758)

Synonyms
- Phalaena (Tinea) dodecella Linnaeus, 1758; Teleia dodecella; Tinea punctulata Fourcroy, 1758; Phalaena duodecimcristata Retzius, 1783; Recurvaria dodecea Haworth, 1828; Anacampsis annulicornis Stephens, 1834; Gelechia favillaticella Zeller, 1839; Phalaena reussiella Ratzeburg, 1840

= Exoteleia dodecella =

Species of moth

Exoteleia dodecella, the pine bud moth, is a moth of the family Gelechiidae. It is widely distributed from western Europe to Siberia. It is an introduced species in North America.

The wingspan is 9–15 mm. The head is grey, face whitish. Terminal joint of palpi as long as second. Forewings are whitish, densely irrorated with dark fuscous, appearing grey; indistinct broad darker fasciae at 1/3 and 2/3 a black basal dot, and a dash beneath costa at 1/4; two black dots transversely placed in disc at 1/4; stigmata black, first discal above plical, another black dot below second discal; a fine indistinct whitish interrupted fascia at 3/4 : on undersurface a longitudinal patch of thinly set erect scales in disc. Hindwings 1, grey. The larva is brownish-flesh colour; dots black; head black-brown.

Adults are on wing from June to July.

The larvae feed on Larix europaeus, Pinus mugo and Pinus sylvestris. Young larvae mine the needles of their host plant. Mining larvae can be found from September to March.
