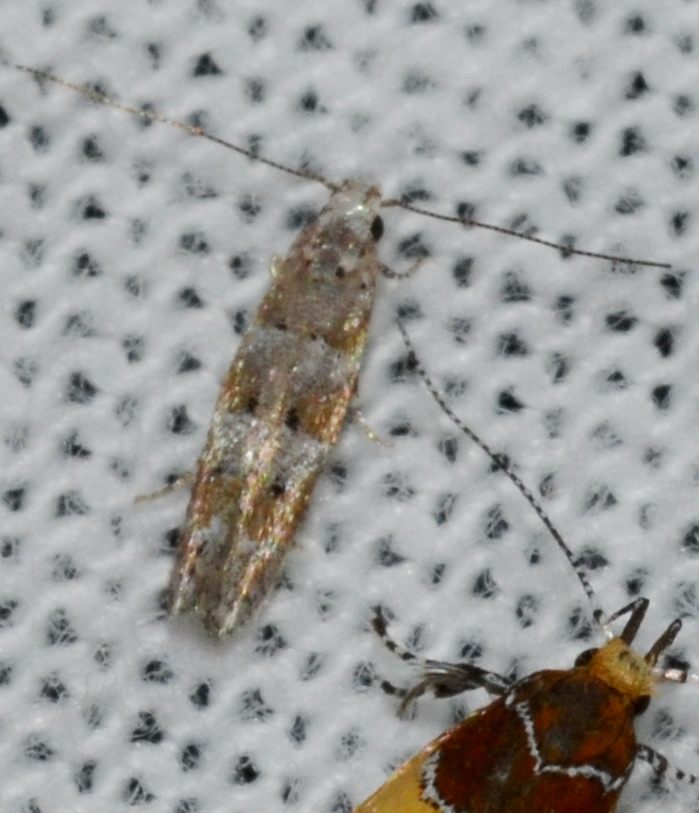
- Adult

Scientific classification
- Kingdom: Animalia
- Phylum: Arthropoda
- Clade: Pancrustacea
- Class: Insecta
- Order: Lepidoptera
- Family: Gelechiidae
- Genus: Exoteleia
- Species: E. pinifoliella

Binomial name
- Exoteleia pinifoliella (Chambers, 1880)

Synonyms
- Gelechia pinifoliella Chambers, 1880

= Exoteleia pinifoliella =

Species of moth

Exoteleia pinifoliella (pine needleminer) is a moth of the family Gelechiidae. It is found in eastern North America.

The forewings are brownish yellow flecked with fuscous scales and with three white fascia, placed about the basal fourth, the middle and apical fourth of the wing-length. The apex is densely dusted with fuscous scales on a white ground and the dorsal margin sparsely flecked with brown. The fascia are more or less margined with brown scales, and the third fascia is sometimes interrupted in the middle. The fuscous scales, which margin the first and second fascia especially near the fold along the second fascia, form minute tufts of raised scales. The hindwings are pale grayish. There is one generation per year.

The larvae feed on various hard pines, including jack pine and pitch pine. They mine needles and spend the winter in a mined needle. It bores into additional needles and changes into a pupa within its last mine.
