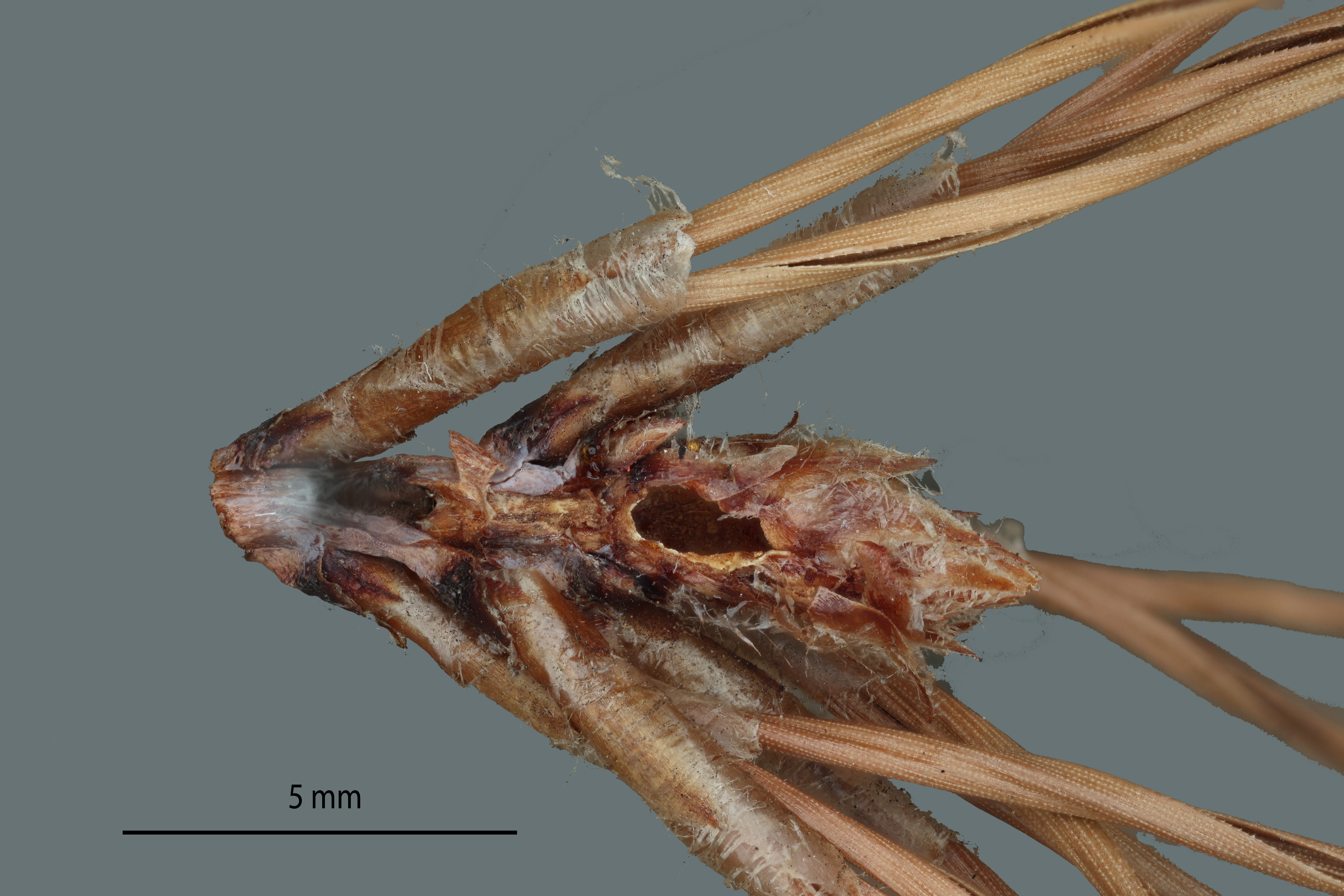
- Gall of Xyela gallicaulis
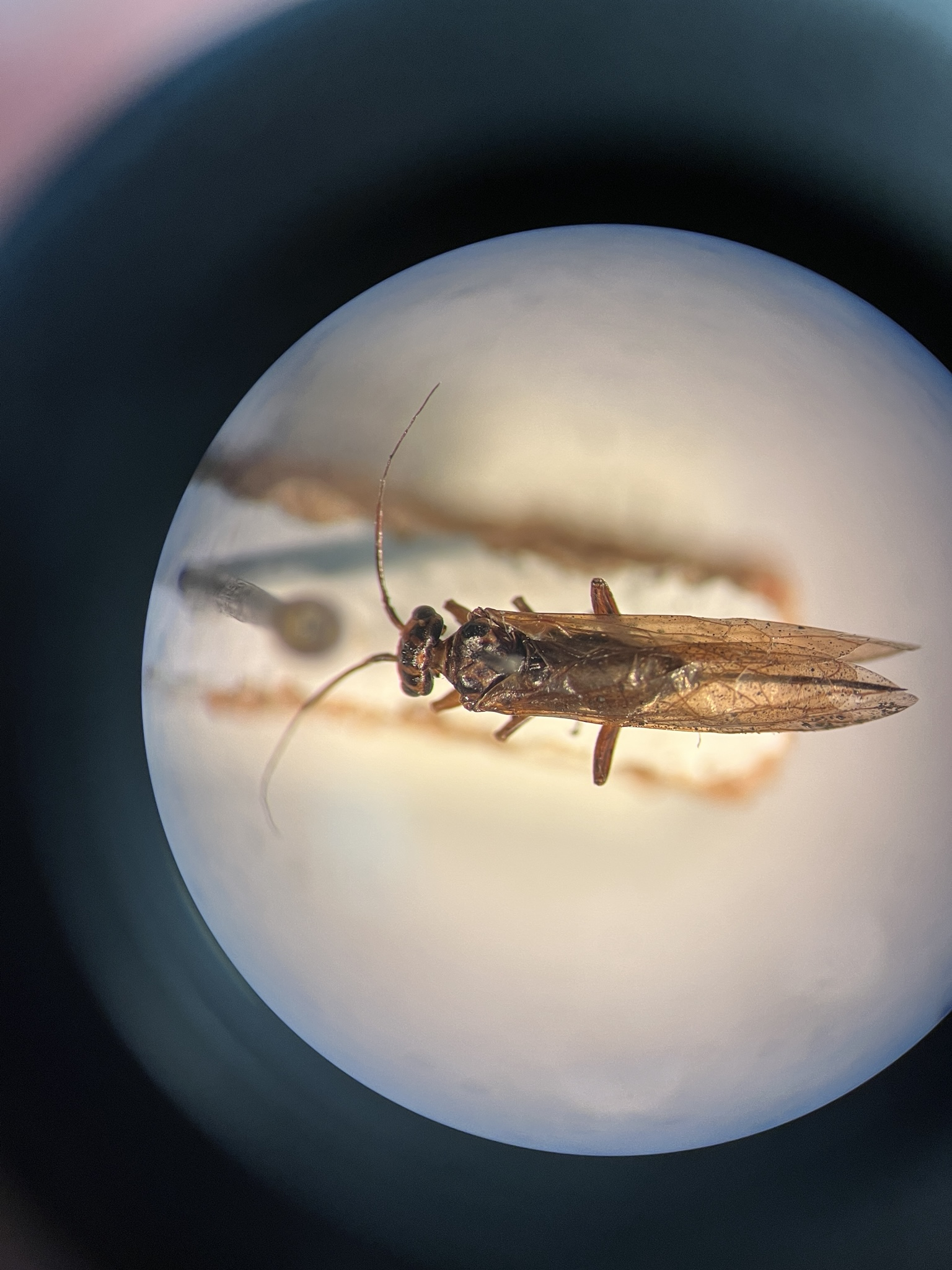
- Lateral habitus of Xyela gallicaulis

Scientific classification
- Kingdom: Animalia
- Phylum: Arthropoda
- Clade: Pancrustacea
- Class: Insecta
- Order: Hymenoptera
- Family: Xyelidae
- Genus: Xyela
- Species: X. gallicaulis

Binomial name
- Xyela gallicaulis Smith, 1970

= Xyela gallicaulis =

Species of sawfly

Xyela gallicaulis is a species of sawfly in the family Xyelidae. It is endemic to the southeastern United States and can be found in Virginia and Georgia. The larva feeds inside shoots and forms galls in its host which include: Pinus echinata (shortleaf pine), P. elliottii (slash pine), and P. taeda (loblolly pine), the last being the main host. It can cause damage to loblolly pine but is generally rare.
