= Exoteleia succinctella =

Scientific classification
- Kingdom: Animalia
- Phylum: Arthropoda
- Clade: Pancrustacea
- Class: Insecta
- Order: Lepidoptera
- Family: Gelechiidae
- Genus: Exoteleia
- Species: E. succinctella

Binomial name
- Exoteleia succinctella (Zeller, 1872)

Synonyms
- Gelechia succinctella Zeller, 1872 (preocc. Walker, 1864); Gelechia oribatella Rebel, 1918

Species of moth

Exoteleia succinctella is a moth of the family Gelechiidae. It is found in the Alps, on the Balkan Peninsula and in Bulgaria.

The wingspan is about 14 mm. The forewings are brownish-grey. The hindwings are light grey.

The larvae feed on Pinus mugo.
