= Exoteleia nepheos =

Scientific classification
- Domain: Eukaryota
- Kingdom: Animalia
- Phylum: Arthropoda
- Class: Insecta
- Order: Lepidoptera
- Family: Gelechiidae
- Genus: Exoteleia
- Species: E. nepheos

Binomial name
- Exoteleia nepheos Freeman, 1967

Species of moth

Exoteleia nepheos, the pine candle moth, is a moth of the family Gelechiidae. It is found in North America, where it has been recorded from southern Ontario and northern Ohio.

The wingspan is 9–11 mm. Adults are on wing from early July to early August in one generation per year.

The larvae feed on Pinus resinosa, Pinus sylvestris and Pinus mugo. .
