= Exoteleia anomala =

Scientific classification
- Kingdom: Animalia
- Phylum: Arthropoda
- Clade: Pancrustacea
- Class: Insecta
- Order: Lepidoptera
- Family: Gelechiidae
- Genus: Exoteleia
- Species: E. anomala

Binomial name
- Exoteleia anomala Hodges, 1985

Species of moth

Exoteleia anomala, the ponderoa pine needle miner, is a moth of the family Gelechiidae. It is found in the United States, where it has been recorded from Alabama, Louisiana, Mississippi, New Mexico and Arizona.

The length of the forewings is 4–5 mm. Adults are on wing from April to October.

The larvae feed on the needles of Pinus ponderosa.
