= Exoteleia =

Scientific classification
- Domain: Eukaryota
- Kingdom: Animalia
- Phylum: Arthropoda
- Class: Insecta
- Order: Lepidoptera
- Family: Gelechiidae
- Tribe: Litini
- Genus: Exoteleia; Wallengren, 1881

Synonyms
- Heringia Spuler, 1910; Heringiola Strand, 1917; Paralechia Busck, 1903

Genus of moths

Exoteleia is a genus of moths in the family Gelechiidae.

== Species ==
- Exoteleia anomala Hodges, 1985
- Exoteleia burkei Keifer, 1932
- Exoteleia californica (Busck, 1907) (Paralechia)
- Exoteleia dodecella (Linnaeus, 1758) (Phalaena)
- Exoteleia graphicella (Busck, 1903) (Gnorimoschema)
- Exoteleia ithycosma (Meyrick, 1914)
- Exoteleia nepheos Freeman, 1967
- Exoteleia pinifoliella (Chambers, 1880) (Gelechia)
- Exoteleia succinctella (Zeller, 1872) (Gelechia)

== Former species ==
- Exoteleia oribatella (Rebel, 1918) (Gelechia)
