= Exoteleia ithycosma =

Scientific classification
- Kingdom: Animalia
- Phylum: Arthropoda
- Class: Insecta
- Order: Lepidoptera
- Family: Gelechiidae
- Genus: Exoteleia
- Species: E. ithycosma

Binomial name
- Exoteleia ithycosma (Meyrick, 1914)

Synonyms
- Strobisia ithycosma Meyrick, 1914; Parelectroides ithycosma

Species of moth

Exoteleia ithycosma is a moth of the family Gelechiidae. It is found in Guyana.

The wingspan is about 10 mm. The forewings are dark fuscous with four blue-leaden-metallic transverse streaks, the first towards the base, rather thick, the second beyond one-third, slender, white on the costa, the third beyond the middle, not reaching the costa, interrupted below the middle, the fourth submarginal, slightly sinuate inwards below the middle. There is a white dot on the costa before two-thirds, edged beneath by a leaden-metallic dot, where a fine straight pale brownish line runs to the dorsum at three-fourths. There is a slender pale brownish streak along the termen. The hindwings are dark fuscous.
