= Exoteleia californica =

Scientific classification
- Domain: Eukaryota
- Kingdom: Animalia
- Phylum: Arthropoda
- Class: Insecta
- Order: Lepidoptera
- Family: Gelechiidae
- Genus: Exoteleia
- Species: E. californica

Binomial name
- Exoteleia californica (Busck, 1907)

Synonyms
- Paralechia californica Busck, 1907

Species of moth

Exoteleia californica is a moth of the family Gelechiidae. It is found in North America, where it has been recorded from California.

The wingspan is about 15 mm. The forewings are silvery white, with the extreme base of the costa black and with three ochreous oblique costal streaks edged with black, one of which is rather indistinct near the base, another on the middle of the wing more pronounced, and one at the apical third. These streaks terminate at about the middle of the wing, except the last, which runs across the wing. There are six conspicuous tufts of raised black scales in two longitudinal rows on the middle of the wing. The dorsal part of the wing is pure white, the apical overlaid with ochreous and black scales. The interval between it and the last costal streak appears as a narrow angulated white fascia. The hindwings are light fuscous.

The larvae feed on Quercus chrysolepis.
