= Chionodes sabinianus =

Scientific classification
- Kingdom: Animalia
- Phylum: Arthropoda
- Clade: Pancrustacea
- Class: Insecta
- Order: Lepidoptera
- Family: Gelechiidae
- Genus: Chionodes
- Species: C. sabinianus

Binomial name
- Chionodes sabinianus Powell, 1959

Synonyms
- Chionodes sabinianae

Species of moth

Chionodes sabinianus is a moth in the family Gelechiidae. It is found in North America, where it has been recorded from southern British Columbia to California.

The larvae feed on Pinus sabiniana, Pinus coulteri, Pinus ponderosa, Pinus radiata and Abies concolor.
