= Sievert Allen Rohwer =

American entomologist (1887–1951)

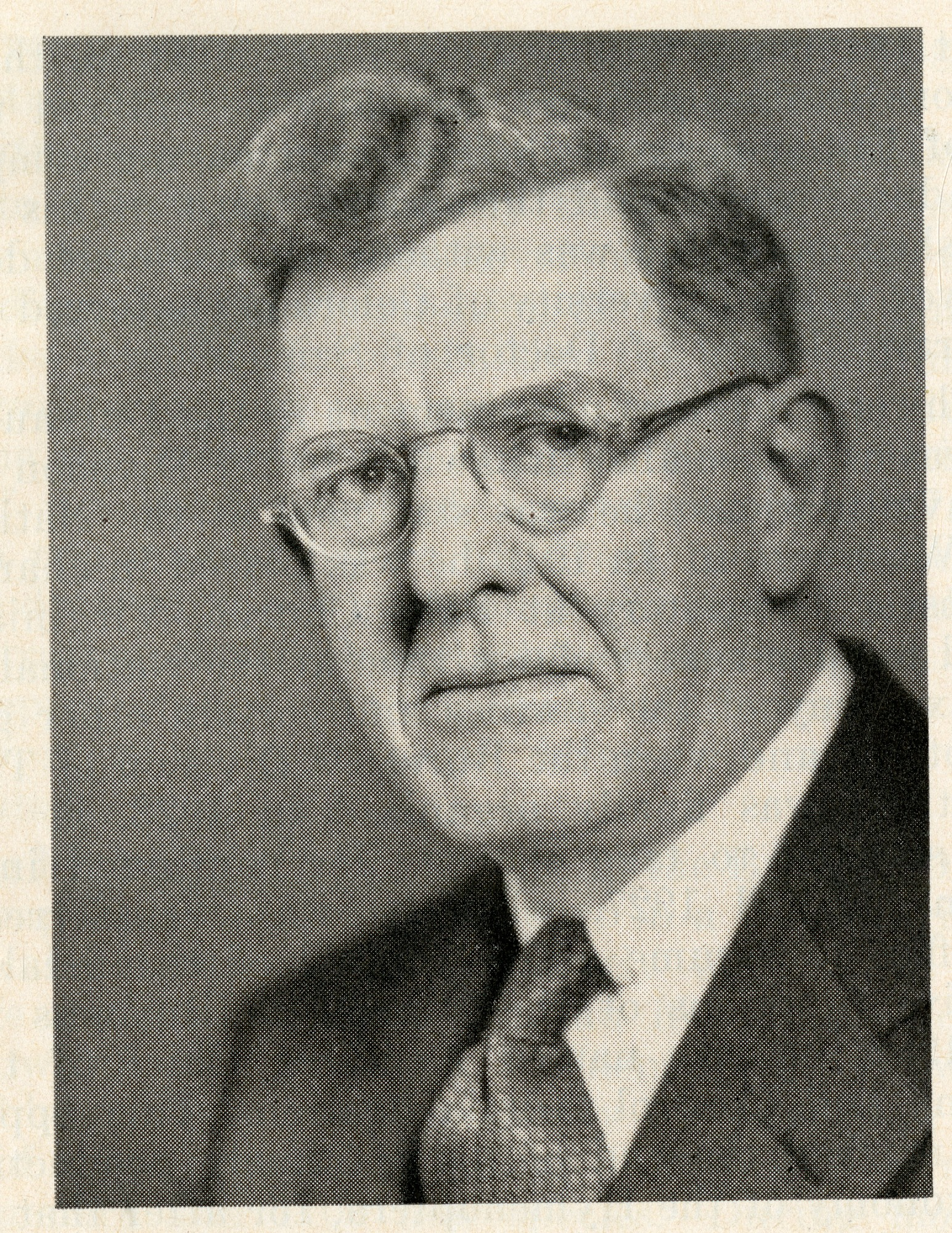
- Sievert Allen Rohwer (Smithsonian Institution Archive RU007323)
- Born: December 22, 1887; Telluride, Colorado
- Died: February 12, 1951 (aged 63); Washington, DC
- Occupation: Entomologist

Sievert Allen Rohwer (22 December 1887 in Telluride – 12 February 1951) was an American entomologist who specialized in Hymenoptera. He was a graduate of the University of Colorado. At the time of his death, Rohwer was serving as the Coordinator Defense Activities for the Agricultural Research Administration within the U.S. Department of Agriculture. Rohwer worked for the USDA from 1909 until his death.

Rohwer wrote Technical papers on miscellaneous forest insects. II. The genotypes of the sawflies or woodwasps, or the superfamily Tenthredinoidea. Technical series US Department of Agriculture, Bureau of Entomology, Washington, DC 20: 69–109 (1911) and many papers describing new species of Hymenoptera. His collection is held by the Smithsonian Institution Washington D. C.

His zoological author abbreviations is Rohwer.

== Selected publications ==
- United States. Office of Experiment Stations; S. A. Rohwer (1950), Plant quarantine import restrictions of the Republic of the Philippines, Washington, D.C.: U.S. Dept. of Agriculture, Agricultural Research Administration, Bureau of Entomology and Plant Quarantine, doi:10.5962/BHL.TITLE.122354, OCLC 793727733, Wikidata Q51398730
- S. A. Rohwer; United States. Bureau of Entomology (1933), Cutting costs of insect control, Washington, D.C.: United States Department of Agriculture, Bureau of Entomology and Plant Quarantine, doi:10.5962/BHL.TITLE.143640, OCLC 1012400668, Wikidata Q51417157
- S. A. Rohwer; William Middleton (1922). "North American sawflies of the subfamily Cladiinae". Proceedings of the United States National Museum. 60 (2396): 1–46. doi:10.5479/SI.00963801.60-2396.1. ISSN 0096-3801. Wikidata Q56208470.
- S. A. Rohwer (1921). "Some notes on wasps of the subfamily Nyssoninae, with descriptions of new species". Proceedings of the United States National Museum. 59 (2374): 403–413. doi:10.5479/SI.00963801.2374.403. ISSN 0096-3801. Wikidata Q56204719.
- S. A. Rohwer (1920). "The North American ichneumon-flies of the tribes Labenini, Rhyssini, Xoridini, Odontomerini, and Phytodietini". Proceedings of the United States National Museum. 57 (2317): 405–474. doi:10.5479/SI.00963801.57-2317.405. ISSN 0096-3801. Wikidata Q99661342.

== See also ==
- Taxa named by Sievert Allen Rohwer

== Sources ==
- Bradley, J. C. 1959 The influence of the American Entomological Society upon the study of Hymenoptera. Trans. Amer. Ent. Soc. 85(4).
- Mallis, A. 1971 American Entomologists.Rutgers Univ. Press New Brunswick 494–496. Portrait.
