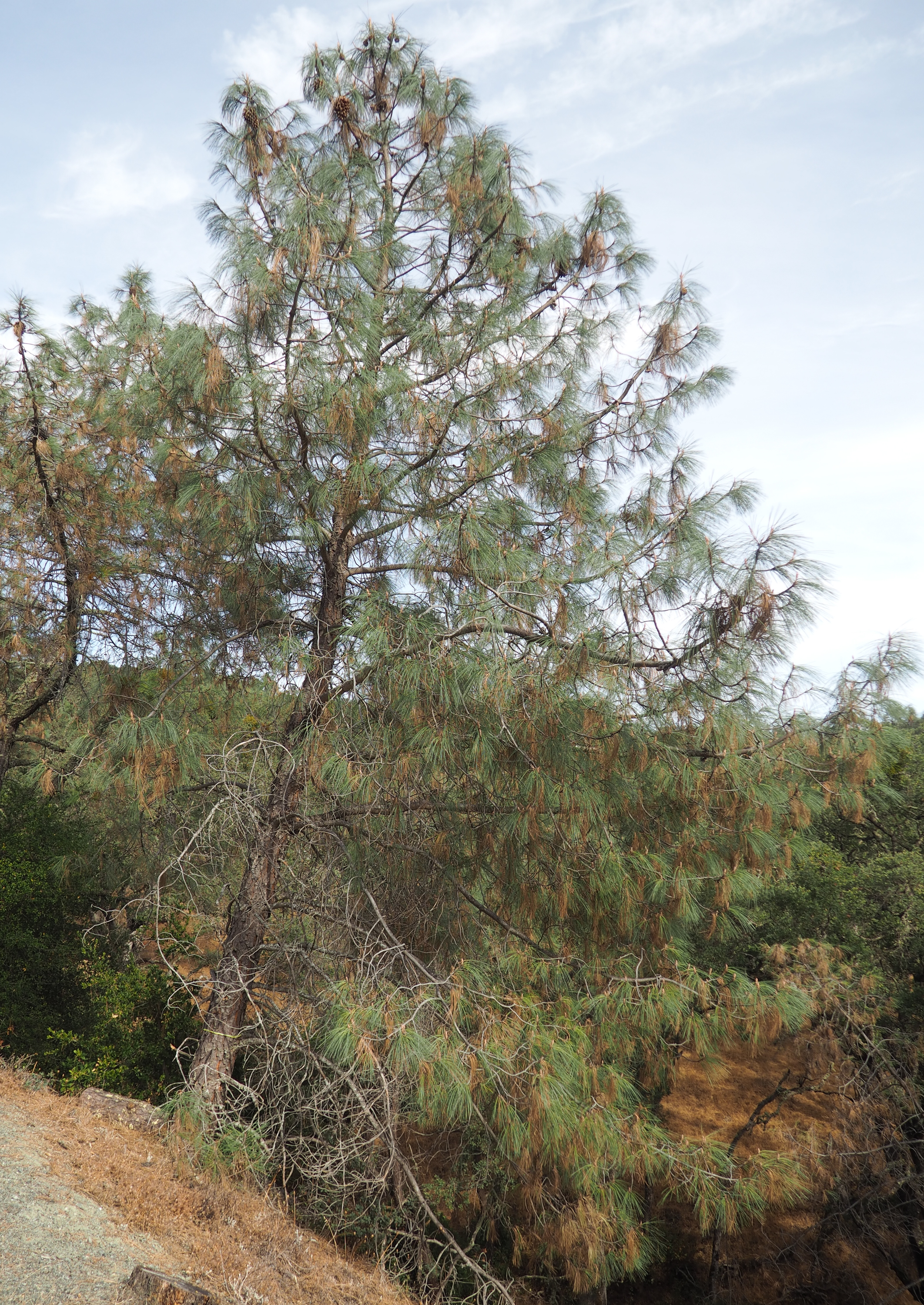

Conservation status
- Least Concern (IUCN 3.1)

Scientific classification
- Kingdom: Plantae
- Clade: Tracheophytes
- Clade: Gymnosperms
- Division: Pinophyta
- Class: Pinopsida
- Order: Pinales
- Family: Pinaceae
- Genus: Pinus
- Subgenus: P. subg. Pinus
- Section: P. sect. Trifoliae
- Subsection: P. subsect. Ponderosae
- Species: P. sabiniana

Binomial name
- Pinus sabiniana Douglas ex D.Don

= Pinus sabiniana =

Pine tree found in North America

Pinus sabiniana (sometimes spelled P. sabineana) is a pine endemic primarily to California, with its range extending locally into southern Oregon. Its vernacular names include towani pine, foothill pine, gray pine, ghost pine, and bull pine. The name digger pine was historically used but includes a racial slur.

== Description ==
Pinus sabiniana is a medium sized evergreen tree. Mature trees typically grow to 11–14 metres (36–45 ft), but can reach 32 m (105 ft). Young trees usually have straight trunks and a conical crown, but mature trees often divide into several forks as they age and become crooked, with sparse or irregular crowns. The bark of mature trunks is gray to reddish brown and is thick with deep fissures and irregular exfoliating scaly patches.

The needles are in fascicles (bundles) of three, distinctively pale gray-green, sparse and drooping, and grow to 20–30 centimetres (8–12 in) in length. The buds are ovoid, red-brown and resinous about 1cm long with white fringed scale margins.

The pollen cones are borne in clusters at the bases of new needle shoots. The seed cones mature during their second year and are large and heavy, broadly ovoid, 12–35 cm (4 3/4–13 3/4 inches) in length and almost as wide as they are long. Each cone scale bears a distinctive woody spur that commonly elongates and curves downward, giving an armored appearance. The cones lack an abscission layer and may remain attached to the original branch long after seeds have been dispersed. The seeds are large, 19-25mm, long, heavy and pooryl winged. When fresh, they weigh from 0.3 to 0.7 kilograms (0.7 to 1.5 lb), rarely over 1 kg (2.2 lb). The male cones grow at the base of shoots on the lower branches.

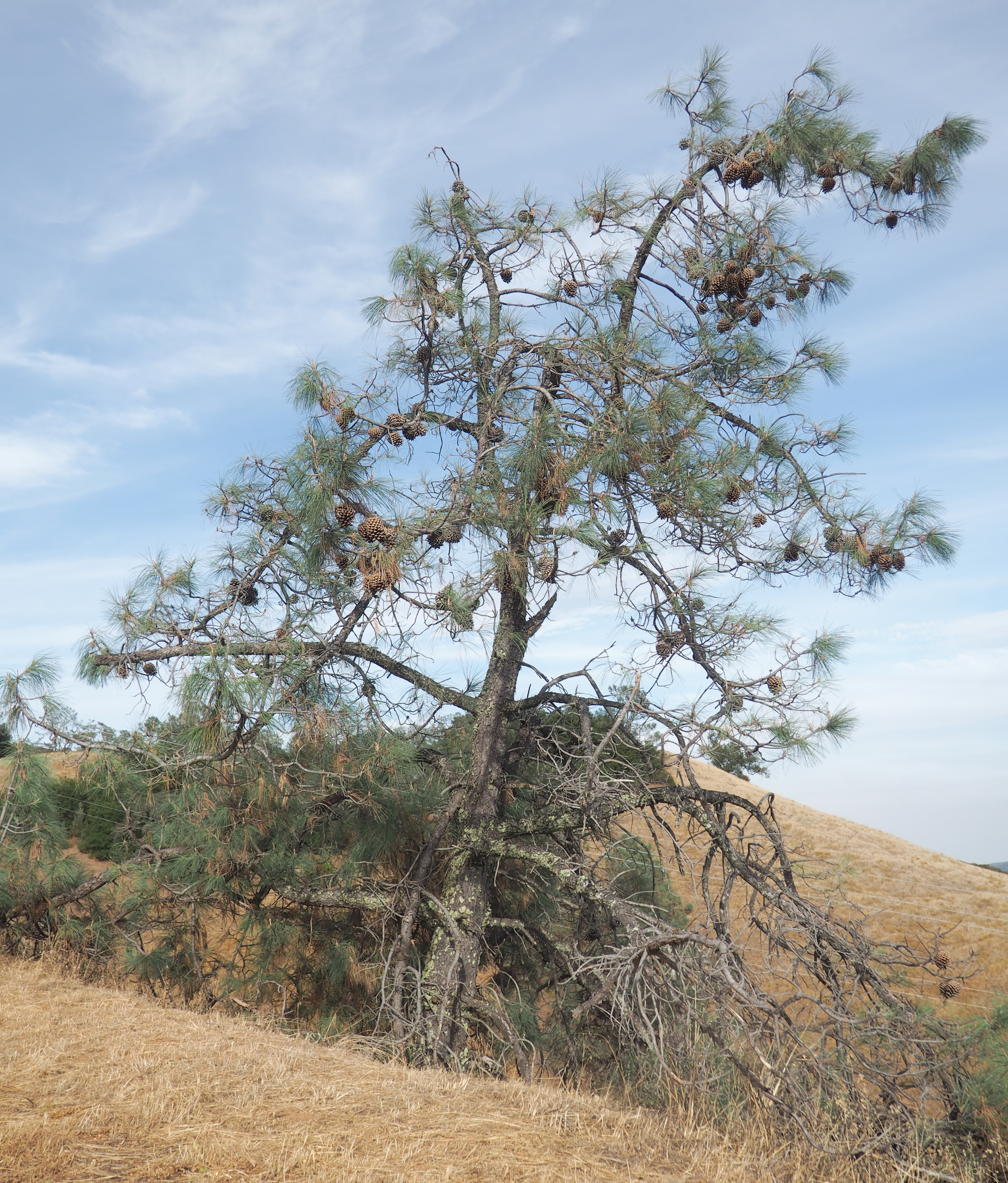
Older specimen with irregular crown and dead branches

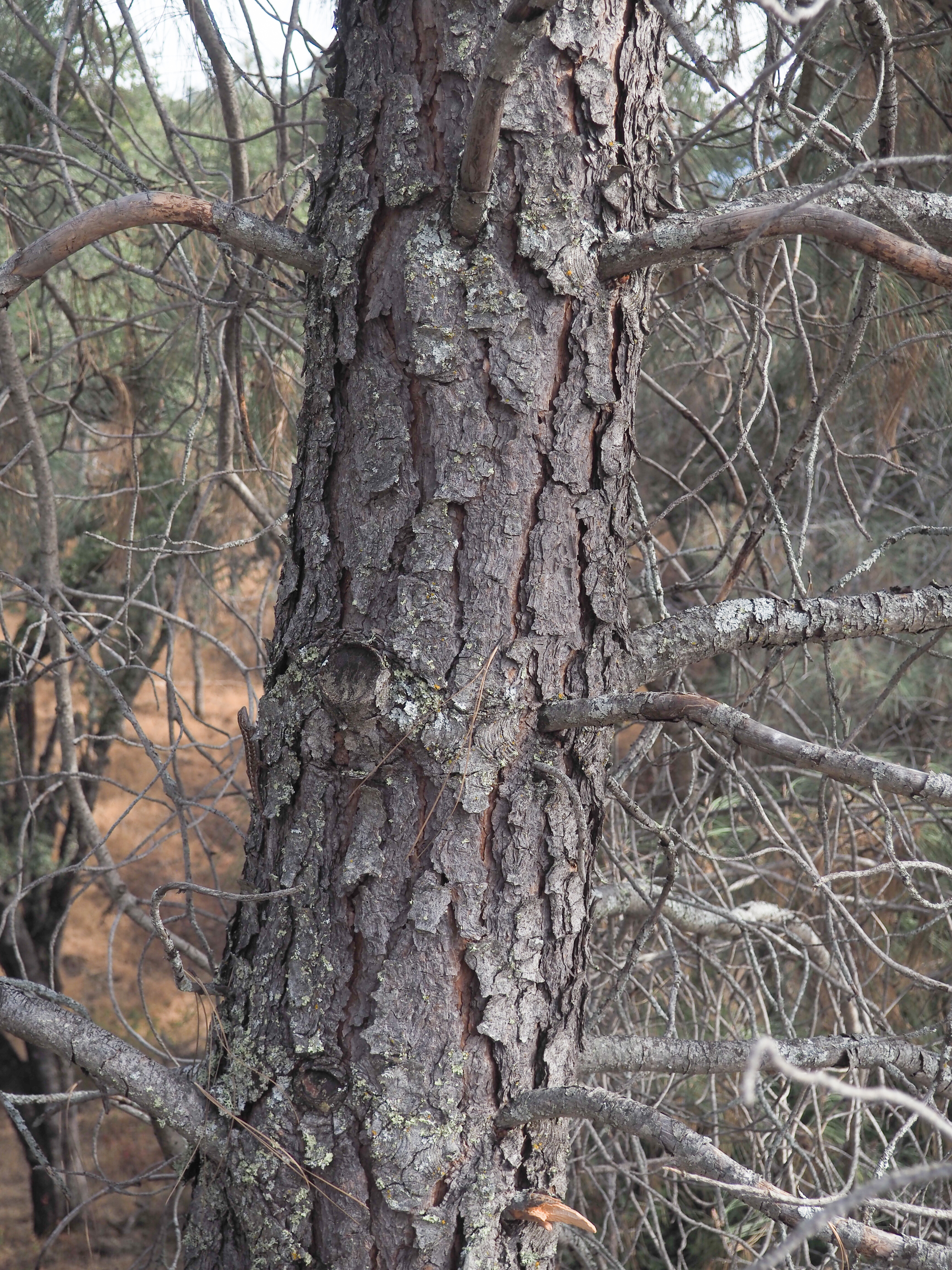
Deeply fissured, mature bark

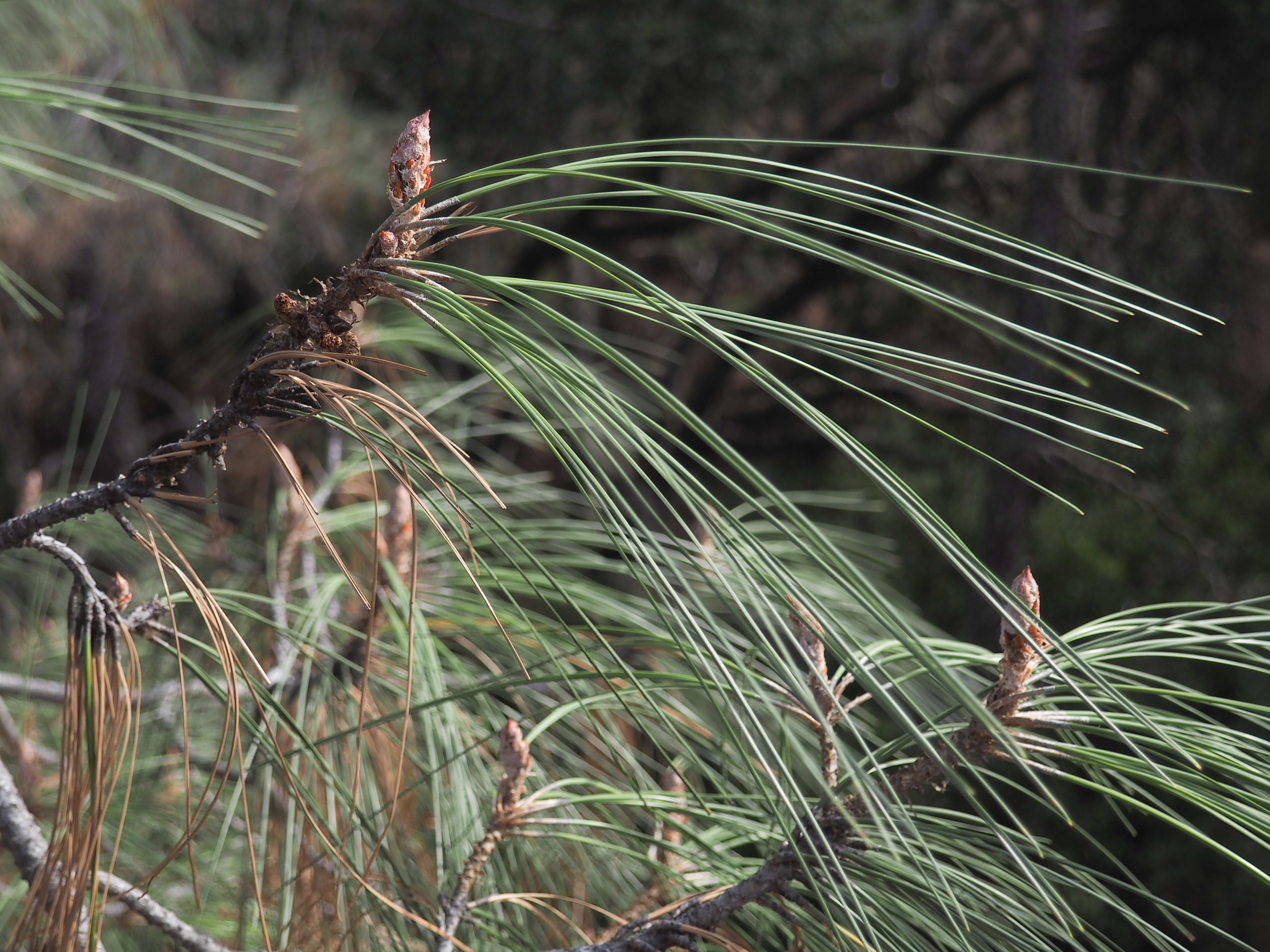
P. sabiniana needles where fascicles of three are clearly visible.

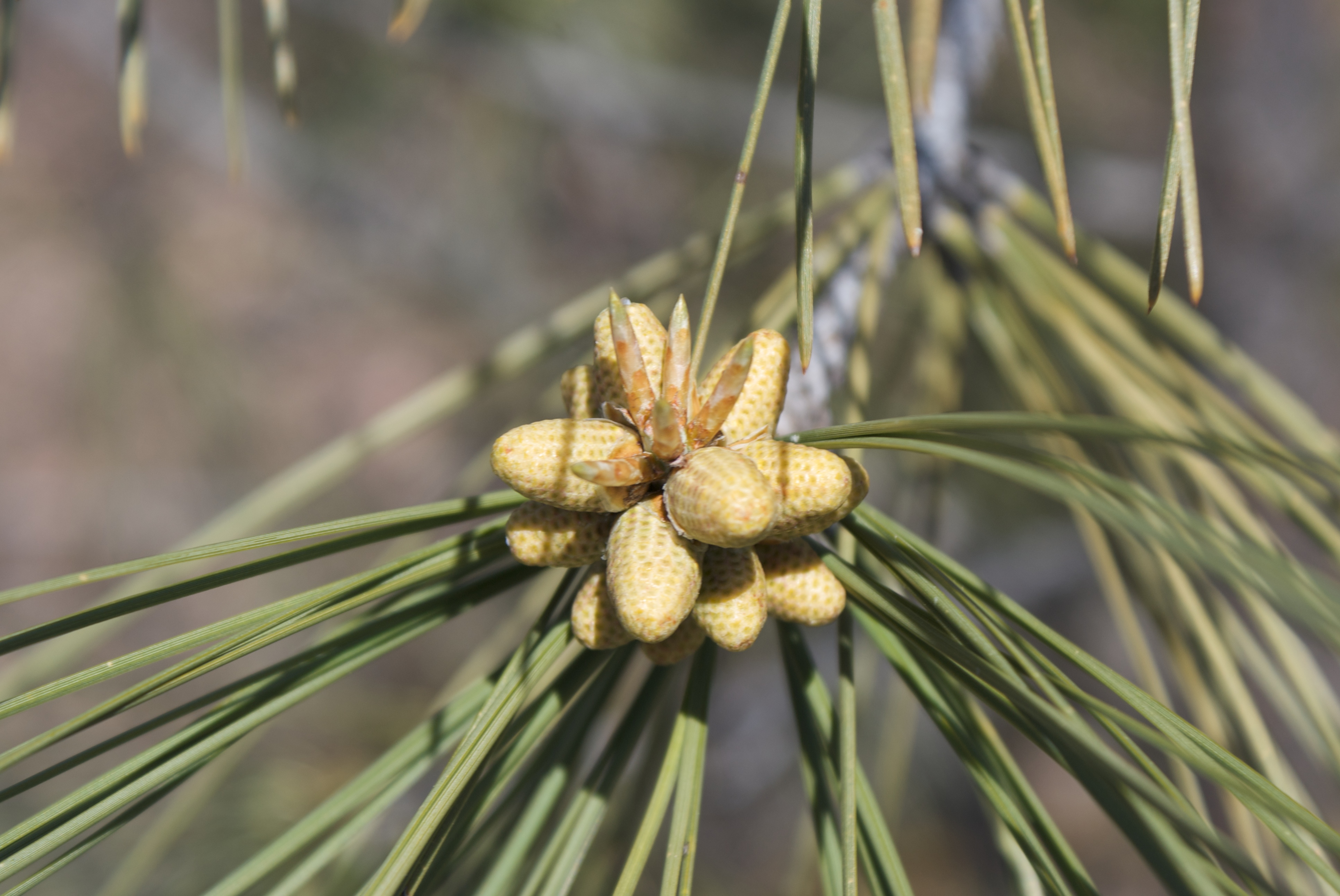
Pollen cones

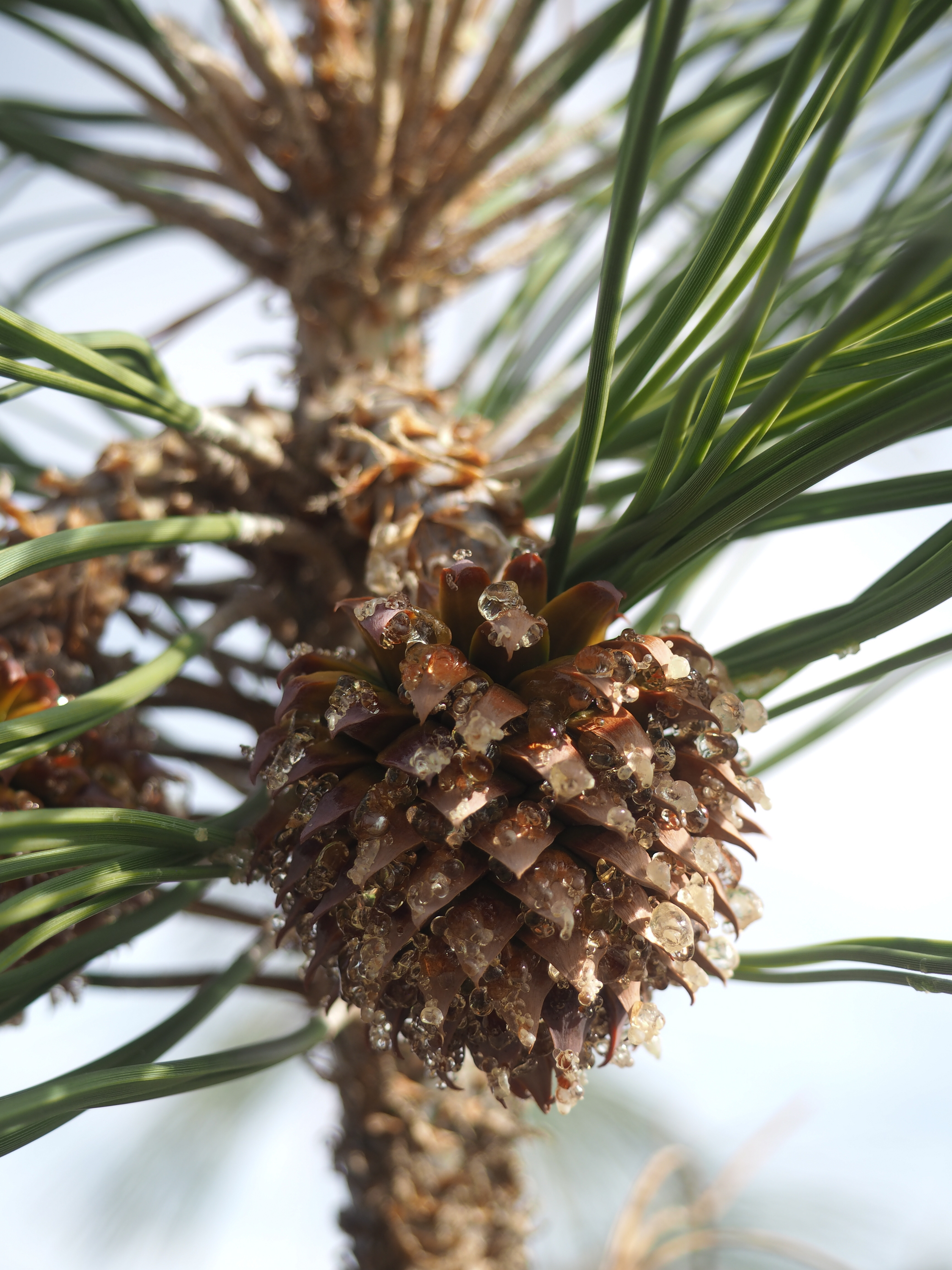
Developing seed cone extruding resin

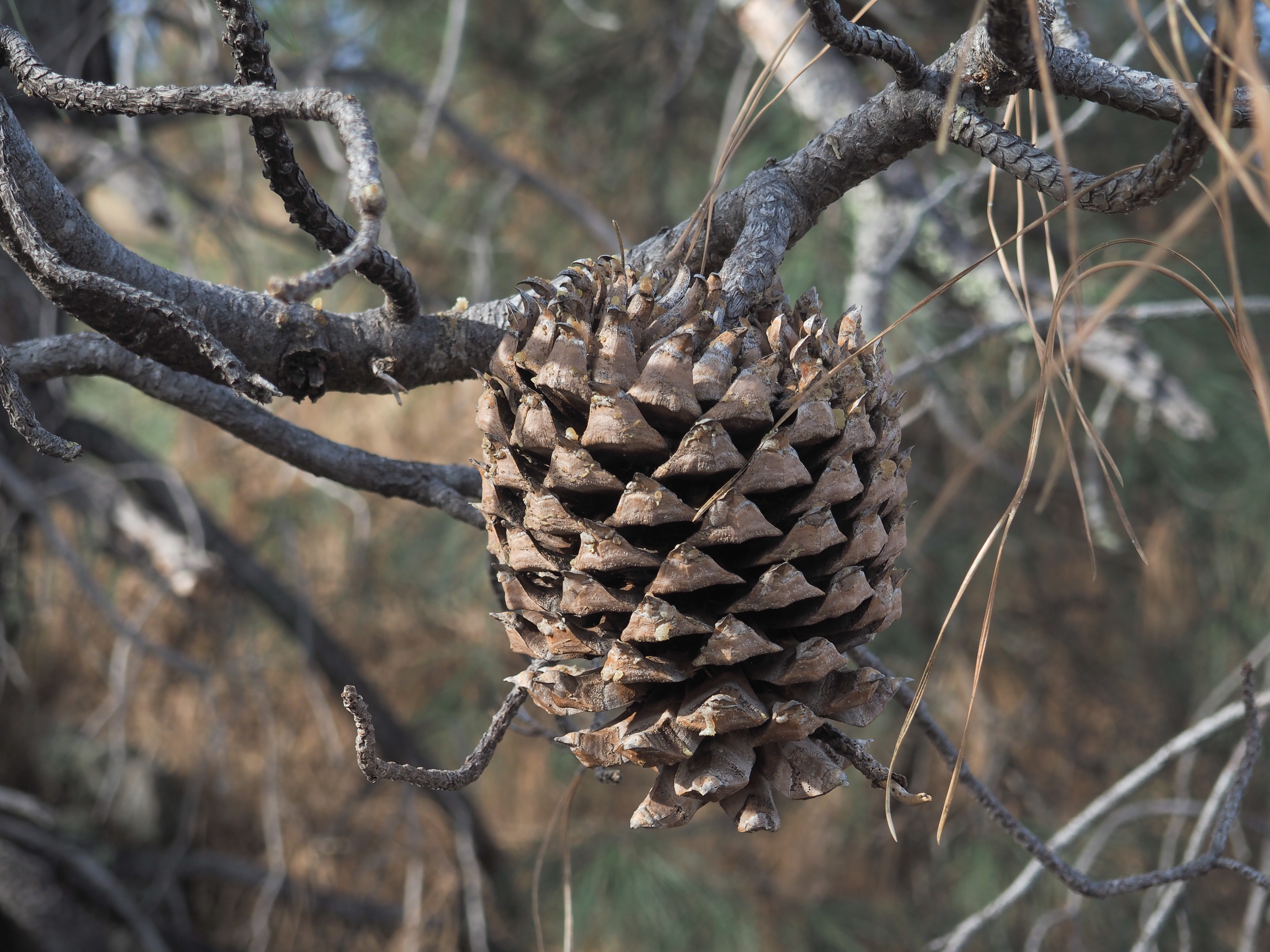
Mature seed cone showing woody spurs

== Taxonomy ==
=== Common name ===
The name digger pine supposedly came from the observation that the Paiute foraged for its seeds by digging around the base of the tree. It is more likely that the term was first applied to the people; "Digger Indians" was in common use in California literature from the 1800s. The historically more common name digger pine is still in widespread use. The Jepson Manual advises avoiding this name as the authors believe "digger" is pejorative in origin.

The tree is also sometimes thought of as a pinyon pine, though it does not belong to that group.

Pinus sabiniana in Californian languages
Language	Name
Achumawi	tujhalo
Awaswas Ohlone	hireeni (pine tree); saak (pinenut)
Chalon Ohlone	šaak (pinenut)
Chimariko	hatcho
Chochenyo Ohlone	saak (pinenut)
Chukchansi Yokuts	ton' (pinenut); shaaxal' (pine sap)
Karuk	axyúsip
Klamath	gapga
Konkow	tä-nē'
Maidu	towáni
Mono	tunah
Mutsun Ohlone	hireeni; saak (pinenut)
Patwin	tuwa; sanank (pinenut)
Rumsen Ohlone	xirren
Southern Sierra Miwok	sakky
Wappo	náyo
Wintu	xisi (unripe pinenut); chati (ripe pinenut)
Yana	c'ala'i

=== Botanical name ===
The scientific botanical name with the standard spelling sabiniana commemorates Joseph Sabine, secretary of the Horticultural Society of London. Some botanists proposed a new spelling sabineana, because they were confused with Latin grammar. The proposal has not been accepted by the relevant authorities (i.e. United States Department of Agriculture, The Jepson Manual or Germplasm Resources Information Network (GRIN). The GRIN notes that the spelling sabiniana agrees with a provision in the Vienna Code of the International Code of Botanical Nomenclature, the governing body of botanical nomenclature. In that code, recommendation 60.2C states that personal names can be Latinized in species epithets: 'Sabine' is Latinised to sabinius, with the addition of the suffix "-anus" (pertaining to) the word becomes sabiniana (In Latin, trees are feminine, irrespective if the word ends with a masculine suffix, i.e. pinus). The GRIN database notes that Sabine's last name is not correctable and therefore Pinus sabiniana is the proper name for the species.

== Distribution and habitat ==
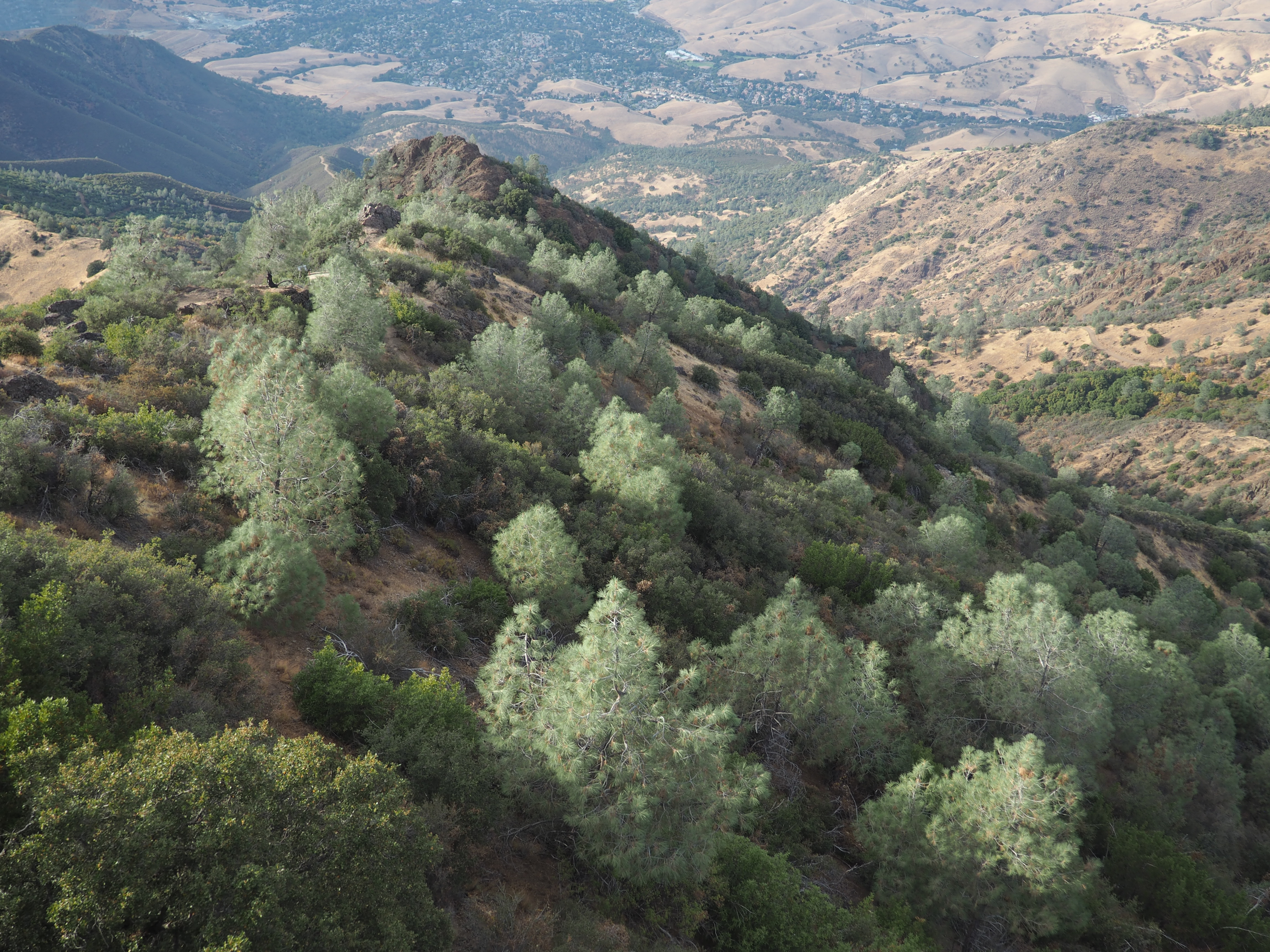
Pinus sabiniana growing on the dry slopes of Mount Diablo.

Pinus sabiniana is native primarily to California with scattered populations documented in southern Oregon. In California,It is found throughout the Sierra Nevada and Coast Ranges foothills that ring the Central, San Joaquin and interior valleys; the Transverse and Peninsular Ranges; and Mojave Desert sky islands.

This tree usually grows at elevations between sea level and 1,200 m (4,000 ft) and is common in the northern and interior portions of the California Floristic Province. It is adapted to long, hot, dry summers and is found in areas with an unusually wide range of precipitation: from an average of 250 mm (10 in) per year at the edge of the Mojave to 1,780 mm (70 in) in parts of the Sierra Nevada. It prefers rocky, well drained soil, but also grows in serpentine soil and heavy, poorly drained clay soils.

It commonly occurs in association with Quercus douglasii, and "Oak/Foothill Pine vegetation" (also known as "Oak/Gray Pine vegetation") is used as a description of a type of habitat characteristic within the California chaparral and woodlands ecoregion in California, providing a sparse overstory above a canopy of the oak woodland.

== Ecology ==
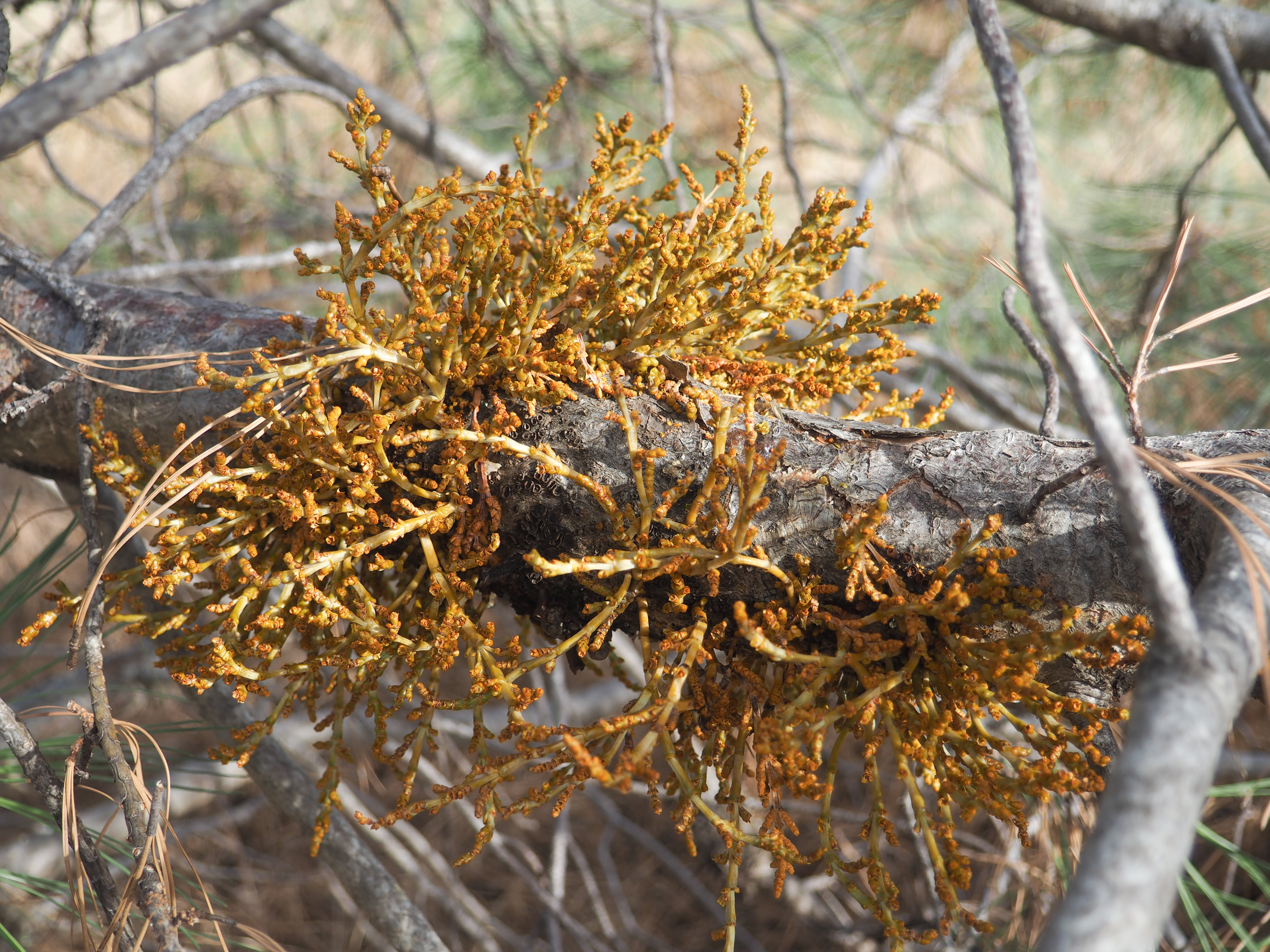
Arceuthobium occidentale is a mistletoe that parasitizes P. sabiniana.

Pinus sabiniana is a highly drought tolerant tree and very intolerant of shade. With its sparse crown and relatively low foliage mass, it reduces total water loss giving it a competitive advantage on dry sites, though it competes poorly in wetter environments with denser-crowned trees.

Its large, heavy seeds have poorly developed wings and are principally dispersed by animals and gravity rather than wind. California scrub jays and acorn woodpeckers disperse the seeds, while heavy, fallen cones may roll downslope and relatively buoyant seeds may be carried by running water.

Gray pine Dwarf Mistletoe ( Arceuthobium occidentale) is a widespread and sometimes harmful parasite of this species. Established infections can cause reduced growth, deformation and eventual death, and trees of all sizes may succumb to this parasite. Additionally, Pinus sabiniana needles are a food of the caterpillars of the Gelechiid moth Chionodes sabinianus.

== Uses ==
Some Native American groups relied heavily on sweet pine nuts for food and are thought to have contributed to the current distribution pattern, including the large gap in distribution in Tulare County. Native Americans also consumed the roots.

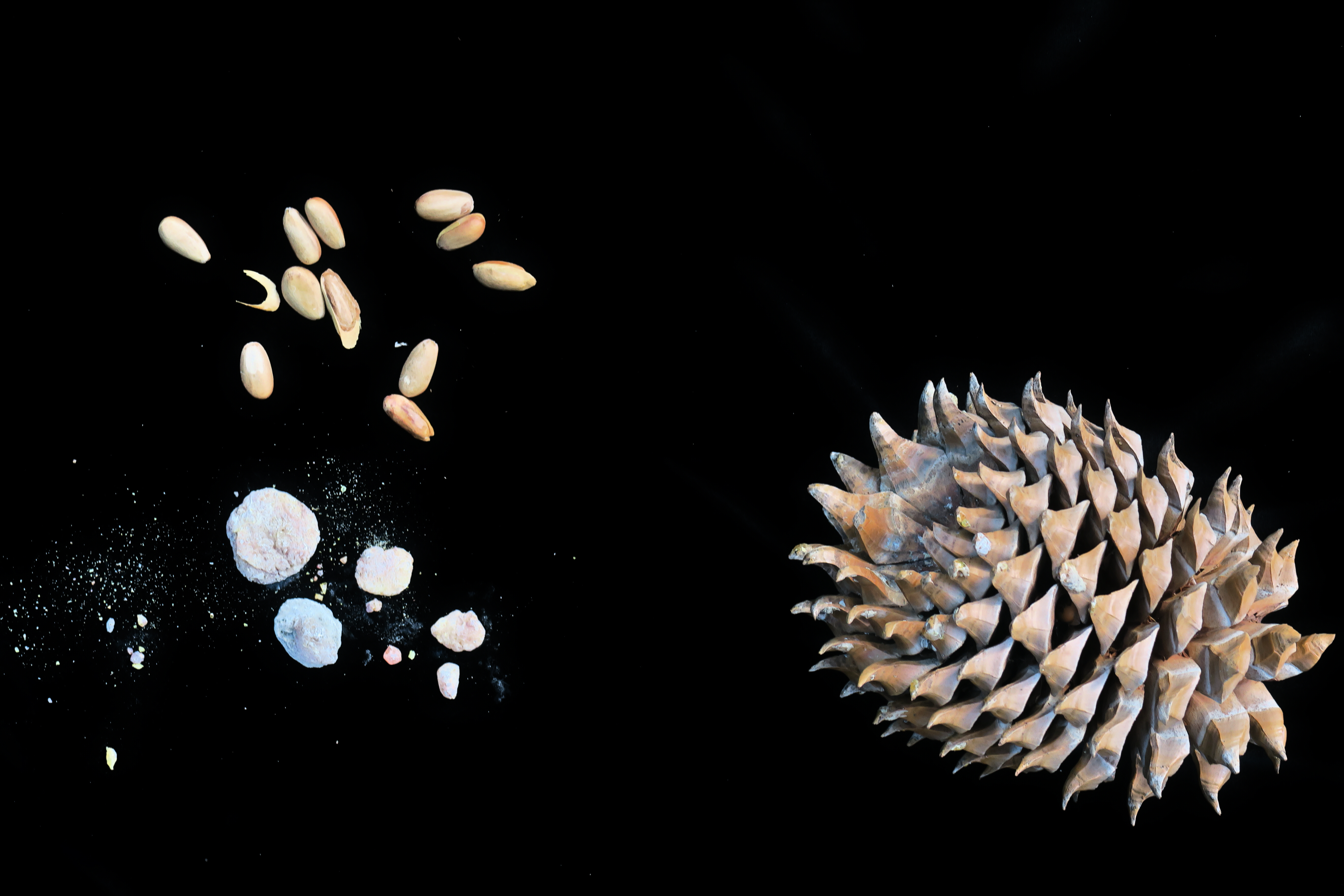
Cone, nuts and resin

Protein and fat nutritional value of the seed are similar to Pinus pinea seeds and figured in the local indigenous diet.

Ohlone people chewed the pitch as a treatment for rheumatism.

Wood uses historically were determined by its particular characteristics, e.g., 0.43 mean specific gravity nearly equal to Douglas-fir (Pseudotsuga menziesii); strength properties similar to ponderosa pine; Kraft pulps high in bursting with tensile strength comparable to some northern conifer pulps; and foothill stands loggable in winter, when higher-altitude species were inaccessible. However, the high amounts of resin and compression wood, the often crooked form, heavy weight, and low stand density, made it expensive otherwise to log, transport and process. Commercial value decreased by the 1960s, to limited use for railroad ties, box "shook", pallet stock, and chips.

It may still offer potential as windbreak shelterbelt plantings.

The main turpentine constituent, n-heptane, a linear alkane, constituting approximately 37 percent of resin derived from its wood, is unusual in botany; the only other sources in nature perhaps being the closely related Pinus jeffreyi, sometimes known as the "gasoline tree", which gained historical significance when distilling its resin during the 19th century accidentally led to the extraction of exceptionally pure n-heptane and several accidental explosions during the 19th century, inspiring n-heptane to be used as the zero point for octane rating—and within Pittosporum resiniferum, likewise known as the "petroleum nut" or kerosene tree.
