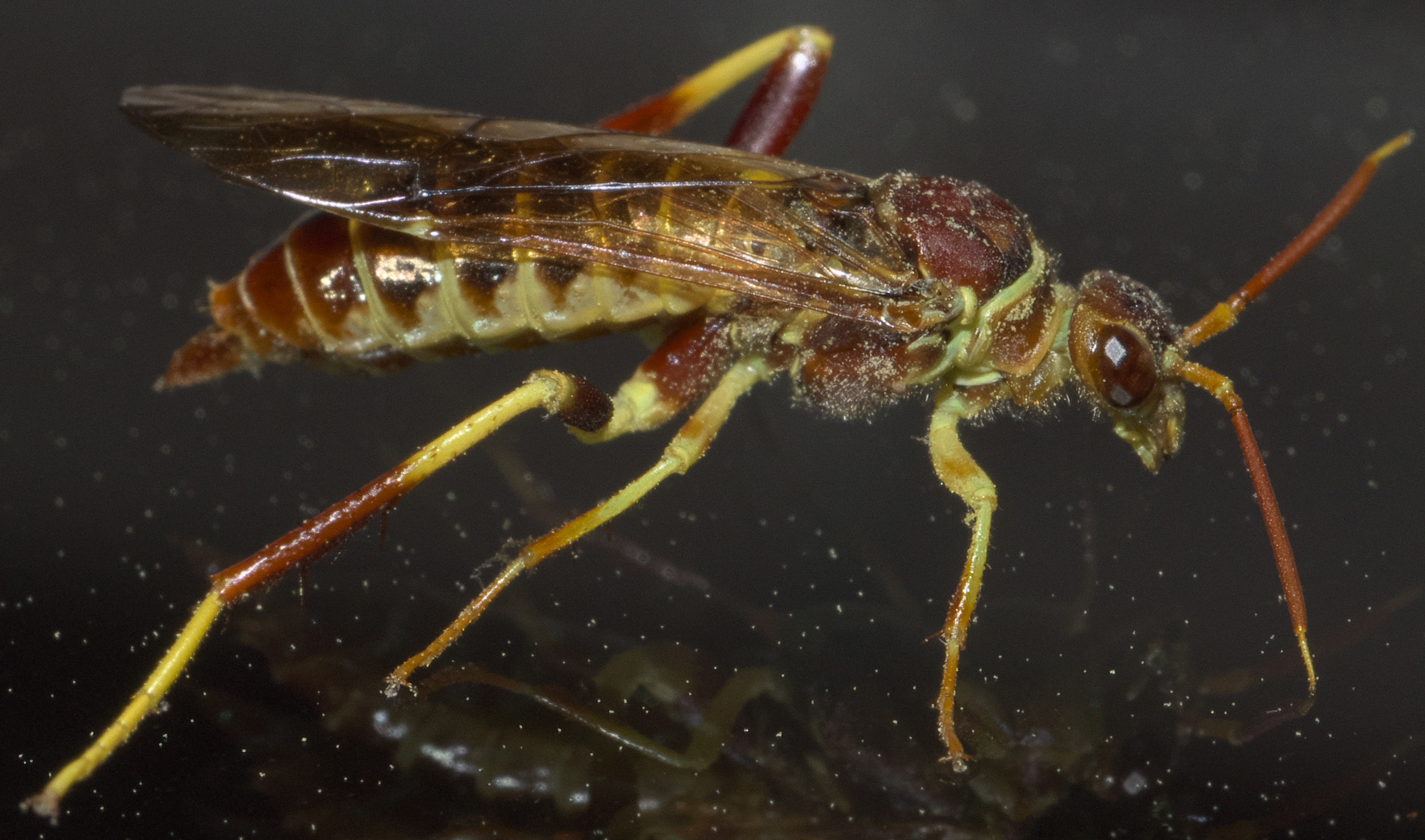
- Megaxyela sp. from Oklahoma
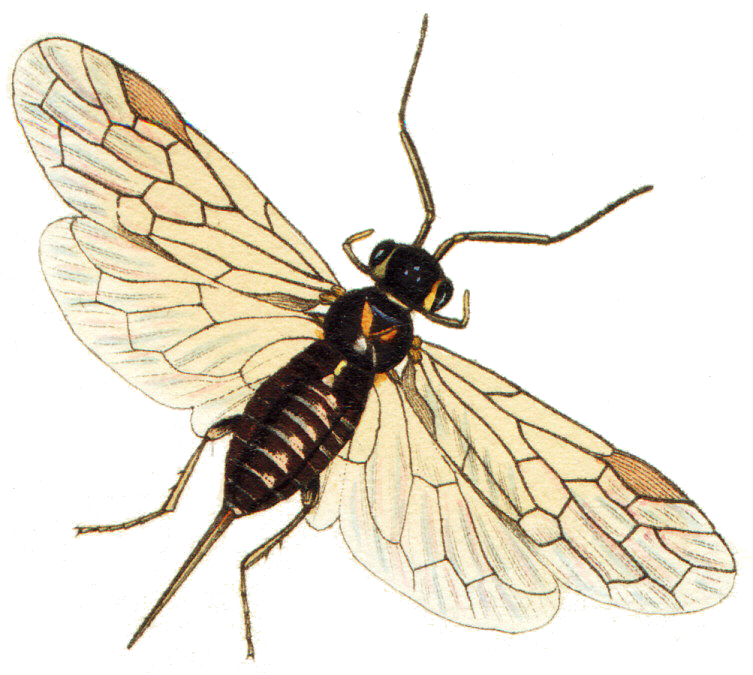
- Xyela, the type genus of Xyelidae, from British Entomology

Scientific classification
- Kingdom: Animalia
- Phylum: Arthropoda
- Clade: Pancrustacea
- Class: Insecta
- Order: Hymenoptera
- Superfamily: Xyeloidea; Newman, 1834
- Family: Xyelidae; Newman, 1834

Genera
- See text

= Xyelidae =

Xyelidae Temporal range: Triassic–Holocene, 227–0 Ma

Family of sawflies

The Xyelidae are a comparatively species-poor family of sawflies, comprising about 80 extant species in five genera worldwide, and is the only family in the superfamily Xyeloidea. The fossil record of the family is extensive, comprising more than 120 species and including the oldest fossil Hymenoptera species dating back to the Triassic, between 245 and 208 million years ago. Xyelidae are sister to all other contemporary lineages of Hymenoptera and have many ancestral morphological features.

The extant species occur in the Northern Hemisphere, especially in boreal regions of the Holarctic, though there are a few Oriental species. Two genera and about 15 species occur in Europe. Considering additional fossil records from Australia, South Africa and Argentina, the extant species display a relict distribution. The species in the subfamily Xyelinae are associated with conifers (esp. Pinus and Abies), where the larvae feed on pollen or within buds. The larvae of the subfamily Macroxyelinae feed on the leaves of deciduous trees (various Juglandaceae and Ulmus).

The family is characterized by the appendages of the head, which are remarkable in that the antennae and palpi are nearly leg-like in structure, with a long basal segment followed by a series of tiny segments, as in the tibia-tarsus.

== Description ==
=== Imago (Adult) ===
Xyelidae are small Hymenoptera. Most species are 3 to 5 mm long, but species of Macroxyela and Megaxyela of East Asia and North America are larger, measuring 10 to 15 mm. The imagines display a number of ancestral characters of Hymenoptera, which may be absent in more derived lineages of Hymenoptera. Those include the absence of a wasp waist (thorax and abdomen abut without constriction), presence of cenchri on the metathorax to fix the wings at rest, presence of an antennal grooming apparatus on tibia and first tarsomere of the fore leg, and presence of a molar tooth on the mandible. Most intriguing is the morphology of the antenna which bears a long and thick third article followed by a number of shorter and more slender antennomeres. This so-called synantennomere 3 is the product from the ontogenetic fusion of several antennal articles, and it is unique among the extant Hymenoptera species. In Pleroneura, Xyelecia and most species of Xyela the maxillary palps are strongly enlarged and bear specialized setae on the distal articles. The wing venation is the most complete among Hymenoptera: Only in Xyelidae the radial sector Rs furcates into the veins Rs1 and Rs2, while in other Hymenoptera Rs1 is absent. The females bear a more or less long ovipositor, which in some species of Xyela may be as long as the body. Morphology of the ovipositor and the ovipositor sheath are important characters for identification to species level. The penis valves of the males are densely setulous. Females and males mate with the bodies directing in opposite direction. In Xyelinae the genital capsule of the males are revolved for 180° after disclosure from the pupal skin (strophandry). Macroxyelinae are orthandrous after emergence. They mate in the same position as Xyelinae, but the male genital capsule is rotated yet in course of mating (facultative strophandry).

=== Larva ===
Like in many other sawflies, the larvae of Xyelidae are superficially similar to caterpillars of Lepidoptera ("eruciform" type of larvae). Larvae of species feeding inside plants are whitish, those of free-feeding species whitish green or yellow. Larvae of Megaxyela bear a conspicuous pattern of black spots (see plate 21 figure 3 in) or they resemble bird droppings. The roundish head capsule bears a larval eye (stemma) on each side, which is reduced in mining species, and short antennae comprising five articles. The thorax bears short legs comprising three articles. Unlike the larvae of all other Hymenoptera and Lepidoptera which lack prolegs on at least the first abdominal segment, larvae of Xyelidae have prolegs on all abdominal segments. In free feeding Xyelidae (Macroxyela, Megaxyela) the abdominal prolegs are conspicuous and consist of two articles, while in the mining species (Pleroneura, Xyela) they are reduced to inconspicuous transverse bulges.

=== Pupa ===
Unique among the Hymenoptera, the pupa of Xyelidae are of the decticous and exarate types, in which the antennae, legs and mandibles are free and mobile. This stage represents the already developed (pharate) imago which is still enclosed by the pupal skin. At this stage, the wings are not expanded, and in females, the ovipositor and its sheath curve dorsally above the tip of the abdomen. The decticous pupae are capable of biting open the cocoon, digging to the surface of the ground, moving around on the surface, and drinking (figs 22-23 in). This pupal form is an ancestral character of holometabolan insects. In other orders, it occurs in including Neuropterida, Mecoptera, Trichoptera and in some lineages of Lepidoptera. The Hymenoptera excluding Xyelidae are characterized by immobile adecticous pupae.

== Ecology ==
The larvae of all Xyelidae are phytophagous and associated with trees. Larvae of the comparatively species-rich Xyela live inside the growing staminate cones of pines and feed on the sporophylls and the pollen. The North American Xyela gallicaulis is exceptional in causing galls on fresh shoots of some pine species, inside which the larva feeds. Larvae of Pleroneura feed inside young shoots of firs. Only the Japanese Pleroneura piceae is associated with spruce. Larvae of Macroxyelinae are free feeders of deciduous tree species. The two North American species of Macroxyela feed on elms, the East Asian and North American species of Megaxyela on Juglandaceae like walnuts, hickory and wingnuts. For Xyelecia nearctica an endophagous life style and an association with firs is supposed.

Many species of Xyelidae are host specific, with only a single larval host plant known. Monophagy is the prevailing life style in most species of Xyela. For this genus, the date of oviposition is closely correlated with the development of the staminate cones of the host pines, which might prevent a host shift in many cases. For some North American species of Xyela the association with each several species of pines (oligophagy) has been reported in literature, but supposedly such records are often based on taxonomic problems to separate morphologically similar species of Xyela properly. Through molecular access, true oligophagy could be demonstrated recently for Xyela bakeri (associated at least with Pinus contorta, Pinus ponderosa and Pinus sabiniana) and Xyela brunneiceps (associated with Pinus flexilis and Pinus strobiformis). Lack of reliable, reproducible host data could cause inaccurate reports of monophagy or oligophagy in many taxa of Xyelidae, but at least some of the species included in Megaxyela and Pleroneura are truly oligophagous.

After completing feeding, Xyelidae larvae dig into the ground and form an earthen cell, where they usually spin a cocoon and develop into a pupa. Absence of a cocoon has been observed in Megaxyela togashii from Japan. The imago emerges in the following spring to mate. Subsequently, the female deposits eggs with the ovipositor. In most species of Xyela, the tip of valvula 3 of the ovipositor sheath is equipped with specialized sensory structures called sensilla trichodea and sensilla campaniformia, which are involved in the oviposition process. In Pleroneura, unlike practically all other Hymenoptera, the hard and conical ovipositor sheath is used in addition to the ovipositor proper to penetrate the resinous buds of firs. Megaxyela gigantea and most other species of Megaxyela has strikingly long hind legs which are used to fold a newly growing leaf to provide shelter for their eggs which are fixed with glutinous material between on the upper sides of the folded leaf.

Many species of Xyelidae facultatively diapause for several years. In Xyela alpigena and Xyela obscura a diapause of at least two years is obligate. This strategy might have evolved to ensure well developed cones are available for oviposition: the host plants Pinus cembra and Pinus mugo produce cones very irregularly in the subalpine zone of the European Alps.

Adults of Xyela are pollen feeders of a variety of plants, which bear flowers with easily accessible pollen (e.g., Betula, Cercocarpus, Ostrya, Pinus, Purshia, Quercus, Salix). The enlarged maxillary palps of most Xyela (and supposedly also of Pleroneura and Xyelecia) serve for the extraction of pollen from the flowers.

Although they feed upon often economically important tree species, Xyelidae are usually of only small significance as pest organisms. Pleroneura piceae damages the growth of Sakhalin spruce, since the larvae destroy the young shoots. Larvae of Megaxyela major (and supposedly also of Megaxyela langstoni) feed on leaves of pecan and are regarded as a pest of pecan plantations in the Southeastern USA.

== Systematics and taxonomy ==
Xyelidae are very likely the sister taxon of all other extant Hymenoptera. This assertion is supported by phylogenetic analyses of both morphological characters and DNA sequences. The great age of the family is supported by numerous fossil records. All Hymenoptera recorded from the Triassic are classified as Xyelidae, while representatives of other hymenopterous families have been found no earlier than the Jurassic. During the Mesozoic and the Tertiary, the Xyelidae obviously were much more species-rich and more widely distributed than today. Thus, the comparatively few extant species can be regarded a relict group.

=== Extant taxa ===
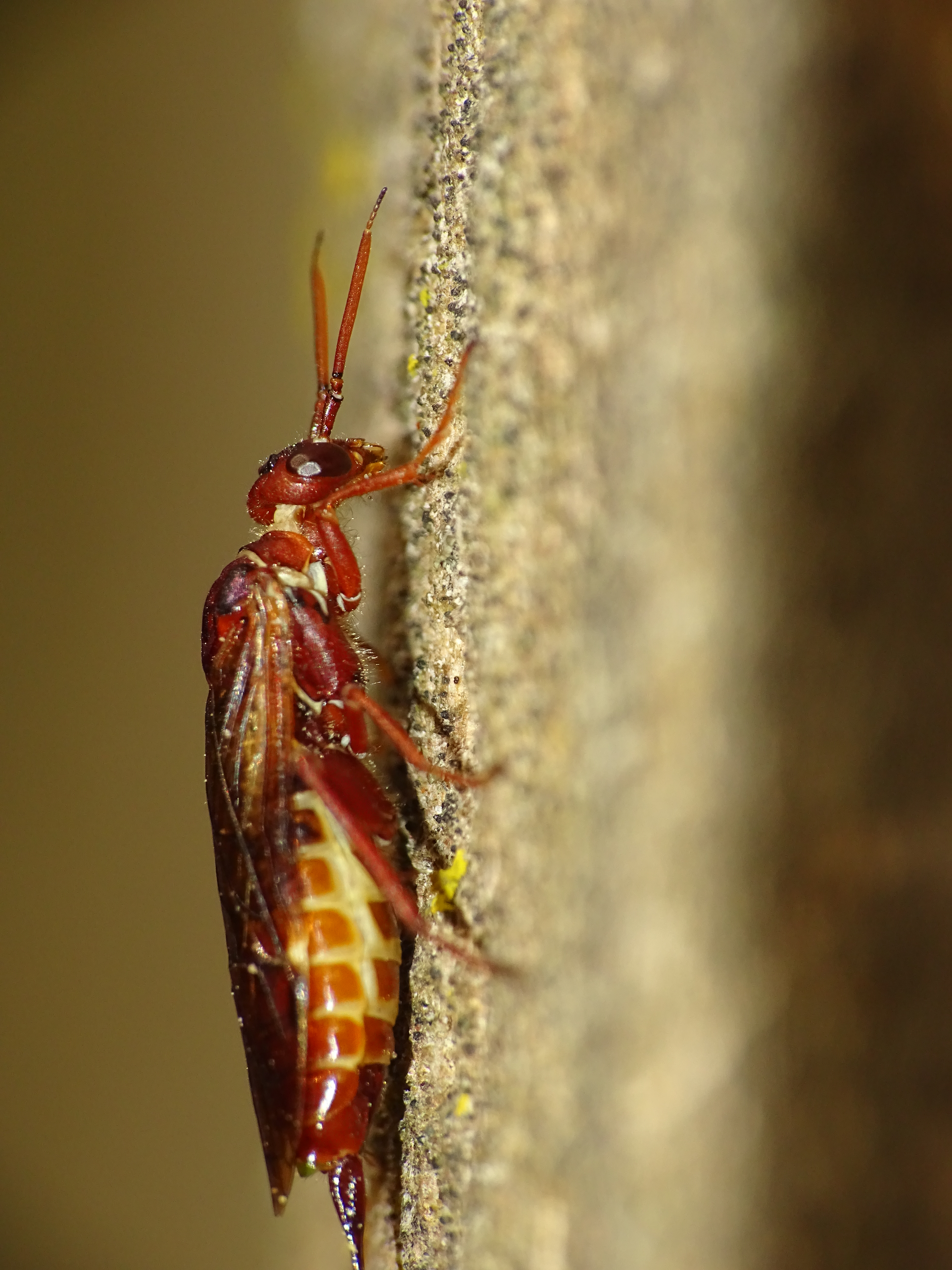
Macroxyela sp. from Ontario

The Electronic World Catalog of Symphyta provides a complete account of the valid extant genera and species, their synonyms, the concerning references to original descriptions and distribution data on the level of countries and provinces.

- Xyelinae
  - Pleroneura Konow, 1897: at least eight species in Eurasia and five in North America
  - Xyela Brébisson, 1819 (synonyms: Pinicola Dalman, 1818 [preoccupied by the genus-group name of birds Pinicola Vieillot, 1808], Xyelatana Benson, 1938)
    - Xyela (Pinicolites) Meunier, 1920: Xyela lata D.R. Smith, 1990 in western North America
    - Xyela (Xyela) Brébisson, 1819: 29 species in Eurasia and 20 in North America, but many additional species have not yet been described.
- Macroxyelinae
  - Macroxyela W.F. Kirby, 1882: Macroxyela aenea (Norton, 1872) and Macroxyela ferruginea (Say, 1824) in eastern and central North America
  - Megaxyela Ashmead, 1898: six species in eastern Eurasia, seven species in North America.
  - Xyelecia Ross, 1932: two species, Xyelecia japonica Togashi, 1972 in Japan and Xyelecia nearctica in Western North America

The European species can be identified with help of "The Western Palaearctic Xyelidae" of Blank (2002), all Eurasian species of Xyela with Blank et al. (2013). The North American Macroxyelinae were revised by Smith & Schiff (1998), the North American species of Xyela by Burdick (1961), the North American species of Pleroneura by Smith et al. (1977), the East Asian species of Megaxyela by Shinohara (1992), the East Asian species of Pleroneura by Shinohara (1995), and the species of Megaxyela of the World by Blank et al. (2017).

=== Extinct taxa ===
The Electronic World Catalog of Symphyta provides a complete account of the valid fossil genera and species, their synonyms and the concerning references to original descriptions.

Genus without classification into a subfamily of Xyelidae

  - †Potrerilloxyela Lara, Rasnitsyn & Zavattieri, 2014, 1 fossil species

†Archexyelinae

  - †Archexyela Riek, 1955, 2 fossil species
  - †Asioxyela Rasnitsyn, 1964, 4 fossil species
  - †Dinoxyela Rasnitsyn, 1969, 1 fossil species
  - †Euryxyela Rasnitsyn, 1964, 1 fossil species
  - †Ferganoxyela Rasnitsyn, 1969, 2 fossil species
  - †Leioxyela Rasnitsyn, 1969, 5 fossil species
  - †Lithoxyela Rasnitsyn, 1969, 1 fossil species
  - †Madygenius Rasnitsyn, 1969, 2 fossil species
  - †Moltenia Schlüter, 2000, 1 fossil species
  - †Oryctoxyela Rasnitsyn, 1969, 2 fossil species
  - †Triassoxyela Rasnitsyn, 1964, 3 fossil species
  - †Xaxexis Pagliano & Scaramozzino, 1990 [= Euryxyela Hong, 1984], 1 fossil species
  - †Xiphoxyela Rasnitsyn, 1969, 2 fossil species
  - †Xyelinus Rasnitsyn, 1964, 2 fossil species

Macroxyelinae

- Genera without classification into a tribe of Macroxyelinae
  - †Bolboxyela Rasnitsyn, 1990, 1 fossil species
  - †Brachyoxyela Gao, Zhao & Ren, 2011, 2 fossil species
- †Angaridyelini
  - †Angaridyela Rasnitsyn, 1966, 8 fossil species
  - †Baissoxyela Rasnitsyn, 1969, 1 fossil species
  - †Ceratoxyela J. Zhang & X. Zhang, 2000, 1 fossil species
  - †Lethoxyela J. Zhang & X. Zhang, 2000, 2 fossil species
  - †Liaoxyela J. Zhang & X. Zhang, 2000, 1 fossil species
  - †Nigrimonticola Rasnitsyn, 1966, 1 fossil species
  - †Ophthalmoxyela Rasnitsyn, 1966, 1 fossil species
- †Ceroxyelini
  - †Ceroxyela Rasnitsyn, 1966, 1 fossil species
  - †Isoxyela J. Zhang & X. Zhang, 2000, 1 fossil species
  - †Sinoxyela J. Zhang & X. Zhang, 2000, 1 fossil species
- †Gigantoxyelini
  - †Abrotoxyela Gao, Ren & Shih, 2009, 2 fossil species
  - †Chaetoxyela Rasnitsyn, 1966, 1 fossil species
  - †Chionoxyela Rasnitsyn, 1993, 1 fossil species
  - †Gigantoxyela Rasnitsyn, 1966, 1 fossil species
  - †Heteroxyela J. Zhang & X. Zhang, 2000, 1 fossil species
  - †Platyxyela Wang, Shih & Ren, 2012, 1 fossil species
  - †Shartexyela Rasnitsyn, 2008, 1 fossil species
- Macroxyelini
  - †Anthoxyela Rasnitsyn, 1977, 4 fossil species
  - Megaxyela Ashmead, 1898, 2 fossil species in addition to extant species
- Xyeleciini
  - †Microxyelecia Rasnitsyn, 1969, 1 fossil species
  - †Uroxyela Rasnitsyn, 1966, 1 fossil species
  - Xyelecia Ross, 1932, 1 fossil species in addition to extant species
  - †Xyelites Rasnitsyn, 1966, 2 fossil species

†Madygellinae

  - †Chubakka Kopylov, 2014, 1 fossil species
  - †Madygella Rasnitsyn, 1969, 5 fossil species
  - †Samarkandykia Kopylov, 2014, 2 fossil species

Xyelinae

- †Liadoxyelini
  - †Aequixyela Wang, Rasnitsyn & Ren, 2014, 1 fossil species
  - †Anomoxyela Rasnitsyn, 1966, 1 fossil species
  - †Cathayxyela Wang, Rasnitsyn & Ren, 2014, 1 fossil species
  - †Kirghizoxyela Rasnitsyn, 1966, 1 fossil species
  - †Liadoxyela Martynov, 1937, 3 fossil species
  - †Lydoxyela Rasnitsyn, 1966, 1 fossil species
  - †Orthoxyela Rasnitsyn, 1983, 1 fossil species
- Xyelini
  - †Enneoxyela Rasnitsyn, 1966, 4 fossil species
  - †Eoxyela Rasnitsyn, 1965, 5 fossil species
  - †Spathoxyela Rasnitsyn, 1969, 2 fossil species
  - Xyela Dalman, 1819, 7 fossil species in addition to extant species, including Xyela (Pinicolites) Meunier, 1920
  - †Xyelisca Rasnitsyn, 1969, 1 fossil species
  - †Yanoxyela Ren, Lu, Guo & Ji, 1995, 1 fossil species
