= Eupragia =

Scientific classification
- Domain: Eukaryota
- Kingdom: Animalia
- Phylum: Arthropoda
- Class: Insecta
- Order: Lepidoptera
- Family: Depressariidae
- Genus: Eupragia; Walsingham, 1911

Genus of moths

Eupragia is a moth genus of the family Depressariidae.

== Species ==
- Eupragia hospita Hodges, 1969
- Eupragia banis Hodges, 1974
- Eupragia oxinopa Meyrick, 1929
- Eupragia solida Walsingham, 1911
