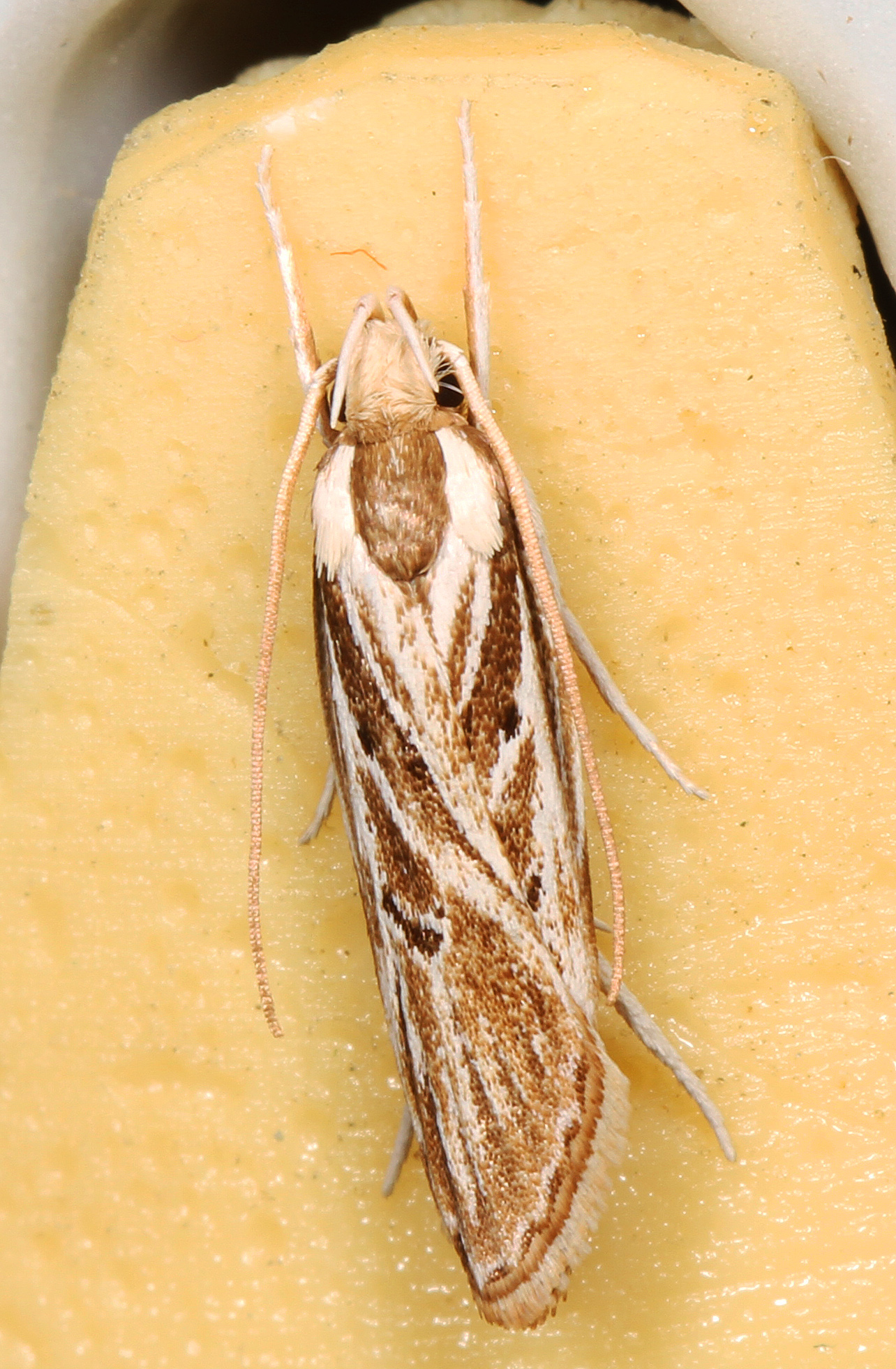

Scientific classification
- Kingdom: Animalia
- Phylum: Arthropoda
- Clade: Pancrustacea
- Class: Insecta
- Order: Lepidoptera
- Family: Depressariidae
- Genus: Eupragia
- Species: E. hospita

Binomial name
- Eupragia hospita Hodges, 1969

= Eupragia hospita =

Species of moth

Eupragia hospita is a moth in the family Depressariidae. It was described by Ronald W. Hodges in 1969. It is found in North America, where it has been recorded from Florida south to South Carolina and west to Texas.
