= Eupragia oxinopa =

Scientific classification
- Domain: Eukaryota
- Kingdom: Animalia
- Phylum: Arthropoda
- Class: Insecta
- Order: Lepidoptera
- Family: Depressariidae
- Genus: Eupragia
- Species: E. oxinopa

Binomial name
- Eupragia oxinopa Meyrick, 1929

Species of moth

Eupragia oxinopa is a moth in the family Depressariidae. It was described by Edward Meyrick in 1929. It is found in Colombia.
