= Eupragia solida =

Scientific classification
- Domain: Eukaryota
- Kingdom: Animalia
- Phylum: Arthropoda
- Class: Insecta
- Order: Lepidoptera
- Family: Depressariidae
- Genus: Eupragia
- Species: E. solida

Binomial name
- Eupragia solida Walsingham, 1911

Species of moth

Eupragia solida is a moth in the family Depressariidae. It was described by Walsingham in 1911. It is found in Mexico, where it has been recorded from Tabasco.

== Classification ==
The wingspan is about 18 mm. The forewings are dark fawn-brown, sprinkled and shaded with black scaling, the lines of neuration for the most part indicated by narrow whitish ochreous streaks, of which those on veins 2, 10, and 11 are perhaps the most conspicuous.

The costa is narrowly streaked with whitish ochreous, and below the fold, from the base to the middle of the dorsum, is another conspicuous whitish ochreous streak with roughly raised scales towards its base, beneath it an elongate black patch above the dorsum and a patch of projecting mixed brown and ochreous scales lying below this on the flexus.

Above the fold, but not reaching to the base, is also an elongate black patch, widening outward and diffused in scattered scales along the cell and along the upper edge of the fold. Small transverse strigulae of similar black scales are found between the veins beyond the cell in the direction of both margins and at the end of the cell is a transverse crescent-shaped black spot, outlined with whitish ochreous, and placed somewhat obliquely, a smaller oval and similarly ocelloid spot on the cell halfway between this and the base.

There is a narrow blackish terminal line preceding the cilia which are fawn-brown mixed with pale ochreous. The hindwings are pale brownish fuscous, with a bluish grey sheen.
