= Eupragia banis =

Scientific classification
- Kingdom: Animalia
- Phylum: Arthropoda
- Clade: Pancrustacea
- Class: Insecta
- Order: Lepidoptera
- Family: Depressariidae
- Genus: Eupragia
- Species: E. banis

Binomial name
- Eupragia banis Hodges, 1974

Species of moth

Eupragia banis is a moth in the family Depressariidae. It was described by Ronald W. Hodges in 1974. It is found in North America, where it has been recorded from Arizona.
