= Faculta synthetica =

Scientific classification
- Kingdom: Animalia
- Phylum: Arthropoda
- Clade: Pancrustacea
- Class: Insecta
- Order: Lepidoptera
- Family: Gelechiidae
- Genus: Faculta
- Species: F. synthetica

Binomial name
- Faculta synthetica (Walsingham, 1911)

Synonyms
- Gelechia synthetica Walsingham, 1911

Species of moth

Faculta synthetica is a moth of the family Gelechiidae. It is found in Mexico (Sonora).

The wingspan is 11–12 mm. The forewings are blackish with a slight purplish tinge and minute hoary speckling, except where black spots, each accompanied by some brownish ochreous scales, are distinguishable from the less intensely dark wing-surface.

Of these spots, the first is on the costa at one-fourth, placed rather obliquely, with a narrow ochreous subcostal line reaching from the base. Another lies nearer to the base on the upper edge of the fold and a third with some ochreous scales preceding and following it, lies in the fold before half of the wing length, and this is almost connected with a discal spot above it.

Another triangular black spot, with ochreous scales along its inner edge, is at the end of the cell, beyond which a short, curved, ochreous costal streak precedes the pale brownish cinereous cilia which are dusted with fuscous. The hindwings are leaden grey, blending to bronzy brownish outward, especially toward the margins.
