= Faculta =

Scientific classification
- Kingdom: Animalia
- Phylum: Arthropoda
- Class: Insecta
- Order: Lepidoptera
- Family: Gelechiidae
- Tribe: Gelechiini
- Genus: Faculta; Busck, 1939

Genus of moths

Faculta is a genus of moths in the family Gelechiidae.

== Species ==
- Faculta inaequalis (Busck, 1910)
- Faculta synthetica (Walsingham, 1911)
- Faculta triangulella (Busck, 1907)
