= Faculta inaequalis =

Scientific classification
- Domain: Eukaryota
- Kingdom: Animalia
- Phylum: Arthropoda
- Class: Insecta
- Order: Lepidoptera
- Family: Gelechiidae
- Genus: Faculta
- Species: F. inaequalis

Binomial name
- Faculta inaequalis (Busck, 1910)

Synonyms
- Gelechia inaequalis Busck, 1910; Gelechia inaequalis Walsingham, 1911 (preocc. Busck, 1910); Gelechia anisectis Meyrick, 1923; Gelechia clistrodoma Meyrick, 1923

Species of moth

Faculta inaequalis is a moth of the family Gelechiidae. It is found in Mexico and the United States, where it has been recorded from California, Arizona and New Mexico.

The wingspan is about 13 mm. The forewings are ochreous-whitish speckled grey, more thinly on the basal third and with a small blackish dot beneath the costa near the base, and one raised beyond it in the disc. There is a hardly oblique narrow black fascia from the costa at one-third not reaching the dorsum, a faint rosy tinge beneath its extremity. The discal stigmata are very small, black, the second placed on the inner edge of a narrow transverse fascia of which the costal third is black, the discal is whitish, the dorsal rosy-ochreous and there is some indistinct rosy-ochreous suffusion towards the apex, as well as some groups of dark grey scales on the costa towards the apex. The hindwings are grey.
