= Faculta triangulella =

Scientific classification
- Kingdom: Animalia
- Phylum: Arthropoda
- Class: Insecta
- Order: Lepidoptera
- Family: Gelechiidae
- Genus: Faculta
- Species: F. triangulella

Binomial name
- Faculta triangulella (Busck, 1907)

Synonyms
- Gelechia triangulella Busck, 1907

Species of moth

Faculta triangulella is a moth of the family Gelechiidae. It is found in North America, where it has been recorded from California and Arizona.

The wingspan is 12–13 mm. The forewings are light fuscous, heavily overlaid with dark fuscous scales, and with a roseate tinge. On the middle of the cell is a blackish triangular spot with one point touching the fold and preceded basally by a few ochreous scales. There is also a similar blackish triangular spot at the end of the cell and the edges of both spots are faintly continued to the costal edge. The apical third of the wing is heavily overlaid with blackish scales. The hindwings are light silvery fuscous.
