= Eurysaccoides alternatus =

Scientific classification
- Kingdom: Animalia
- Phylum: Arthropoda
- Clade: Pancrustacea
- Class: Insecta
- Order: Lepidoptera
- Family: Gelechiidae
- Genus: Eurysaccoides
- Species: E. alternatus

Binomial name
- Eurysaccoides alternatus Povolný, 1998

Species of moth

Eurysaccoides alternatus is a moth in the family Gelechiidae. It was described by Povolný in 1998. It is found in North America, where it has been recorded from California.
