= Eurysaccoides =

Scientific classification
- Kingdom: Animalia
- Phylum: Arthropoda
- Clade: Pancrustacea
- Class: Insecta
- Order: Lepidoptera
- Family: Gelechiidae
- Tribe: Gnorimoschemini
- Genus: Eurysaccoides; Povolný, 1998

Genus of moths

Eurysaccoides is a genus of moths in the family Gelechiidae.

== Species ==
- Eurysaccoides alternatus Povolný, 1998
- Eurysaccoides gallaespinosae Povolný, 1998
