= Ethmia heptastica =

Scientific classification
- Kingdom: Animalia
- Phylum: Arthropoda
- Clade: Pancrustacea
- Class: Insecta
- Order: Lepidoptera
- Family: Depressariidae
- Genus: Ethmia
- Species: E. heptastica

Binomial name
- Ethmia heptastica Walsingham, 1912

Synonyms
- Ethmia heptasticta

Species of moth

Ethmia heptastica is a moth in the family Depressariidae. It is found along the west coast of Mexico, from Sonora and Sinaloa south to Cuernavaca and northern Guerrero.

The length of the forewings is 7.4–11 mm (0.29–0.43 in). The ground color of the forewings is divided by a longitudinal line along. The costal half is dark brown, the line forming two irregular, square spurs of dark from the cell into the pale dorsal area at the basal one-fourth and the middle. The ground color of the hindwings is uniform dark brown. Adults are on wing in June, July and August.
