= Ethmia hakkarica =

Scientific classification
- Domain: Eukaryota
- Kingdom: Animalia
- Phylum: Arthropoda
- Class: Insecta
- Order: Lepidoptera
- Family: Depressariidae
- Genus: Ethmia
- Species: E. hakkarica

Binomial name
- Ethmia hakkarica Koçak, 1986

Species of moth

Ethmia hakkarica is a moth in the family Depressariidae. It was described by Ahmet Ömer Koçak in 1986. It is found in Turkey.
