= Ethmia cypraeella =

Scientific classification
- Kingdom: Animalia
- Phylum: Arthropoda
- Clade: Pancrustacea
- Class: Insecta
- Order: Lepidoptera
- Family: Depressariidae
- Genus: Ethmia
- Species: E. cypraeella

Binomial name
- Ethmia cypraeella (Zeller, 1863)

Synonyms
- Psecadia cypraeella Zeller, 1863

Species of moth

Ethmia cypraeella is a moth in the family Depressariidae. It is found in northern Venezuela.

The length of the forewings is 8–9 mm (0.31–0.35 in). The ground color of the forewings is white. The ground color of the hindwings is white, but pale brownish apically. Adults are on wing from April to July.
