= Ethmia linsdalei =

Scientific classification
- Kingdom: Animalia
- Phylum: Arthropoda
- Clade: Pancrustacea
- Class: Insecta
- Order: Lepidoptera
- Family: Depressariidae
- Genus: Ethmia
- Species: E. linsdalei

Binomial name
- Ethmia linsdalei Powell, 1973

Species of moth

Ethmia linsdalei is a moth in the family Depressariidae. It is found in Mexico.

The length of the forewings is 9.2–10 mm (0.36–0.39 in).
