= Ethmia tricula =

Scientific classification
- Kingdom: Animalia
- Phylum: Arthropoda
- Clade: Pancrustacea
- Class: Insecta
- Order: Lepidoptera
- Family: Depressariidae
- Genus: Ethmia
- Species: E. tricula

Binomial name
- Ethmia tricula Powell, 1973

Species of moth

Ethmia tricula is a moth in the family Depressariidae. It is found in California, United States.

The length of the forewings is about 4.3 mm (0.17 in), making it the smallest member of the genus Ethmia in the New World. The ground color of the forewings and hindwings is uniform, dull gray-brown including the fringes.
