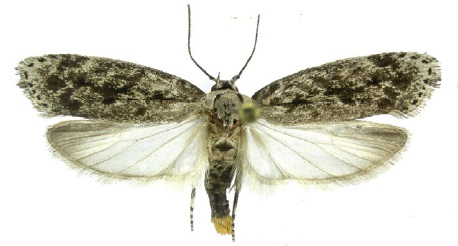

Scientific classification
- Domain: Eukaryota
- Kingdom: Animalia
- Phylum: Arthropoda
- Class: Insecta
- Order: Lepidoptera
- Family: Depressariidae
- Genus: Ethmia
- Species: E. transversella

Binomial name
- Ethmia transversella Busck, 1914

= Ethmia transversella =

Species of moth

Ethmia transversella is a moth in the family Depressariidae. It is found in Costa Rica, where it is found throughout the country at altitudes between 1,200 and 1,750 meters (3,940 and 5,740 ft). The habitat consists of rain forests.

The length of the forewings is 14–15.6 mm (0.55–0.61 in). The ground color of the forewings is gray, more or less completely clouded with indistinct blackish brown. The ground color of the hindwings is semihyaline (partially glassy) whitish, but brownish along the costal area beyond the middle and on the terminal margin. Adults have been recorded in January.
