= Ethmia thomaswitti =

Scientific classification
- Domain: Eukaryota
- Kingdom: Animalia
- Phylum: Arthropoda
- Class: Insecta
- Order: Lepidoptera
- Family: Depressariidae
- Genus: Ethmia
- Species: E. thomaswitti

Binomial name
- Ethmia thomaswitti Kun, 2004

Species of moth

Ethmia thomaswitti is a moth in the family Depressariidae. It was described by Andras Kun in 2004. It is found on Sulawesi in Indonesia. The habitat consists of lowland rain forests and lower montane forests.

== Etymology ==
The species is named for Thomas Witt.
