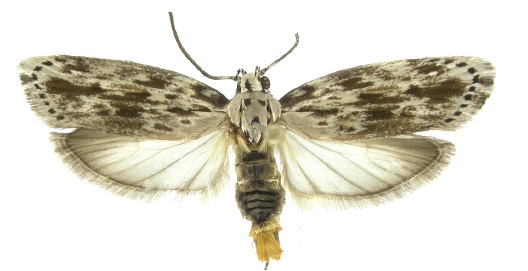

Scientific classification
- Kingdom: Animalia
- Phylum: Arthropoda
- Clade: Pancrustacea
- Class: Insecta
- Order: Lepidoptera
- Family: Depressariidae
- Genus: Ethmia
- Species: E. baliostola

Binomial name
- Ethmia baliostola Walsingham, 1912

Synonyms
- Ethmia baliostoma Busck 1914

= Ethmia baliostola =

Species of moth

Ethmia baliostola is a moth in the family Depressariidae. It is found in north-western South America (the coast of Colombia) to southern Mexico (Chiapas and Yucatán).

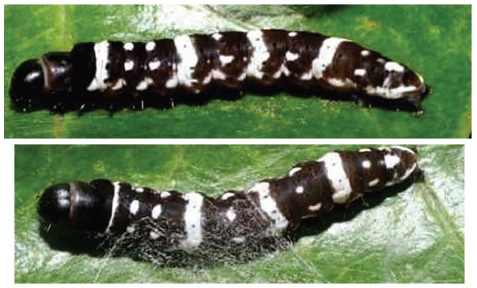
Larva

The length of the forewings is 10.7–14.1 mm (0.42–0.56 in). The ground color of the forewings is white, largely replaced by grayish and dark brown irregular and indistinct markings, forming elongated spots and streaks, which are at times somewhat distinct. The ground color of the hindwings is pearly white, becoming brown at the margins. Adults are on wing from March to April (in Costa Rica), from May to July and September to October (in Panama and Mexico) and in November (in Colombia). There are at least two generations per year.

The larvae feed on Bourreria oxyphylla and Bourreria costaricensis.
