= Ethmia austronamibiensis =

Scientific classification
- Kingdom: Animalia
- Phylum: Arthropoda
- Clade: Pancrustacea
- Class: Insecta
- Order: Lepidoptera
- Family: Depressariidae
- Genus: Ethmia
- Species: E. austronamibiensis

Binomial name
- Ethmia austronamibiensis Mey, 2011

Species of moth

Ethmia austronamibiensis is a moth in the family Depressariidae. It was described by Wolfram Mey in 2011. It is found in Namibia.
