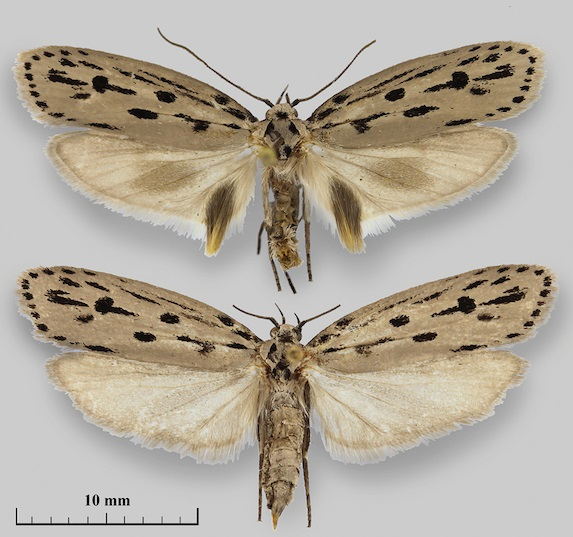
- Male (top); female (bottom)

Scientific classification
- Domain: Eukaryota
- Kingdom: Animalia
- Phylum: Arthropoda
- Class: Insecta
- Order: Lepidoptera
- Family: Depressariidae
- Genus: Ethmia
- Species: E. cribravia

Binomial name
- Ethmia cribravia Wang & Li, 2004

= Ethmia cribravia =

Species of moth

Ethmia cribravia is a moth in the family Depressariidae. It is found in Yunnan, China.

The length of the forewings is 29.5–30.5 mm (1.16–1.20 in). Adults are sexually dimorphic, with the males having prominent androconial scales on the hindwing.
