= Ethmia chalcogramma =

Scientific classification
- Kingdom: Animalia
- Phylum: Arthropoda
- Clade: Pancrustacea
- Class: Insecta
- Order: Lepidoptera
- Family: Depressariidae
- Genus: Ethmia
- Species: E. chalcogramma

Binomial name
- Ethmia chalcogramma Powell, 1973

Species of moth

Ethmia chalcogramma is a moth in the family Depressariidae. It is found in Bolivia.

The length of the forewings is about 9 mm (0.35 in). The ground color of the forewings is white, largely replaced by gray-brown markings. The ground color of the hindwings is white, becoming brownish at the distal margins.
