= Ethmia reposita =

Scientific classification
- Kingdom: Animalia
- Phylum: Arthropoda
- Class: Insecta
- Order: Lepidoptera
- Family: Depressariidae
- Genus: Ethmia
- Species: E. reposita

Binomial name
- Ethmia reposita Diakonoff, [1968]

Species of moth

Ethmia reposita is a moth in the family Depressariidae. It was described by Alexey Diakonoff in 1968. It is found on Mindanao in the Philippines.

The wingspan is about 25 mm (0.98 in). The forewings are glossy grey, with a faint purplish tinge. The spots are dull black, very faintly encircled with paler. There is a suffused spot beyond the base of the costa, connected with a narrow short marginal strigula, as well as a round spot on the fold well beyond the base and two larger oval spots representing the discal stigmata. There are also three smaller, somewhat elongate spots between the cell and margin and eight or nine small marginal subquadrate or fasciate spots along the costa before the apex, in the apex and along the termen to the tornus. The hindwings are light fuscous grey, becoming somewhat darker towards the apex.
