= Ethmia mansita =

Scientific classification
- Domain: Eukaryota
- Kingdom: Animalia
- Phylum: Arthropoda
- Class: Insecta
- Order: Lepidoptera
- Family: Depressariidae
- Genus: Ethmia
- Species: E. mansita

Binomial name
- Ethmia mansita Busck, 1914

Species of moth

Ethmia mansita is a moth in the family Depressariidae. It is found in central Mexico.

The length of the forewings is 8.5–9.1 mm (0.33–0.36 in). The ground color of the forewings is pale gray, overlaid with whitish and with black markings. The ground color of the hindwings is pale brownish, but whitish basally. Adults are on wing in September.
