= Ethmia monachella =

Scientific classification
- Domain: Eukaryota
- Kingdom: Animalia
- Phylum: Arthropoda
- Class: Insecta
- Order: Lepidoptera
- Family: Depressariidae
- Genus: Ethmia
- Species: E. monachella

Binomial name
- Ethmia monachella Busck, 1910

Species of moth

Ethmia monachella is a moth in the family Depressariidae. It is in Colorado and Oklahoma in the United States.

The length of the forewings is about 11 mm (0.43 in). The ground color of the forewings is pale slate gray with a broad, black, evenly and distinctly margined band from the base to the apex. The ground color of the hindwings is blackish.
