= Ethmia defreinai =

Scientific classification
- Domain: Eukaryota
- Kingdom: Animalia
- Phylum: Arthropoda
- Class: Insecta
- Order: Lepidoptera
- Family: Depressariidae
- Genus: Ethmia
- Species: E. defreinai

Binomial name
- Ethmia defreinai Ganev, 1984

Species of moth

Ethmia defreinai is a moth in the family Depressariidae. It was described by Julius Ganev in 1984. It is found in Turkey.
