= Ethmia nobilis =

Scientific classification
- Kingdom: Animalia
- Phylum: Arthropoda
- Class: Insecta
- Order: Lepidoptera
- Family: Depressariidae
- Genus: Ethmia
- Species: E. nobilis

Binomial name
- Ethmia nobilis Diakonoff, [1968]

Species of moth

Ethmia nobilis is a moth in the family Depressariidae. It was described by Alexey Diakonoff in 1968. It is found on Luzon in the Philippines.

The wingspan is about 25 mm (0.98 in). The forewings are glossy, light slate grey with a faint purplish hue. The markings are black, faintly edged with whitish. There are also three elongate plical dots, becoming larger posteriorly. There is also a larger oval spot in the cell in the middle of the wing and three subapical dots, as well as a row of eleven marginal dots. The hindwings are glossy light grey fuscous, the basal fourth as far as the lower edge of the cell whitish.
