= Ethmia baja =

Scientific classification
- Kingdom: Animalia
- Phylum: Arthropoda
- Clade: Pancrustacea
- Class: Insecta
- Order: Lepidoptera
- Family: Depressariidae
- Genus: Ethmia
- Species: E. baja

Binomial name
- Ethmia baja Powell, 1973

Species of moth

Ethmia baja is a moth in the family Depressariidae. It is found in the Cape District of Baja California, Mexico.

The length of the forewings is 5.7–8 mm (0.22–0.31 in).
