= Ethmia epileuca =

Scientific classification
- Kingdom: Animalia
- Phylum: Arthropoda
- Clade: Pancrustacea
- Class: Insecta
- Order: Lepidoptera
- Family: Depressariidae
- Genus: Ethmia
- Species: E. epileuca

Binomial name
- Ethmia epileuca Powell, 1959

Species of moth

Ethmia epileuca is a moth in the family Depressariidae. It is found in the United States in southern California and Tucson, Arizona.

The length of the forewings is 8.3–10.4 mm (0.33–0.41 in). The ground color of the forewings is divided by a straight longitudinal line, it is brown or gray-brown above and white below. The ground color of the hindwings (including fringe and underside) is white. Adults are on wing from February to April.
