= Ethmia angarensis =

Scientific classification
- Domain: Eukaryota
- Kingdom: Animalia
- Phylum: Arthropoda
- Class: Insecta
- Order: Lepidoptera
- Family: Depressariidae
- Genus: Ethmia
- Species: E. angarensis

Binomial name
- Ethmia angarensis Caradja, 1939

Species of moth

Ethmia angarensis is a moth in the family Depressariidae. It is found in China (Shanxi) and the Russian Far East.

Adults have been recorded from late June to July.
