= Ethmia gonimodes =

Scientific classification
- Kingdom: Animalia
- Phylum: Arthropoda
- Class: Insecta
- Order: Lepidoptera
- Family: Depressariidae
- Genus: Ethmia
- Species: E. gonimodes

Binomial name
- Ethmia gonimodes Meyrick, 1925

Species of moth

Ethmia gonimodes is a moth in the family Depressariidae. It was described by Edward Meyrick in 1925. It is found on Sumatra in Indonesia.
