= Ethmia wellingi =

Scientific classification
- Kingdom: Animalia
- Phylum: Arthropoda
- Clade: Pancrustacea
- Class: Insecta
- Order: Lepidoptera
- Family: Depressariidae
- Genus: Ethmia
- Species: E. wellingi

Binomial name
- Ethmia wellingi Powell, 1973

Species of moth

Ethmia wellingi is a moth in the family Depressariidae. It is found in Mexico. Records from Costa Rica refer to Ethmia stephenrumseyi.

The length of the forewings is 13.4–16.4 mm (0.53–0.65 in). The ground color of the forewings is white, with distinctly defined, dark brownish black markings reflecting greenish blue. The ground color of the hindwings is whitish, becoming pale brownish on the distal half.
