= Ethmia orestella =

Scientific classification
- Kingdom: Animalia
- Phylum: Arthropoda
- Clade: Pancrustacea
- Class: Insecta
- Order: Lepidoptera
- Family: Depressariidae
- Genus: Ethmia
- Species: E. orestella

Binomial name
- Ethmia orestella Powell, 1973

Species of moth

Ethmia orestella is a moth in the family Depressariidae. It is found in Colorado, United States.

The length of the forewings is 9.2–9.9 mm (0.36–0.39 in). The ground color of the forewings is uniform dull gray-brown with a longitudinal pale streak. The ground color of the hindwings is smoky brown, slightly paler than the forewings.
