= Ethmia umbrimarginella =

Scientific classification
- Domain: Eukaryota
- Kingdom: Animalia
- Phylum: Arthropoda
- Class: Insecta
- Order: Lepidoptera
- Family: Depressariidae
- Genus: Ethmia
- Species: E. umbrimarginella

Binomial name
- Ethmia umbrimarginella Busck, 1907

Species of moth

Ethmia umbrimarginella is a moth in the family Depressariidae.

== Distribution ==
It is found in southern Arizona and New Mexico in the United States.

== Description ==
The length of the forewings is 9.5–9.7 mm (0.37–0.38 in). The ground color of the forewings is dark slate gray. The immediate costal edge is dirty white up to the distal one-fourth. The ground color of the hindwings is white, with a broad dark gray margin around the apical, terminal and dorsal areas. Adults have been recorded in February.
