= Ethmia vidua =

Scientific classification
- Domain: Eukaryota
- Kingdom: Animalia
- Phylum: Arthropoda
- Class: Insecta
- Order: Lepidoptera
- Family: Depressariidae
- Genus: Ethmia
- Species: E. vidua

Binomial name
- Ethmia vidua (Staudinger, 1879)

Synonyms
- Psecadia vidua Staudinger, 1879; Ethmia flavilaterella

Species of moth

Ethmia vidua is a moth in the family Depressariidae. It is found in Kazakhstan and Russia.

== Subspecies ==
- Ethmia vidua vidua (Kazakhstan)
- Ethmia vidua flavilaterella Danilevsky, 1975 (Russia: Central Siberia)
