= Ethmia hiemalis =

Scientific classification
- Domain: Eukaryota
- Kingdom: Animalia
- Phylum: Arthropoda
- Class: Insecta
- Order: Lepidoptera
- Family: Depressariidae
- Genus: Ethmia
- Species: E. hiemalis

Binomial name
- Ethmia hiemalis (Danilevsky, 1969)

Synonyms
- Dasyethmia hiemalis Danilevsky, 1969

Species of moth

Ethmia hiemalis is a moth in the family Depressariidae. It was described by Aleksandr Sergeievich Danilevsky in 1969. It is found in Kazakhstan.
