= Ethmia fritillella =

Scientific classification
- Kingdom: Animalia
- Phylum: Arthropoda
- Clade: Pancrustacea
- Class: Insecta
- Order: Lepidoptera
- Family: Depressariidae
- Genus: Ethmia
- Species: E. fritillella

Binomial name
- Ethmia fritillella Powell, 1973

Species of moth

Ethmia fritillella is a moth in the family Depressariidae. It is found in Brazil.

The length of the forewings is about 11 mm (0.43 in). The ground color of the forewings is brown, reflecting shining purplish and extensively marked with shining white. The ground color of the hindwings is white at the base and pale brownish beyond, becoming dark brown in the apical area.
