= Ethmia clava =

Scientific classification
- Kingdom: Animalia
- Phylum: Arthropoda
- Clade: Pancrustacea
- Class: Insecta
- Order: Lepidoptera
- Family: Depressariidae
- Genus: Ethmia
- Species: E. clava

Binomial name
- Ethmia clava Powell, 1973

Species of moth

Ethmia clava is a moth in the family Depressariidae. It is found in Mexico.

The length of the forewings is 9.4–11 mm (0.37–0.43 in). The dorsal pale area of the forewings is gray, but narrowly white adjacent to the brown markings. The costal area is blackish brown. The ground color of the hindwings is dark gray-brown.
