= Ethmia asbolarcha =

Scientific classification
- Kingdom: Animalia
- Phylum: Arthropoda
- Class: Insecta
- Order: Lepidoptera
- Family: Depressariidae
- Genus: Ethmia
- Species: E. asbolarcha

Binomial name
- Ethmia asbolarcha Meyrick, 1938

Species of moth

Ethmia asbolarcha is a moth in the family Depressariidae. It was described by Edward Meyrick in 1938. It is found in Yunnan, China.
