= Ethmia phoenicura =

Scientific classification
- Kingdom: Animalia
- Phylum: Arthropoda
- Class: Insecta
- Order: Lepidoptera
- Family: Depressariidae
- Genus: Ethmia
- Species: E. phoenicura

Binomial name
- Ethmia phoenicura Meyrick, 1932

Species of moth

Ethmia phoenicura is a moth in the family Depressariidae. It is found in Baja California.

The length of the forewings is 7–13.2 mm (0.28–0.52 in). The ground color of the forewings is shining white with blackish brown markings, reflecting greenish blue. The ground color of the hindwings is brown, but the anal area is paler. Adults are on wing from late August to early January.
