= Ethmia subsidiaris =

Scientific classification
- Kingdom: Animalia
- Phylum: Arthropoda
- Class: Insecta
- Order: Lepidoptera
- Family: Depressariidae
- Genus: Ethmia
- Species: E. subsidiaris

Binomial name
- Ethmia subsidiaris Meyrick, 1935

Species of moth

Ethmia subsidiaris is a moth in the family Depressariidae. It was described by Edward Meyrick in 1935. It is found in Jiangsu, China.
