= Ethmia chalcodora =

Scientific classification
- Kingdom: Animalia
- Phylum: Arthropoda
- Class: Insecta
- Order: Lepidoptera
- Family: Depressariidae
- Genus: Ethmia
- Species: E. chalcodora

Binomial name
- Ethmia chalcodora Meyrick, 1912

Species of moth

Ethmia chalcodora is a moth in the family Depressariidae. It is found in northern Argentina and Paraguay.

The length of the forewings is about 9.6 mm (0.38 in). The ground color of the forewings is white, with dark brown markings, reflecting metallic steel-blue. The ground color of the hindwings is white, but brown at the apex. Adults have been recorded in October.
