= Ethmia hieroglyphica =

Scientific classification
- Kingdom: Animalia
- Phylum: Arthropoda
- Clade: Pancrustacea
- Class: Insecta
- Order: Lepidoptera
- Family: Depressariidae
- Genus: Ethmia
- Species: E. hieroglyphica

Binomial name
- Ethmia hieroglyphica Powell, 1973

Species of moth

Ethmia hieroglyphica is a moth in the family Depressariidae. It is found in Bolivia.

The length of the forewings is about 13 mm (0.51 in). The ground color of the forewings is white, with black markings. The ground color of the hindwings is subhyaline (partially glassy) white, becoming pale brownish in the apical area.
