= Ethmia pullata =

Scientific classification
- Kingdom: Animalia
- Phylum: Arthropoda
- Class: Insecta
- Order: Lepidoptera
- Family: Depressariidae
- Genus: Ethmia
- Species: E. pullata

Binomial name
- Ethmia pullata Meyrick, 1910

Species of moth

Ethmia pullata is a moth in the family Depressariidae. It was described by Edward Meyrick in 1910. It is found on the Solomon Islands.

The wingspan is 30–34 mm (1.2–1.3 in). Adults are similar to Ethmia praeclara, but the forewings are shorter and broader and there are ten more quadrate marginal dots. The hindwings have a much larger apical patch which is extended on the termen as a narrow streak to the middle.
