= Ethmia virilisca =

Scientific classification
- Kingdom: Animalia
- Phylum: Arthropoda
- Clade: Pancrustacea
- Class: Insecta
- Order: Lepidoptera
- Family: Depressariidae
- Genus: Ethmia
- Species: E. virilisca

Binomial name
- Ethmia virilisca Powell, 1985

Species of moth

Ethmia virilisca is a moth in the family Depressariidae. It is found in the Australian state of Western Australia.
