= Ethmia elimatella =

Scientific classification
- Domain: Eukaryota
- Kingdom: Animalia
- Phylum: Arthropoda
- Class: Insecta
- Order: Lepidoptera
- Family: Depressariidae
- Genus: Ethmia
- Species: E. elimatella

Binomial name
- Ethmia elimatella Danilevsky, 1975

Species of moth

Ethmia elimatella is a moth in the family Depressariidae. It was described by Aleksandr Sergeievich Danilevsky in 1975. They can be found in Azerbaijan.
