= Ethmia jingdongensis =

Scientific classification
- Domain: Eukaryota
- Kingdom: Animalia
- Phylum: Arthropoda
- Class: Insecta
- Order: Lepidoptera
- Family: Depressariidae
- Genus: Ethmia
- Species: E. jingdongensis

Binomial name
- Ethmia jingdongensis Wang & Zheng, 1997

Species of moth

Ethmia jingdongensis is a moth in the family Depressariidae. It was described by Wang and Zheng in 1997. It is found in China.
