= Ethmia hamaxastra =

Scientific classification
- Kingdom: Animalia
- Phylum: Arthropoda
- Class: Insecta
- Order: Lepidoptera
- Family: Depressariidae
- Genus: Ethmia
- Species: E. hamaxastra

Binomial name
- Ethmia hamaxastra Meyrick, 1930

Species of moth

Ethmia hamaxastra is a moth in the family Depressariidae. It is found in South Africa.

The wingspan is about 28 mm (1.1 in).
