= Ethmia szabokyi =

Scientific classification
- Domain: Eukaryota
- Kingdom: Animalia
- Phylum: Arthropoda
- Class: Insecta
- Order: Lepidoptera
- Family: Depressariidae
- Genus: Ethmia
- Species: E. szabokyi

Binomial name
- Ethmia szabokyi Kun, 2001

Species of moth

Ethmia szabokyi is a moth in the family Depressariidae. It was described by Andras Kun in 2001. It is found in Nepal and India (Kumaon, Assam).
