= Ethmia wursteri =

Scientific classification
- Domain: Eukaryota
- Kingdom: Animalia
- Phylum: Arthropoda
- Class: Insecta
- Order: Lepidoptera
- Family: Depressariidae
- Genus: Ethmia
- Species: E. wursteri

Binomial name
- Ethmia wursteri Amsel, 1956

Species of moth

Ethmia wursteri is a moth in the family Depressariidae. It was described by Hans Georg Amsel in 1956. It is found in Jordan.
