= Ethmia bisignata =

Scientific classification
- Domain: Eukaryota
- Kingdom: Animalia
- Phylum: Arthropoda
- Class: Insecta
- Order: Lepidoptera
- Family: Depressariidae
- Genus: Ethmia
- Species: E. bisignata

Binomial name
- Ethmia bisignata Kun, 2002

Species of moth

Ethmia bisignata is a moth in the family Depressariidae. It was described by Andras Kun in 2002. It is found on Sulawesi in Indonesia.
