= Ethmia epilygella =

Scientific classification
- Kingdom: Animalia
- Phylum: Arthropoda
- Clade: Pancrustacea
- Class: Insecta
- Order: Lepidoptera
- Family: Depressariidae
- Genus: Ethmia
- Species: E. epilygella

Binomial name
- Ethmia epilygella Powell, 1973

Species of moth

Ethmia epilygella is a species of small, nocturnal moths belonging to the family Depressariidae. The species is found in Brazil, where it inhabits a variety of habitats including forests, deserts, and suburban areas. Adults of the species have a wingspan of about 9.6–10.3 mm (0.38–0.41 in) and are generally grayish-brown in color, with white or gray markings on the wings. The larvae of Ethmia epilygella feed on the leaves of plants in the family Onagraceae and can cause significant damage to these plants if their populations become abundant.

Despite its small size and relatively inconspicuous appearance, Ethmia epilygella is of interest to scientists because of its unusual biology and life cycle. The larvae of the species are known to produce a distinctive, sticky web that they use to protect themselves from predators and parasites. Additionally, the species is highly sensitive to changes in its environment, making it a useful indicator of ecological health.
