= Ethmia joviella =

Scientific classification
- Domain: Eukaryota
- Kingdom: Animalia
- Phylum: Arthropoda
- Class: Insecta
- Order: Lepidoptera
- Family: Depressariidae
- Genus: Ethmia
- Species: E. joviella

Binomial name
- Ethmia joviella Walsingham, 1897

Species of moth

Ethmia joviella is a moth in the family Depressariidae. It is found on the Caribbean islands of Dominica and Grenada.

The length of the forewings is 5.8–6.7 mm (0.23–0.26 in). The ground color of the forewings is white, the costal area broadly dusted with brownish gray. The markings are black. The ground color of the hindwings is gray-brown. Adults are on wing in February, March and July in Dominica. There are multiple generations per year.
