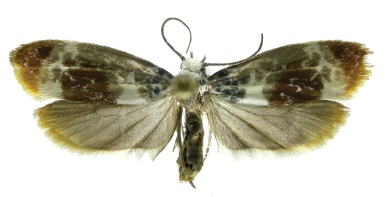

Scientific classification
- Kingdom: Animalia
- Phylum: Arthropoda
- Class: Insecta
- Order: Lepidoptera
- Family: Depressariidae
- Genus: Ethmia
- Species: E. mnesicosma

Binomial name
- Ethmia mnesicosma Meyrick, 1924

Synonyms
- Ethmia ornata Busck, 1934

= Ethmia mnesicosma =

Species of moth

Ethmia mnesicosma is a moth in the family Depressariidae. It is found from Mexico (both the east and west coast) to northern Venezuela and Trinidad. There is also a record from southern Brazil.

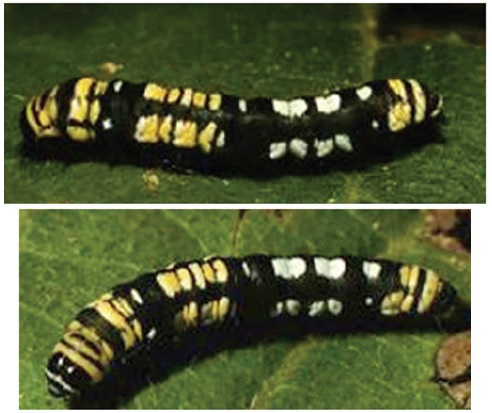
Larva

The length of the forewings is 7–8.8 mm (0.28–0.35 in). The ground color of the forewings is white, basally heavily spotted with shining gray or silver-blue on both the costal and dorsal areas. The ground color of the hindwings is whitish at the base, becoming brown towards the margins. Adults are on wing in February (in Trinidad), in May (in San Salvador and Yucatán), from June to July (in Veracruz), from July to August (in Sinaloa and Sonora), in November (in Venezuela) and in December (in Oaxaca).

The larvae feed on Cordia alliodora.
