= Ethmia argopa =

Scientific classification
- Kingdom: Animalia
- Phylum: Arthropoda
- Class: Insecta
- Order: Lepidoptera
- Family: Depressariidae
- Genus: Ethmia
- Species: E. argopa

Binomial name
- Ethmia argopa Meyrick, 1910

Species of moth

Ethmia argopa is a moth in the family Depressariidae. It was described by Edward Meyrick in 1910. It is found in Malaysia.

The wingspan is 32–34 mm (1.3–1.3 in). Adults are similar to Ethmia praeclara, but the forewings are broader, the black dots are larger and there are nine marginal dots. The hindwings are ochreous yellow.
