= Ethmia decaryanum =

Scientific classification
- Kingdom: Animalia
- Phylum: Arthropoda
- Class: Insecta
- Order: Lepidoptera
- Family: Depressariidae
- Genus: Ethmia
- Species: E. decaryanum

Binomial name
- Ethmia decaryanum (Viette, 1954)

Synonyms
- Trichocirca decaryanum Viette, 1954

Species of moth

Ethmia decaryanum is a moth in the family Depressariidae. It is found in Madagascar.
