= Ethmia albifrontella =

Scientific classification
- Kingdom: Animalia
- Phylum: Arthropoda
- Class: Insecta
- Order: Lepidoptera
- Family: Depressariidae
- Genus: Ethmia
- Species: E. albifrontella

Binomial name
- Ethmia albifrontella Sattler, 1967

Species of moth

Ethmia albifrontella is a moth in the Ethmiinae subfamily. It was described by Sattler in 1967. It is found in Afghanistan (Nuristan) and western Pakistan (Rawalpindi).
