= Ethmia pala =

Scientific classification
- Kingdom: Animalia
- Phylum: Arthropoda
- Clade: Pancrustacea
- Class: Insecta
- Order: Lepidoptera
- Family: Depressariidae
- Genus: Ethmia
- Species: E. pala

Binomial name
- Ethmia pala Powell, 1973

Species of moth

Ethmia pala is a moth in the family Depressariidae. It is found along the west coast of Mexico.

The length of the forewings is 6.5–7.4 mm (0.26–0.29 in). The pattern on the forewings is divided by a strongly sinuate (wavy) line, with the rounded lobes from the dark costal half extending about halfway from the Cu to the dorsal margin, at the basal one-fourth and the beyond middle and nearly to the margin at the tornus. The ground color of the hindwings is uniform gray-brown.
