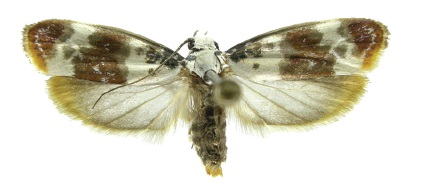

Scientific classification
- Domain: Eukaryota
- Kingdom: Animalia
- Phylum: Arthropoda
- Class: Insecta
- Order: Lepidoptera
- Family: Depressariidae
- Genus: Ethmia
- Species: E. phylacis

Binomial name
- Ethmia phylacis Walsingham, 1912

Synonyms
- Ethmia ornata Busck, 1934

= Ethmia phylacis =

Species of moth

Ethmia phylacis is a moth in the family Depressariidae. It is found in Mexico, Costa Rica and Cuba. The habitat consists of dry forests.

The length of the forewings is 8.7–12 mm (0.34–0.47 in). The ground color of the forewings is white, the costal area on the basal one-fifth densely spotted with dark gray brown, blending to metallic green. The ground color of the hindwings is whitish basally (becoming brownish before the margins) and ocherous at the distal margins including the fringe. Adults of subspecies phylacis are on wing from April to May (in Yucatán), in June (in Chiapas), in July (in Veracruz) and from July to August (in Sonora and Sinaloa). Adults of subspecies ornata have been recorded in August.

== Subspecies ==
- Ethmia phylacis phylacis (Mexico: southern Sonora and Sinaloa on the west coast to Veracruz and Yucatán on the east coast)
- Ethmia phylacis ornata (Busck, 1934) (Cuba)
