= Ethmia conglobata =

Scientific classification
- Kingdom: Animalia
- Phylum: Arthropoda
- Class: Insecta
- Order: Lepidoptera
- Family: Depressariidae
- Genus: Ethmia
- Species: E. conglobata

Binomial name
- Ethmia conglobata Meyrick, 1912

Species of moth

Ethmia conglobata is a moth in the family Depressariidae. It is found in Colombia.

The length of the forewings is 11.7–13.5 mm (0.46–0.53 in). The ground color of the forewings is whitish, largely replaced by brownish gray clouding except in the terminal area. The ground color of the hindwings is whitish basally, becoming pale brownish on the apical half. Adults have been recorded in November and May.
