= Ethmia cyrenaicella =

Scientific classification
- Domain: Eukaryota
- Kingdom: Animalia
- Phylum: Arthropoda
- Class: Insecta
- Order: Lepidoptera
- Family: Depressariidae
- Genus: Ethmia
- Species: E. cyrenaicella

Binomial name
- Ethmia cyrenaicella (Amsel, 1955)

Synonyms
- Psecadia cyrenaicella Amsel, 1955; Psecadia niveella Turati, 1934 (preocc.)

Species of insect

Ethmia cyrenaicella is a moth in the family Depressariidae. It was described by Hans Georg Amsel in 1955. It is found in Libya.
