= Ethmia ubsensis =

Scientific classification
- Domain: Eukaryota
- Kingdom: Animalia
- Phylum: Arthropoda
- Class: Insecta
- Order: Lepidoptera
- Family: Depressariidae
- Genus: Ethmia
- Species: E. ubsensis

Binomial name
- Ethmia ubsensis Zagulajev, 1975

Species of moth

Ethmia ubsensis is a moth in the family Depressariidae. It was described by Zagulajev in 1975. It is found in Mongolia.
