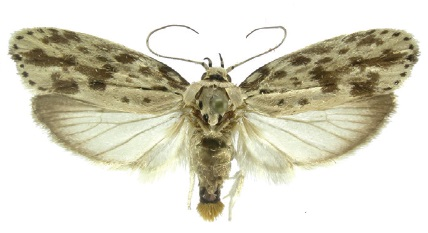

Scientific classification
- Domain: Eukaryota
- Kingdom: Animalia
- Phylum: Arthropoda
- Class: Insecta
- Order: Lepidoptera
- Family: Depressariidae
- Genus: Ethmia
- Species: E. hendersonorum

Binomial name
- Ethmia hendersonorum Phillips, 2014

= Ethmia hendersonorum =

Species of moth

Ethmia hendersonorum is a moth in the family Depressariidae. It is found in Costa Rica, where it has been recorded from the Caribbean slope at an altitude of 600 meters (2,000 ft). The habitat consists of dry forests.

The length of the forewings is 17.9–18.8 mm (0.70–0.74 in) for males and 18.8–19.7 mm (0.74–0.78 in) for females. The ground color of the forewings is yellowish, with a series of elongated dark markings and spots over the costal half. The dorsal area is paler with two dark spots. The hindwing ground colour is whitish becoming brownish toward the apex.

== Etymology ==
The species is named in honor of Carrol and Ethelle Henderson for their careers in non-game conservation in Minnesota and Costa Rica, and support for biodiversity-directed ecotourism of Costa Rica.
