= Ethmia namella =

Scientific classification
- Kingdom: Animalia
- Phylum: Arthropoda
- Clade: Pancrustacea
- Class: Insecta
- Order: Lepidoptera
- Family: Depressariidae
- Genus: Ethmia
- Species: E. namella

Binomial name
- Ethmia namella Mey, 2011

Species of moth

Ethmia namella is a moth in the family Depressariidae. It was described by Wolfram Mey in 2011. It is found in Namibia.
