= Ethmia cyanea =

Scientific classification
- Domain: Eukaryota
- Kingdom: Animalia
- Phylum: Arthropoda
- Class: Insecta
- Order: Lepidoptera
- Family: Depressariidae
- Genus: Ethmia
- Species: E. cyanea

Binomial name
- Ethmia cyanea Walsingham, 1912

Species of moth

Ethmia cyanea is a moth in the family Depressariidae. It is found in northern Veracruz in Mexico.

The length of the forewings is 8–9 mm (0.31–0.35 in). The ground color of the forewings is unicolorous, dark, shining greenish blue. The ground color of the hindwings (including fringe) is dark purple. Adults have been recorded in April and June.
