= Ethmia flavicaudata =

Scientific classification
- Domain: Eukaryota
- Kingdom: Animalia
- Phylum: Arthropoda
- Class: Insecta
- Order: Lepidoptera
- Family: Depressariidae
- Genus: Ethmia
- Species: E. flavicaudata

Binomial name
- Ethmia flavicaudata Walsingham, 1912

Species of moth

Ethmia flavicaudata is a moth in the family Depressariidae. It is found in southern Mexico.

The length of the forewings is about 10.5 mm (0.41 in). The ground color of the forewings is whitish, mostly replaced by brownish black. The ground color of the hindwings is semitranslucent whitish at the base, becoming brown in the apical area and at the margins. Adults are on wing in April, May and July.
