= Ethmia punctessa =

Scientific classification
- Kingdom: Animalia
- Phylum: Arthropoda
- Clade: Pancrustacea
- Class: Insecta
- Order: Lepidoptera
- Family: Depressariidae
- Genus: Ethmia
- Species: E. punctessa

Binomial name
- Ethmia punctessa Powell, 1973

Species of moth

Ethmia punctessa is a moth in the family Depressariidae. It is found in north-eastern Mexico.

The length of the forewings is 10.2–10.6 mm (0.40–0.42 in). The ground color of the forewings is white, with a few scattered brownish scales and a small brownish black spot at the end of the cell. The ground color of the hindwings is white basally, becoming pale brownish distally.
