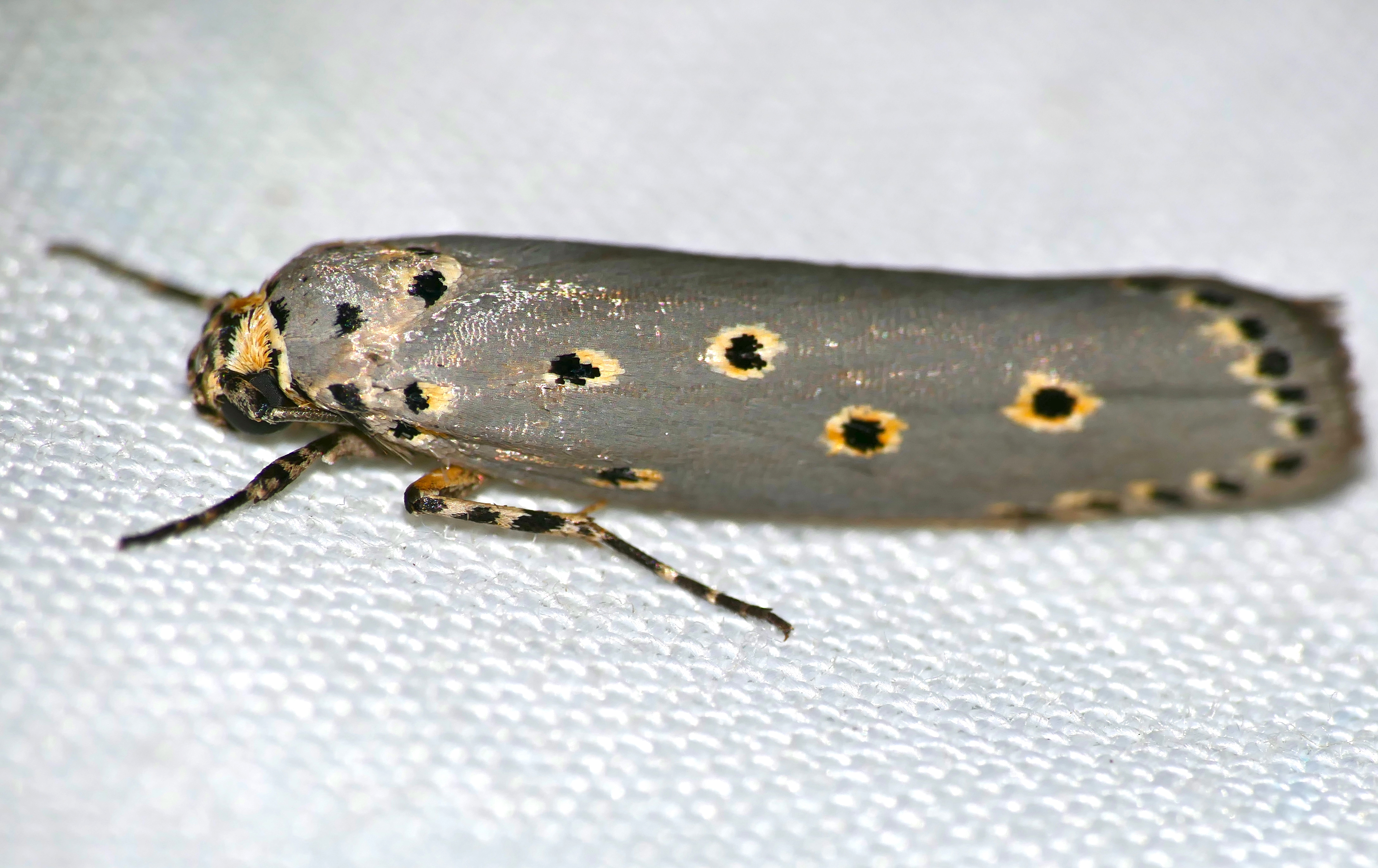

Scientific classification
- Kingdom: Animalia
- Phylum: Arthropoda
- Clade: Pancrustacea
- Class: Insecta
- Order: Lepidoptera
- Family: Depressariidae
- Genus: Ethmia
- Species: E. circumdatella

Binomial name
- Ethmia circumdatella (Walker, 1863)

Synonyms
- Hyponomeuta circumdatella Walker, 1863; Hyponomeuta circumdatellus Walker, 1863

= Ethmia circumdatella =

Species of moth

Ethmia circumdatella is a moth in the family Depressariidae. It is found in South Africa.
