= Ethmia afghana =

Scientific classification
- Domain: Eukaryota
- Kingdom: Animalia
- Phylum: Arthropoda
- Class: Insecta
- Order: Lepidoptera
- Family: Depressariidae
- Genus: Ethmia
- Species: E. afghana

Binomial name
- Ethmia afghana Sattler, 1967

Species of moth

Ethmia afghana is a moth in the family Depressariidae. It was described by Sattler in 1967. It is found in Afghanistan.
