= Ethmia bombina =

Scientific classification
- Kingdom: Animalia
- Phylum: Arthropoda
- Class: Insecta
- Order: Lepidoptera
- Family: Depressariidae
- Genus: Ethmia
- Species: E. bombina

Binomial name
- Ethmia bombina Sattler, 1967

Species of moth

Ethmia bombina is a moth in the family Depressariidae. It was described by Sattler in 1967. It is found in China (Sichuan).
