= Ethmia sattleri =

Scientific classification
- Domain: Eukaryota
- Kingdom: Animalia
- Phylum: Arthropoda
- Class: Insecta
- Order: Lepidoptera
- Family: Depressariidae
- Genus: Ethmia
- Species: E. sattleri

Binomial name
- Ethmia sattleri Kun, 2007

Species of moth

Ethmia sattleri is a moth in the family Depressariidae. It was described by Andras Kun in 2007. It is found in southern Iran.

== Etymology ==
The species is named for Dr Klaus Sattler, the author of the Ethmiidae volume of the Microlepidoptera Palaearctica series.
