= Ethmia autoschista =

Scientific classification
- Kingdom: Animalia
- Phylum: Arthropoda
- Class: Insecta
- Order: Lepidoptera
- Family: Depressariidae
- Genus: Ethmia
- Species: E. autoschista

Binomial name
- Ethmia autoschista Meyrick, 1932

Species of moth

Ethmia autoschista is a moth in the family Depressariidae. It was described by Edward Meyrick in 1932. It is found in Sichuan, China.
