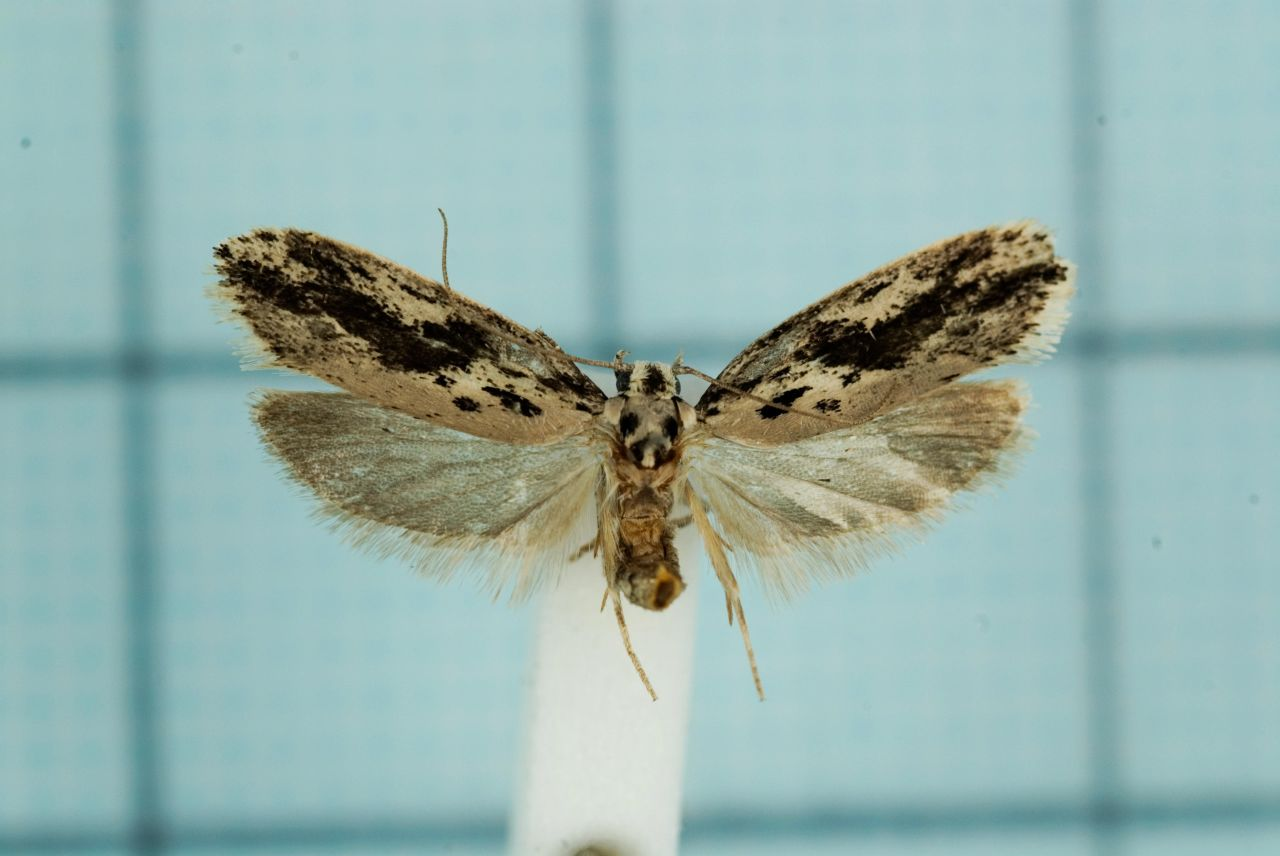

Scientific classification
- Domain: Eukaryota
- Kingdom: Animalia
- Phylum: Arthropoda
- Class: Insecta
- Order: Lepidoptera
- Family: Depressariidae
- Genus: Ethmia
- Species: E. pseudozygospila

Binomial name
- Ethmia pseudozygospila Kun & Szaboky, 2000

= Ethmia pseudozygospila =

Species of moth

Ethmia pseudozygospila is a moth in the family Depressariidae. It is found in China and Taiwan.

The wingspan is 14–16 mm (0.55–0.63 in).

The larvae feed on Ehretia dicksoni. They skeletonise the leaves of their host plant.
