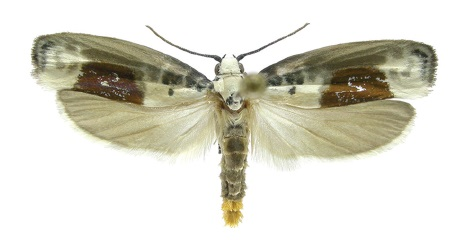

Scientific classification
- Domain: Eukaryota
- Kingdom: Animalia
- Phylum: Arthropoda
- Class: Insecta
- Order: Lepidoptera
- Family: Depressariidae
- Genus: Ethmia
- Species: E. millerorum

Binomial name
- Ethmia millerorum Phillips, 2014

= Ethmia millerorum =

Species of moth

Ethmia millerorum is a moth in the family Depressariidae. It is found in Costa Rica, where it has been recorded from 1,150 to 1,300 meters (3,770 to 4,270 ft) in the Cordillera Volcánica de Guanacaste. The habitat consists of rain forests.

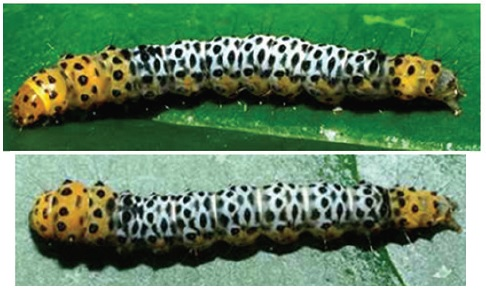
Larva

The length of the forewings is 10.9–11.9 mm (0.43–0.47 in). The ground color of the forewings is white with a large quadrate dorsal purplish coppery blotch at the posterior half from near the base to the tornus. The costal area has four blackish spots at the base and there is one distinct spot at the dorsum. The hindwing ground colour is whitish, but darker towards the margin.

The larvae feed on Bourreria costaricensis.

== Etymology ==
The species is named in honor of Kenton and Sue Miller for their lifetime encouragement and support of conservation of global biodiversity.
