= Ethmia dactylia =

Scientific classification
- Kingdom: Animalia
- Phylum: Arthropoda
- Class: Insecta
- Order: Lepidoptera
- Family: Depressariidae
- Genus: Ethmia
- Species: E. dactylia

Binomial name
- Ethmia dactylia Meyrick, 1912

Species of moth

Ethmia dactylia is a moth in the family Depressariidae. It is found in South Africa.
