= Ethmia judicialis =

Scientific classification
- Kingdom: Animalia
- Phylum: Arthropoda
- Class: Insecta
- Order: Lepidoptera
- Family: Depressariidae
- Genus: Ethmia
- Species: E. judicialis

Binomial name
- Ethmia judicialis Meyrick, 1921

Species of moth

Ethmia judicialis is a moth in the family Depressariidae. It is found in Zimbabwe.

The wingspan is about 24 mm (0.94 in). The forewings are grey-whitish with six large black dots: one beneath the costa near the base, three representing the stigmata, with the plical obliquely beyond the first discal, one midway between the plical and the base, and one midway between and rather above the first and second discal. There is an almost marginal series of nine smaller black dots around the posterior part of the costa and termen. The hindwings are whitish, tinged with grey posteriorly.
