= Ethmia coronata =

Scientific classification
- Domain: Eukaryota
- Kingdom: Animalia
- Phylum: Arthropoda
- Class: Insecta
- Order: Lepidoptera
- Family: Depressariidae
- Genus: Ethmia
- Species: E. coronata

Binomial name
- Ethmia coronata Walsingham, 1912

Synonyms
- Ethmia abdominella Busck, 1912

Species of moth

Ethmia coronata is a moth in the family Depressariidae. It is found in south-central Mexico.

The length of the forewings is 12.7–13.7 mm (0.50–0.54 in). The ground color of the forewings is dark gray, narrowly edged with white dorsally. The ground color of the hindwings is semitranslucent, white and reflecting purplish, becoming brownish in the apical area. Adults are on wing in June, September and October.
