= Ethmia namangana =

Scientific classification
- Domain: Eukaryota
- Kingdom: Animalia
- Phylum: Arthropoda
- Class: Insecta
- Order: Lepidoptera
- Family: Depressariidae
- Genus: Ethmia
- Species: E. namangana

Binomial name
- Ethmia namangana (Rebel, 1901)

Synonyms
- Psecadia namangana Rebel, 1901

Species of moth

Ethmia namangana is a moth in the family Depressariidae. It was described by Hans Rebel in 1901. It is found in Uzbekistan.

The wingspan is about 18 mm (0.71 in). The forewings are dark grey with three deep black spots. The hindwings are somewhat lighter.
