= Ethmia tyranthes =

Scientific classification
- Kingdom: Animalia
- Phylum: Arthropoda
- Clade: Pancrustacea
- Class: Insecta
- Order: Lepidoptera
- Family: Depressariidae
- Genus: Ethmia
- Species: E. tyranthes

Binomial name
- Ethmia tyranthes Meyrick, 1934

Species of moth

Ethmia tyranthes is a moth in the family Depressariidae. It is found in the Democratic Republic of Congo.
