= Ethmia zebrata =

Scientific classification
- Kingdom: Animalia
- Phylum: Arthropoda
- Clade: Pancrustacea
- Class: Insecta
- Order: Lepidoptera
- Family: Depressariidae
- Genus: Ethmia
- Species: E. zebrata

Binomial name
- Ethmia zebrata Powell, 1959

Species of moth

Ethmia zebrata is a moth in the family Depressariidae. It is found in Mexico.
