= Ethmia ermineella =

Scientific classification
- Kingdom: Animalia
- Phylum: Arthropoda
- Class: Insecta
- Order: Lepidoptera
- Family: Depressariidae
- Genus: Ethmia
- Species: E. ermineella

Binomial name
- Ethmia ermineella (Walsingham, 1880)

Synonyms
- Psecadia ermineella Walsingham, 1880; Ethmia euarithma Meyrick, 1924

Species of moth

Ethmia ermineella is a moth in the family Depressariidae. It was described by Thomas de Grey, 6th Baron Walsingham, in 1880. It is found in Tibet, Nepal (Tampa Khosi Tal), northern India (Punjab), Burma, northern Vietnam and western China (Yunnan, Sichuan).

The wingspan is about 23 mm (0.91 in). The forewings are grey-whitish with thirteen roundish or elongate black spots: one small near the base in the middle, two oblique from the costa at the base and one-sixth, one on the fold at one-fourth and the others forming three angulated transverse series of three spots each, the middle one of the second series most elongate. There are eleven large black marginal dots around the posterior part of the costa and termen. The hindwings are light grey, tinged with whitish anteriorly.
