= Ethmia penesella =

Scientific classification
- Domain: Eukaryota
- Kingdom: Animalia
- Phylum: Arthropoda
- Class: Insecta
- Order: Lepidoptera
- Family: Depressariidae
- Genus: Ethmia
- Species: E. penesella

Binomial name
- Ethmia penesella Kun & Szaboky, 2000

Species of moth

Ethmia penesella is a moth in the family Depressariidae. It is found in Japan and Taiwan.

The wingspan is 30–32 mm (1.2–1.3 in). The forewings are grey marked with ten black spots arranged into two main groups which contain five spots each. The hindwings are whitish grey with costal brushes.
