= Ethmia falkovitshi =

Scientific classification
- Kingdom: Animalia
- Phylum: Arthropoda
- Clade: Pancrustacea
- Class: Insecta
- Order: Lepidoptera
- Family: Depressariidae
- Genus: Ethmia
- Species: E. falkovitshi

Binomial name
- Ethmia falkovitshi Shovkoon, 2010

Species of moth

Ethmia falkovitshi is a moth in the family Depressariidae. It is found in Kazakhstan and Uzbekistan.
