= Ethmia pseustis =

Scientific classification
- Domain: Eukaryota
- Kingdom: Animalia
- Phylum: Arthropoda
- Class: Insecta
- Order: Lepidoptera
- Family: Depressariidae
- Genus: Ethmia
- Species: E. pseustis

Binomial name
- Ethmia pseustis Turner, 1942

Species of moth

Ethmia pseustis is a moth in the family Depressariidae. It is found in Australia, where it has been recorded from Queensland.
