= Ethmia volcanella =

Scientific classification
- Kingdom: Animalia
- Phylum: Arthropoda
- Clade: Pancrustacea
- Class: Insecta
- Order: Lepidoptera
- Family: Depressariidae
- Genus: Ethmia
- Species: E. volcanella

Binomial name
- Ethmia volcanella Powell, 1973

Species of moth

Ethmia volcanella is a moth in the family Depressariidae. It is found in Mexico and Guatemala.

The length of the forewings is 8.7–11.2 mm (0.34–0.44 in). The ground color of the forewings is gray, with a distinct white spur at the end of the cell, and marked with black. The ground color of the hindwings is pale pink, brightest in the anal area and becoming paler distally. The apical area is dark brownish.
