= Ethmia charybdis =

Scientific classification
- Kingdom: Animalia
- Phylum: Arthropoda
- Clade: Pancrustacea
- Class: Insecta
- Order: Lepidoptera
- Family: Depressariidae
- Genus: Ethmia
- Species: E. charybdis

Binomial name
- Ethmia charybdis Powell, 1973

Species of moth

Ethmia charybdis is a moth in the family Depressariidae. It is found in California, United States.

The length of the forewings is about 10.6 mm (0.42 in). The ground color of the forewings is gray, heavily overlaid with whitish, especially on the dorsal half. The ground color of the hindwings is pale gray.
