= Ethmia penyagolosella =

Scientific classification
- Domain: Eukaryota
- Kingdom: Animalia
- Phylum: Arthropoda
- Class: Insecta
- Order: Lepidoptera
- Family: Depressariidae
- Genus: Ethmia
- Species: E. penyagolosella

Binomial name
- Ethmia penyagolosella Domingo & Baixeras, 2003

Species of moth

Ethmia penyagolosella is a moth in the family Depressariidae. It is found in Spain.
