= Ethmia davisella =

Scientific classification
- Kingdom: Animalia
- Phylum: Arthropoda
- Clade: Pancrustacea
- Class: Insecta
- Order: Lepidoptera
- Family: Depressariidae
- Genus: Ethmia
- Species: E. davisella

Binomial name
- Ethmia davisella Powell, 1973

Species of moth

Ethmia davisella is a moth in the family Depressariidae. It is found in north-eastern Mexico.

The length of the forewings is 8–9.7 mm (0.31–0.38 in). The ground color of the forewings is shining white, with black markings, reflecting metallic blue. The ground color of the hindwings is whitish basally, but pale brownish over the distal one-third to one-half.
