= Ethmia sibirica =

Scientific classification
- Domain: Eukaryota
- Kingdom: Animalia
- Phylum: Arthropoda
- Class: Insecta
- Order: Lepidoptera
- Family: Depressariidae
- Genus: Ethmia
- Species: E. sibirica

Binomial name
- Ethmia sibirica Zagulajev, 1975

Species of moth

Ethmia sibirica is a moth in the family Depressariidae. It is found in the Russian Far East (East Sayan).
