= Ethmia vulcanica =

Scientific classification
- Domain: Eukaryota
- Kingdom: Animalia
- Phylum: Arthropoda
- Class: Insecta
- Order: Lepidoptera
- Family: Depressariidae
- Genus: Ethmia
- Species: E. vulcanica

Binomial name
- Ethmia vulcanica Kun, 2004

Species of moth

Ethmia vulcanica is a moth in the family Depressariidae. It is found in Namibia.
