= Ethmia antranella =

Scientific classification
- Kingdom: Animalia
- Phylum: Arthropoda
- Class: Insecta
- Order: Lepidoptera
- Family: Depressariidae
- Genus: Ethmia
- Species: E. antranella

Binomial name
- Ethmia antranella Viette, 1976

Species of moth

Ethmia antranella is a moth in the family Depressariidae. It was described by Viette in 1976. It is found in Madagascar.
