= Ethmia plaumanni =

Scientific classification
- Kingdom: Animalia
- Phylum: Arthropoda
- Clade: Pancrustacea
- Class: Insecta
- Order: Lepidoptera
- Family: Depressariidae
- Genus: Ethmia
- Species: E. plaumanni

Binomial name
- Ethmia plaumanni Powell, 1973

Species of moth

Ethmia plaumanni is a moth in the family Depressariidae. It is found in Brazil.

The length of the forewings is 9.3–10.3 mm (0.37–0.41 in). The ground color of the forewings is white, with unicolorous blackish brown markings which are nearly black, faintly reflecting steel bluish in spots. The ground color of the hindwings is white, but dark brown at the distal margins.
