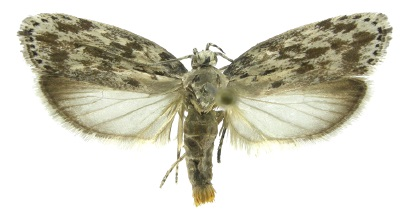

Scientific classification
- Kingdom: Animalia
- Phylum: Arthropoda
- Clade: Pancrustacea
- Class: Insecta
- Order: Lepidoptera
- Family: Depressariidae
- Genus: Ethmia
- Species: E. duckworthi

Binomial name
- Ethmia duckworthi Powell, 1973

= Ethmia duckworthi =

Species of moth

Ethmia duckworthi is a moth in the family Depressariidae. It is found in Panama and Costa Rica.

The length of the forewings is 11.9–13.4 mm (0.47–0.53 in). The ground color of the forewings is whitish, more or less uniformly covered by irregular, mostly ill-defined, dark brownish gray longitudinal streaks and spots. The ground color of the hindwings is semi-translucent whitish basally, becoming dark brown at the apical area and along the dorsal margin.
