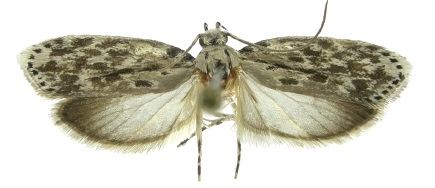

Scientific classification
- Domain: Eukaryota
- Kingdom: Animalia
- Phylum: Arthropoda
- Class: Insecta
- Order: Lepidoptera
- Family: Depressariidae
- Genus: Ethmia
- Species: E. ehakernae

Binomial name
- Ethmia ehakernae Phillips, 2014

= Ethmia ehakernae =

Species of moth

Ethmia ehakernae is a moth in the family Depressariidae. It is found in Costa Rica, where it has been recorded from altitudes between 700 and 1,300 meters (2,300 and 4,300 ft) on the Pacific side of the Cordillera de Guanacaste and Cordillera de Tilarán. The habitat consists of rain forests.

The length of the forewings is 9.1–9.8 mm (0.36–0.39 in) for males and 10.2–10.8 mm (0.40–0.43 in) for females. The ground color of the forewings is whitish, covered by irregular, dark brownish longitudinal streaks and spots. The posterior half before the middle and the terminal area is paler. There are two spots near the base of the posterior half, the inner one very small and the outer one distinct. The hindwing ground colour are whitish basally, becoming brownish at the apical area.

== Etymology ==
The species is named in honor of Eha Kern, for being one of the prime movers behind Children's Rainforest Sweden.
