= Ethmia susa =

Scientific classification
- Domain: Eukaryota
- Kingdom: Animalia
- Phylum: Arthropoda
- Class: Insecta
- Order: Lepidoptera
- Family: Depressariidae
- Genus: Ethmia
- Species: E. susa

Binomial name
- Ethmia susa Kun & Szabóky, 2000

Species of moth

Ethmia susa is a moth in the family Depressariidae. It is found in Taiwan. Adults are on wing from March to September.
