= Ethmia hiramella =

Scientific classification
- Kingdom: Animalia
- Phylum: Arthropoda
- Class: Insecta
- Order: Lepidoptera
- Family: Depressariidae
- Genus: Ethmia
- Species: E. hiramella

Binomial name
- Ethmia hiramella Busck, 1914

Species of moth

Ethmia hiramella is a moth in the family Depressariidae. It is found in Cuba.

The length of the forewings is 11.9–12 mm (0.47–0.47 in). The ground color of the forewings is white or pale cream-white, with brownish black markings reflecting metallic greenish blue. The ground color of the hindwings is semitranslucent white basally, becoming opaque ocherous on the distal half and brownish at the apex. Adults are on wing in April, June and October.
