= Ethmia powelli =

Scientific classification
- Kingdom: Animalia
- Phylum: Arthropoda
- Clade: Pancrustacea
- Class: Insecta
- Order: Lepidoptera
- Family: Depressariidae
- Genus: Ethmia
- Species: E. powelli

Binomial name
- Ethmia powelli Heppner, 1988

Species of moth

Ethmia powelli is a moth in the family Depressariidae. It is found in the Florida Keys in the United States.

The length of the forewings is 4–4.7 mm (0.16–0.19 in) for males and 4.1–4.9 mm (0.16–0.19 in) for females. Adults are on wing in June and August.
