= Ethmia galactarcha =

Scientific classification
- Kingdom: Animalia
- Phylum: Arthropoda
- Class: Insecta
- Order: Lepidoptera
- Family: Depressariidae
- Genus: Ethmia
- Species: E. galactarcha

Binomial name
- Ethmia galactarcha Meyrick, 1928

Species of moth

Ethmia galactarcha is a moth in the family Depressariidae. It was described by Edward Meyrick in 1928. It is found on Java, Sumatra, Flores and Sumbawa.
