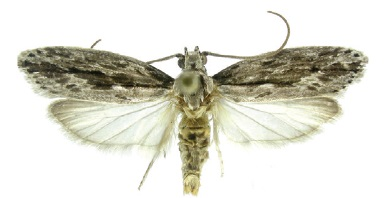

Scientific classification
- Domain: Eukaryota
- Kingdom: Animalia
- Phylum: Arthropoda
- Class: Insecta
- Order: Lepidoptera
- Family: Depressariidae
- Genus: Ethmia
- Species: E. laphamorum

Binomial name
- Ethmia laphamorum Phillips, 2014

= Ethmia laphamorum =

Species of moth

Ethmia laphamorum is a moth in the family Depressariidae. It is found in Costa Rica, where it has been recorded from both slopes of the Cordillera Volcánica de Guanacaste and Península de Nicoya at altitudes between 20 and 600 meters (66 and 1,969 ft). The habitat consists of dry forests.

The length of the forewings is 10.8–12 mm (0.43–0.47 in) for males and 11.1–12.7 mm (0.44–0.50 in) for females. The ground color of the forewings is brownish with irregular darker markings. There is an elongated dark mark in the posterior area, as well as an irregular black band from the base to the apex. The hindwings are whitish.

== Etymology ==
The species is named in honor of Nick and Gardiner Lapham for their support of Área de Conservación Guanacaste rain forest land purchase for permanent wildland conservation.
