= Ethmia burnsella =

Scientific classification
- Kingdom: Animalia
- Phylum: Arthropoda
- Clade: Pancrustacea
- Class: Insecta
- Order: Lepidoptera
- Family: Depressariidae
- Genus: Ethmia
- Species: E. burnsella

Binomial name
- Ethmia burnsella Powell, 1973

Species of moth

Ethmia burnsella is a moth in the family Depressariidae. It is found in the United States in northern Texas.

The length of the forewings is 10.2–11 mm (0.40–0.43 in). The ground color of the forewings is pale ochereous, although the costal area is pale gray-brown and distinctly paler than the brownish black spots of the dorsal half. The ground color of the hindwings is white basally, becoming pale ochereous distally and along the anal margin.
