= Ethmia shensicola =

Scientific classification
- Domain: Eukaryota
- Kingdom: Animalia
- Phylum: Arthropoda
- Class: Insecta
- Order: Lepidoptera
- Family: Depressariidae
- Genus: Ethmia
- Species: E. shensicola

Binomial name
- Ethmia shensicola Amsel, 1969

Species of moth

Ethmia shensicola is a moth in the family Depressariidae. It was described by Hans Georg Amsel in 1969. It is found in Shaanxi, China.
