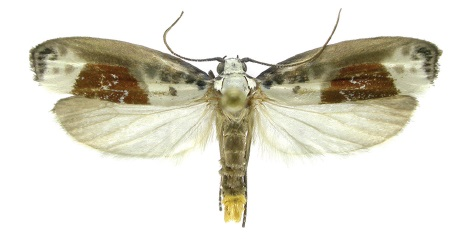

Scientific classification
- Domain: Eukaryota
- Kingdom: Animalia
- Phylum: Arthropoda
- Class: Insecta
- Order: Lepidoptera
- Family: Depressariidae
- Genus: Ethmia
- Species: E. terpnota

Binomial name
- Ethmia terpnota Walsingham, 1912

= Ethmia terpnota =

Species of moth

Ethmia terpnota is a moth in the family Depressariidae. It is found in Costa Rica, where it occurs at middle elevations (650 to 1,800 metres or 2,130 to 5,910 feet) on both slopes of Cordillera Volcánica de Guanacaste, Tilarán, Cordillera Volcánica Central and Talamanca. The habitat consists of rain forests.

The length of the forewings is 11.8–13.8 mm (0.46–0.54 in). The ground color of the forewings is white. The ground color of the hindwings is white, becoming pale brownish at apical margins. Adults are on wing in March and from October to November.
