= Ethmia palawana =

Scientific classification
- Kingdom: Animalia
- Phylum: Arthropoda
- Clade: Pancrustacea
- Class: Insecta
- Order: Lepidoptera
- Family: Depressariidae
- Genus: Ethmia
- Species: E. palawana

Binomial name
- Ethmia palawana Schultze, 1925

Species of moth

Ethmia palawana is a moth belonging to the Depressariidae family. It was described by Schultze in 1925. It is found in the Philippines (Palawan).
