= Ethmia subnigritaenia =

Scientific classification
- Kingdom: Animalia
- Phylum: Arthropoda
- Clade: Pancrustacea
- Class: Insecta
- Order: Lepidoptera
- Family: Depressariidae
- Genus: Ethmia
- Species: E. subnigritaenia

Binomial name
- Ethmia subnigritaenia Powell, 1973

Species of moth

Ethmia subnigritaenia is a moth in the family Depressariidae. It is found in Mexico.

The length of the forewings is 11.4–12.3 mm (0.45–0.48 in). The ground color of the forewings is whitish gray, infused with dark grayish clouding, slightly less so on the dorsal and terminal areas. The ground color of the hindwings is semitranslucent whitish, becoming pale brownish in the apical area.
