= Ethmia dehiscens =

Scientific classification
- Domain: Eukaryota
- Kingdom: Animalia
- Phylum: Arthropoda
- Class: Insecta
- Order: Lepidoptera
- Family: Depressariidae
- Genus: Ethmia
- Species: E. dehiscens

Binomial name
- Ethmia dehiscens Meyrick, 1924

Species of moth

Ethmia dehiscens is a moth in the family Depressariidae. It was described by Edward Meyrick in 1924. It is found in Sichuan, China.

The wingspan is about 31 mm (1.2 in). The forewings are pale grey with black markings, consisting of two small oval spots beneath the costa towards the base, an interrupted streak on the fold from the base to one third, a short mark on the dorsum at one-fourth and one towards the dorsum before the middle. The stigmata forms small spots, the plical obliquely beyond the first discal, with a streak projecting from the second discal to near the first. There are two interneural streaks above the cell before and beyond the middle of the wing and a sinuate transverse series of six posteriorly, not reaching the cell or margin, the first and fourth of these longest, the two lowest little marked. There is a marginal series of about eleven dots around the apical part of the costa and termen. The hindwings are pale grey.

== See also ==
- Glossary of entomology terms
