= Ethmia apispinata =

Scientific classification
- Kingdom: Animalia
- Phylum: Arthropoda
- Class: Insecta
- Order: Lepidoptera
- Family: Depressariidae
- Genus: Ethmia
- Species: E. apispinata

Binomial name
- Ethmia apispinata Wang & Wang, 2012

Species of moth

Ethmia apispinata is a moth in the family Depressariidae. It was described by Wang and Wang in 2012. It is found in China (Yunnan).
