= Ethmia leucocirrha =

Scientific classification
- Kingdom: Animalia
- Phylum: Arthropoda
- Class: Insecta
- Order: Lepidoptera
- Family: Depressariidae
- Genus: Ethmia
- Species: E. leucocirrha

Binomial name
- Ethmia leucocirrha Meyrick, 1926

Species of moth

Ethmia leucocirrha is a moth in the family Depressariidae. It is found in South Africa.

The wingspan is about 23 mm (0.91 in). The forewings are light ochreous-yellow overlaid with white and with small black dots beneath the costa near the base and at one-fourth. The stigmata is small and black, with the plical obliquely beyond the first discal, a similar dot is found midway between the plical and the base and the second discal is larger. The hindwings are pale yellowish overlaid with white.
