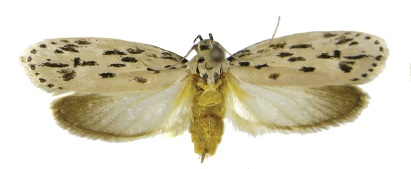

Scientific classification
- Kingdom: Animalia
- Phylum: Arthropoda
- Clade: Pancrustacea
- Class: Insecta
- Order: Lepidoptera
- Family: Depressariidae
- Genus: Ethmia
- Species: E. sandra

Binomial name
- Ethmia sandra Powell, 1973

= Ethmia sandra =

Species of moth

Ethmia sandra is a moth in the family Depressariidae. It is found from Mexico to El Salvador and Costa Rica.

The length of the forewings is 10–12.7 mm (0.39–0.50 in). The ground color of the forewings is uniform pale gray, at times with an irregular, whitish clouding around markings. These markings are black, longitudinally elongate spots. The ground color of the hindwings is semitranslucent whitish, becoming brown at the margins beyond the middle and in the apical area.
