= Ethmia heliomela =

Scientific classification
- Domain: Eukaryota
- Kingdom: Animalia
- Phylum: Arthropoda
- Class: Insecta
- Order: Lepidoptera
- Family: Depressariidae
- Genus: Ethmia
- Species: E. heliomela

Binomial name
- Ethmia heliomela Lower, 1923

Synonyms
- Ethmia olbista Turner, 1923

Species of moth

Ethmia heliomela is a moth in the family Depressariidae. It is found in Australia in southern Queensland and northern New South Wales.

The wingspan is about 30 mm (1.2 in).
