= Ethmia lybiella =

Scientific classification
- Domain: Eukaryota
- Kingdom: Animalia
- Phylum: Arthropoda
- Class: Insecta
- Order: Lepidoptera
- Family: Depressariidae
- Genus: Ethmia
- Species: E. lybiella

Binomial name
- Ethmia lybiella (Ragonot, 1892)

Synonyms
- Psecadia lybiella Ragonot, 1892; Psecadia libyella var. biskraella Chrétien, 1915; Ethmia trimaculella Lucas, 1943

Species of moth

Ethmia lybiella is a moth in the family Depressariidae. It was described by Ragonot in 1892. It is found in Algeria, Tunisia, Libya and Palestine.
