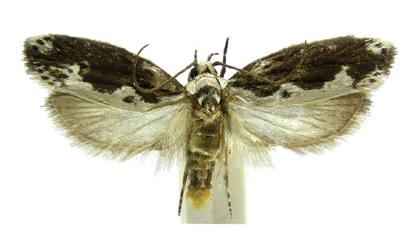

Scientific classification
- Domain: Eukaryota
- Kingdom: Animalia
- Phylum: Arthropoda
- Class: Insecta
- Order: Lepidoptera
- Family: Depressariidae
- Genus: Ethmia
- Species: E. miriamschulmanae

Binomial name
- Ethmia miriamschulmanae Phillips, 2014

= Ethmia miriamschulmanae =

Species of moth

Ethmia miriamschulmanae is a moth in the family Depressariidae. It is found in Costa Rica, where it has been recorded from the Pacific side of the Cordillera Volcánica de Guanacaste and on the Península de Nicoya at altitudes ranging from 25 to 700 meters (82 to 2,297 ft). The habitat consists of dry forests.

The length of the forewings is 10.3–10.5 mm (0.41–0.41 in) for males and 10.5–10.7 mm (0.41–0.42 in) for females. The costal half of the forewings is dark brown from the base to the termen, except for the apex, which is white enclosing two dots on the terminal line. The longitudinal line separates a dark costal half from the paler posterior half. There is a brown spot on the base at the premedial line. The hindwing ground color is whitish, getting dark towards the apical margin.

The larvae feed on Varronia guanacastensis.

== Etymology ==
The species is named in honor of Miriam Schulman for her support of the beginning and growth of Área de Conservación Guanacaste.
