= Ethmia soljanikovi =

Scientific classification
- Domain: Eukaryota
- Kingdom: Animalia
- Phylum: Arthropoda
- Class: Insecta
- Order: Lepidoptera
- Family: Depressariidae
- Genus: Ethmia
- Species: E. soljanikovi

Binomial name
- Ethmia soljanikovi Danilevsky & Zaguljaev, 1975

Species of moth

Ethmia soljanikovi is a moth in the family Depressariidae. It is found in Mongolia and Russia (Tuva, Altai).

Adults have been recorded from early July to early August.
