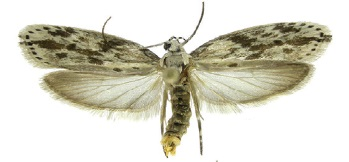

Scientific classification
- Domain: Eukaryota
- Kingdom: Animalia
- Phylum: Arthropoda
- Class: Insecta
- Order: Lepidoptera
- Family: Depressariidae
- Genus: Ethmia
- Species: E. lesliesaulae

Binomial name
- Ethmia lesliesaulae Phillips, 2014

= Ethmia lesliesaulae =

Species of moth

Ethmia lesliesaulae is a moth in the family Depressariidae. It is found in Costa Rica, where it has been recorded from both sides of the Cordillera Volcánica de Guanacaste al altitudes ranging from 300 to 645 meters (984 to 2,116 ft). The habitat consists of rain forests.

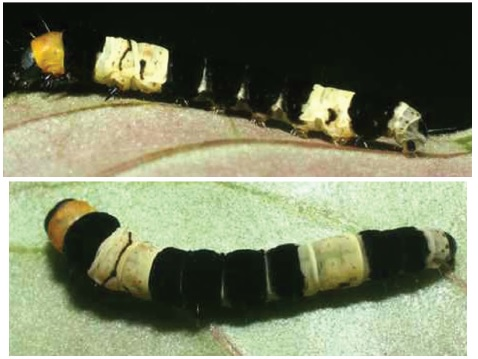
Larva

The length of the forewings is 8.4–10.3 mm (0.33–0.41 in) for males and 8.9–10.4 mm (0.35–0.41 in) for females. The ground color of the forewings is whitish, with blackish markings and two distinct spots at the base, as well as an oblique dark blotch from before the middle of the costa connecting with an elongated dark mark from the middle to the termen. The hindwing ground colour is whitish, but darker at the margins.

The larvae feed on Drymonia macrophylla, Drymonia serrulata, Drymonia warszewicziana and Drymonia alloplectoides.

== Etymology ==
The species is named in honor of Leslie Saul.
