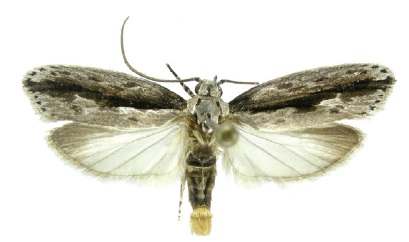

Scientific classification
- Kingdom: Animalia
- Phylum: Arthropoda
- Clade: Pancrustacea
- Class: Insecta
- Order: Lepidoptera
- Family: Depressariidae
- Genus: Ethmia
- Species: E. nigritaenia

Binomial name
- Ethmia nigritaenia Powell, 1973

= Ethmia nigritaenia =

Species of moth

Ethmia nigritaenia is a moth in the family Depressariidae. It is found from southern Mexico, Guatemala and Honduras to north-western Costa Rica.

The length of the forewings is 10.4–14 mm (0.41–0.55 in). The ground color of the forewings is whitish gray, clouded with pale brownish gray except at the terminal margin. The ground color of the hindwings is semitranslucent white, becoming pale brownish at the distal margins.

The larvae feed on Cordia gerascanthus.
