= Ethmia kabulica =

Scientific classification
- Domain: Eukaryota
- Kingdom: Animalia
- Phylum: Arthropoda
- Class: Insecta
- Order: Lepidoptera
- Family: Depressariidae
- Genus: Ethmia
- Species: E. kabulica

Binomial name
- Ethmia kabulica Amsel, 1969

Species of moth

Ethmia kabulica is a moth in the family Depressariidae. It was described by Hans Georg Amsel in 1969. It is found in Afghanistan.
