= Ethmia ogovensis =

Scientific classification
- Domain: Eukaryota
- Kingdom: Animalia
- Phylum: Arthropoda
- Class: Insecta
- Order: Lepidoptera
- Family: Depressariidae
- Genus: Ethmia
- Species: E. ogovensis

Binomial name
- Ethmia ogovensis Strand, 1913

Species of moth

Ethmia ogovensis is a moth in the family Depressariidae. It is found in Africa.
