= Ethmia persica =

Scientific classification
- Domain: Eukaryota
- Kingdom: Animalia
- Phylum: Arthropoda
- Class: Insecta
- Order: Lepidoptera
- Family: Depressariidae
- Genus: Ethmia
- Species: E. persica

Binomial name
- Ethmia persica Kun, 2007

Species of moth

Ethmia persica is a moth in the family Depressariidae. It was described by Andras Kun in 2007. It is found in Iran.
