= Ethmia iphicrates =

Scientific classification
- Kingdom: Animalia
- Phylum: Arthropoda
- Class: Insecta
- Order: Lepidoptera
- Family: Depressariidae
- Genus: Ethmia
- Species: E. iphicrates

Binomial name
- Ethmia iphicrates Meyrick, 1922

Species of moth

Ethmia iphicrates is a moth in the family Depressariidae first described by Edward Meyrick in 1922. It is found in Kenya.

The wingspan is about 28 mm (1.1 in). The forewings are white with black markings: an irregular elongate spot along the basal fifth of the costa, an irregular transverse fasciate blotch from the dorsum at one-fourth, its apex reaching the extremity of this and a streak along the dorsum from this to three-fourths, with an irregular projection before the middle. There is a broad irregular converging fasciae from the costa before the middle and at four-fifths uniting below the middle and continued to the dorsum at two-thirds. There is a large dot beneath the costa beyond the middle, and sometimes a slender costal streak between these. There is also a transverse fasciate subterminal blotch confluent above with the preceding fascia, and also confluent with a triangular apical spot. There is a large pre-tornal dot, and a marginal series around the posterior part of the costa and termen. The hindwings are grey.
