= Ethmia howdeni =

Scientific classification
- Kingdom: Animalia
- Phylum: Arthropoda
- Clade: Pancrustacea
- Class: Insecta
- Order: Lepidoptera
- Family: Depressariidae
- Genus: Ethmia
- Species: E. howdeni

Binomial name
- Ethmia howdeni Powell, 1973

Species of moth

Ethmia howdeni is a moth in the family Depressariidae. It is native to Mexico and Central America.

The length of the forewings is 8.6–11.4 mm (0.34–0.45 in). The ground color of the forewings is off-white, irregularly and indistinctly blotched with pale gray to almost entirely pale grayish. The ground color of the hindwings is semitranslucent off-white basally, becoming pale brownish in the apical area and along the hind margin.
