= Ethmia playa =

Scientific classification
- Kingdom: Animalia
- Phylum: Arthropoda
- Clade: Pancrustacea
- Class: Insecta
- Order: Lepidoptera
- Family: Depressariidae
- Genus: Ethmia
- Species: E. playa

Binomial name
- Ethmia playa Powell, 1973

Species of moth

Ethmia playa is a moth in the family Depressariidae. It is found in Mexico, where it is abundant in the northern, desert-scrub portion of the Sinaloan thorn forest, flying at the beginning of the rainy season.

The length of the forewings is 5.2–6.5 mm (0.20–0.26 in). The pattern of the forewings is divided by a longitudinal line. The costal half is grayish brown, darkest basally and near the line. The dorsal area is whitish, usually tinged with grayish or tan. The ground color of the hindwings is gray, becoming paler basally.
