= Ethmia cellicoma =

Scientific classification
- Kingdom: Animalia
- Phylum: Arthropoda
- Class: Insecta
- Order: Lepidoptera
- Family: Depressariidae
- Genus: Ethmia
- Species: E. cellicoma

Binomial name
- Ethmia cellicoma Meyrick, 1931

Species of moth

Ethmia cellicoma is a moth in the family Depressariidae. It is found in Paraguay.

The length of the forewings is about 8.4 mm (0.33 in). The ground color of the forewings is whitish gray, although the costal edge is whitish toward the middle. The ground color of the hindwings is white, the apex suffused with pale gray.
