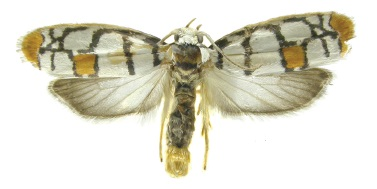

Scientific classification
- Domain: Eukaryota
- Kingdom: Animalia
- Phylum: Arthropoda
- Class: Insecta
- Order: Lepidoptera
- Family: Depressariidae
- Genus: Ethmia
- Species: E. festiva

Binomial name
- Ethmia festiva Busck, 1914

Synonyms
- Ethmia xantholitha Meyrick, 1928

= Ethmia festiva =

Species of moth

Ethmia festiva is a moth in the family Depressariidae. It is found from south-eastern Mexico, Costa Rica and Guatemala to northern Colombia.

The length of the forewings is 8.3–10 mm (0.33–0.39 in). The ground color of the forewings is white with distinct brownish black lines which reflect bluish. The ground color of the hindwings is whitish, becoming brownish apically. Adults are on wing from late March to May (in Yucatán and Panama), in July (Oaxaca and Nicaragua) and in July and October (in Colombia).
