= Ethmia mongolica =

Scientific classification
- Domain: Eukaryota
- Kingdom: Animalia
- Phylum: Arthropoda
- Class: Insecta
- Order: Lepidoptera
- Family: Depressariidae
- Genus: Ethmia
- Species: E. mongolica

Binomial name
- Ethmia mongolica (Rebel, 1901)

Synonyms
- Psecadia mongolica Rebel, 1901

Species of moth

Ethmia mongolica is a moth in the family Depressariidae. It was described by Hans Rebel in 1901. It is found in Mongolia, Tibet and China (Gansu, Sichuan).

The wingspan is about 20 mm (0.79 in). The forewings are fuliginous black with four black spots. The hindwings are deep fuliginous brown.
