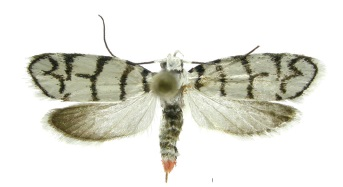

Scientific classification
- Kingdom: Animalia
- Phylum: Arthropoda
- Clade: Pancrustacea
- Class: Insecta
- Order: Lepidoptera
- Family: Depressariidae
- Genus: Ethmia
- Species: E. chemsaki

Binomial name
- Ethmia chemsaki Powell, 1959

= Ethmia chemsaki =

Species of moth

Ethmia chemsaki is a moth in the family Depressariidae. It is found from Puebla, Mexico to northern Costa Rica, where it has been collected on the Pacific slope of Cordillera de Guanacaste at altitudes ranging from 20 to 300 meters (66 to 984 ft).
