= Ethmia anthracopis =

Scientific classification
- Kingdom: Animalia
- Phylum: Arthropoda
- Class: Insecta
- Order: Lepidoptera
- Family: Depressariidae
- Genus: Ethmia
- Species: E. anthracopis

Binomial name
- Ethmia anthracopis (Meyrick, 1902)

Synonyms
- Psecadia anthracopis Meyrick, 1902

Species of moth

Ethmia anthracopis is a moth in the family Depressariidae. It is found in Australia, where it has been recorded from South Australia.

The wingspan is about 25 mm (0.98 in). The forewings are shining white, with blackish-fuscous markings. The costal edge is blackish-fuscous, interrupted near the apex and there is a small costal spot at the base, as well as a larger one near the base, partly connected. There is also a small dorsal spot at one-sixth and a transverse bar from the costa at one-fifth, thickened upwards, reaching three-fourths across wing, interrupted on the fold. There is a triangular spot on the costa at two-fifths, its apex touching a discal dot. A small subdorsal spot is found before the middle and there is a small costal spot beyond the middle, as well as a subcrescentic spot towards the dorsum beyond the middle and an elongate spot along the costa at three-fourths, containing two white dots. The terminal streak is narrow. The hindwings are white, thinly scaled and the costa and apical fifth are fuscous.
