= Ethmia nykta =

Scientific classification
- Kingdom: Animalia
- Phylum: Arthropoda
- Clade: Pancrustacea
- Class: Insecta
- Order: Lepidoptera
- Family: Depressariidae
- Genus: Ethmia
- Species: E. nykta

Binomial name
- Ethmia nykta Shovkoon, 2010

Species of moth

Ethmia nykta is a moth in the family Depressariidae. It is found in south-western Sichuan, China.
