= Ethmia baihua =

Scientific classification
- Domain: Eukaryota
- Kingdom: Animalia
- Phylum: Arthropoda
- Class: Insecta
- Order: Lepidoptera
- Family: Depressariidae
- Genus: Ethmia
- Species: E. baihua

Binomial name
- Ethmia baihua Yang, 1977

Species of moth

Ethmia baihua is a moth in the family Depressariidae. It was described by Yang in 1977. It is found in northern China.
