= Ethmia trifida =

Scientific classification
- Domain: Eukaryota
- Kingdom: Animalia
- Phylum: Arthropoda
- Class: Insecta
- Order: Lepidoptera
- Family: Depressariidae
- Genus: Ethmia
- Species: E. trifida

Binomial name
- Ethmia trifida Kun, 2004

Species of moth

Ethmia trifida is a moth in the family Depressariidae. It was described by Andras Kun in 2004. It is found in Myanmar, Thailand, the Philippines and on Borneo and Sumatra.
