= Ethmia calumniella =

Scientific classification
- Kingdom: Animalia
- Phylum: Arthropoda
- Clade: Pancrustacea
- Class: Insecta
- Order: Lepidoptera
- Family: Depressariidae
- Genus: Ethmia
- Species: E. calumniella

Binomial name
- Ethmia calumniella Powell, 1973

Species of moth

Ethmia calumniella is a moth in the family Depressariidae. It is found in Brazil.

The length of the forewings is about 11.4 mm (0.45 in). The ground color of the forewings is white, with blackish brown markings. The ground color of the hindwings is subhyaline (not quite glassy) whitish, but dark brown at the distal margin and along the veins approaching the terminal margin.
