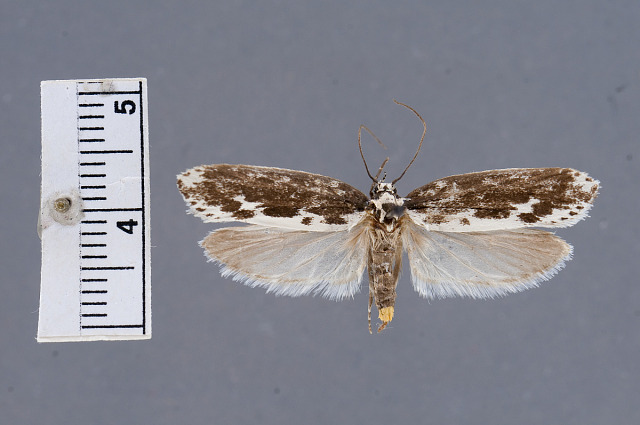

Scientific classification
- Kingdom: Animalia
- Phylum: Arthropoda
- Class: Insecta
- Order: Lepidoptera
- Family: Depressariidae
- Genus: Ethmia
- Species: E. gigantea

Binomial name
- Ethmia gigantea Busck, 1914

= Ethmia gigantea =

Species of moth

Ethmia gigantea is a moth in the family Depressariidae. It is found in Mexico.

The length of the forewings is 14.6–17.5 millimetres (0.57–0.69 in). The ground color of the forewings is dark brownish black, nearly unicolorous on the costal half. The ground color of the hindwings is whitish, semi-translucent basally, becoming pale brownish on the apical half. Adults have been recorded in April, June and August.
