= Ethmia marmorea =

Scientific classification
- Domain: Eukaryota
- Kingdom: Animalia
- Phylum: Arthropoda
- Class: Insecta
- Order: Lepidoptera
- Family: Depressariidae
- Genus: Ethmia
- Species: E. marmorea

Binomial name
- Ethmia marmorea (Walsingham, 1888)

Synonyms
- Psecadia marmorea Walsingham, 1888

Species of moth

Ethmia marmorea is a moth in the family Depressariidae. It is found in North America in the lower parts of the Great Basin mountain ranges and the Rocky Mountains from south-eastern British Columbia and the eastern parts of the Pacific states to northern and central Colorado and central Chihuahua.

== Description ==
The length of the forewings is 8.4–11.7 mm (0.33–0.46 in). The pattern of the forewings is divided by a longitudinal line along the Cu fold extended below this fold as blunt, triangular spurs at the basal one-fourth, the middle and in the terminal area. The dorsal area is white and the area costad of the line is dark brown, usually with one or more ill-defined whitish blotches along the costa. The ground color of the hindwings is whitish basally, becoming pale brownish on the apical half. Adults are on wing from May to August. There is probably one generation per year.
