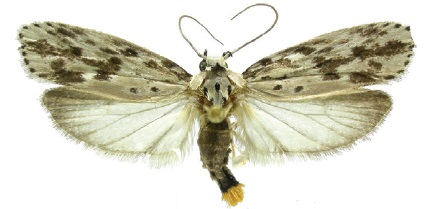

Scientific classification
- Kingdom: Animalia
- Phylum: Arthropoda
- Clade: Pancrustacea
- Class: Insecta
- Order: Lepidoptera
- Family: Depressariidae
- Genus: Ethmia
- Species: E. lichyi

Binomial name
- Ethmia lichyi Powell, 1973

= Ethmia lichyi =

Species of moth

Ethmia lichyi is a moth in the family Depressariidae. It is found in Central and South America, including Venezuela, Brazil, Panama, Costa Rica, Honduras and Guatemala.

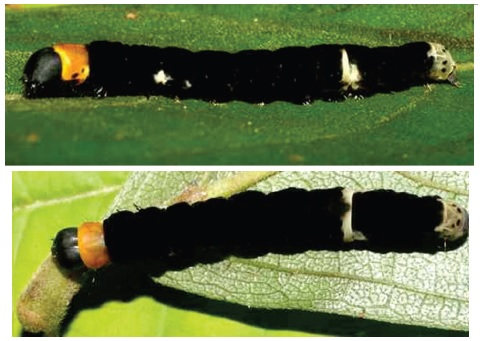
Larva

The length of the forewings is 13.7–17.1 mm (0.54–0.67 in). The ground color of the forewings is white, clouded with very pale gray except narrowly adjoining the blackish brown markings. The ground color of the hindwings is semitranslucent white, becoming brownish at the apex.

The larvae feed on Cordia bicolor, Cordia collococca, Cordia eriostigma, Cordia panamensis and Cordia porcata.
