= Ethmia clarkei =

Scientific classification
- Kingdom: Animalia
- Phylum: Arthropoda
- Clade: Pancrustacea
- Class: Insecta
- Order: Lepidoptera
- Family: Depressariidae
- Genus: Ethmia
- Species: E. clarkei

Binomial name
- Ethmia clarkei Powell, 1973

Species of moth

Ethmia clarkei is a moth in the family Depressariidae. It is found in Mexico, where it was described from the Isla de Mujeres off the coast of Quintana Roo.

The length of the forewings is 8–8.1 mm (0.31–0.32 in). The ground color of the forewings is shining white. The costa is dark brown at the base, while the remainder of the wing is checkered with isolated, metallic blue spots of varying sizes and shapes, more concentrated near the base and in the dorsal area. The ground color of the hindwings is white, tinged with ochreous in the costal area. The apical area is irregularly brownish.
