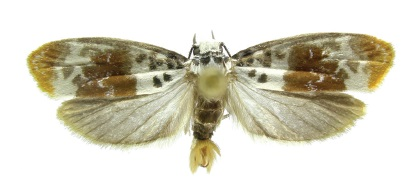

Scientific classification
- Domain: Eukaryota
- Kingdom: Animalia
- Phylum: Arthropoda
- Class: Insecta
- Order: Lepidoptera
- Family: Depressariidae
- Genus: Ethmia
- Species: E. adrianforsythi

Binomial name
- Ethmia adrianforsythi Phillips, 2014

= Ethmia adrianforsythi =

Species of moth

Ethmia adrianforsythi is a moth in the family Depressariidae. It is found in Costa Rica, where it has been recorded from middle elevations on the Caribbean slope of the Cordillera Volcánica de Guanacaste and in the lowlands of Sarapiquí. The habitat consists of rain forests.

The length of the forewings is 10.3–11.2 mm (0.41–0.44 in) for males and 11.5–12.5 mm (0.45–0.49 in) for females. The ground color of the forewings is white with several dark spots in the costal half and two dark spots of similar size in the posterior half. There is a light brown band from the base of the costa. The base of the costa is dark, split by a white spot and there is a large reddish spot surrounded by brown from the costal band to the dorsal area, covering all the area antemedial to the postmedial. The terminal area is reddish, blending to golden at the apex and there is one large spot beyond the cell. The hindwing ground colour is brownish with a pale ochreous termen.

== Etymology ==
The species is named in honor of Adrian Forsyth for his support of tropical biodiversity conservation from Monteverde to the Osa Peninsula to Área de Conservación Guanacaste.
