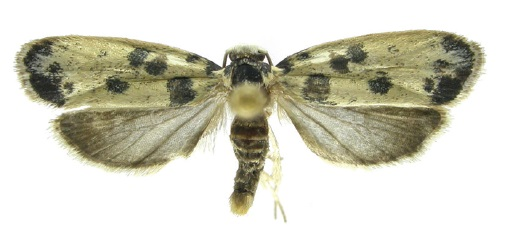

Scientific classification
- Domain: Eukaryota
- Kingdom: Animalia
- Phylum: Arthropoda
- Class: Insecta
- Order: Lepidoptera
- Family: Depressariidae
- Genus: Ethmia
- Species: E. hammella

Binomial name
- Ethmia hammella Busck, 1910

= Ethmia hammella =

Species of moth

Ethmia hammella is a moth in the family Depressariidae. It is found in Costa Rica, Panama and on Gorgona Island in Colombia.

The length of the forewings is 8–11.7 mm (0.31–0.46 in). The ground color of the forewings is pale yellowish white, indistinctly speckled and distinctly blotched with deep steel blue. The ground color of the hindwings is pale brown, but darker apically. The costal area is white. Adults are on wing in March, May, June, August, October and November.
