= Ethmia submersa =

Scientific classification
- Domain: Eukaryota
- Kingdom: Animalia
- Phylum: Arthropoda
- Class: Insecta
- Order: Lepidoptera
- Family: Depressariidae
- Genus: Ethmia
- Species: E. submersa

Binomial name
- Ethmia submersa Diakonoff, 1966

Species of moth

Ethmia submersa is a moth in the family Depressariidae. It was described by Alexey Diakonoff in 1966. It is found on Sulawesi.

The wingspan is about 27 mm (1.1 in).
