= Ethmia proximella =

Scientific classification
- Domain: Eukaryota
- Kingdom: Animalia
- Phylum: Arthropoda
- Class: Insecta
- Order: Lepidoptera
- Family: Depressariidae
- Genus: Ethmia
- Species: E. proximella

Binomial name
- Ethmia proximella Busck, 1912

Species of moth

Ethmia proximella is a moth in the family Depressariidae. It is found in Mexico.

The length of the forewings is 8–9.2 mm (0.31–0.36 in). The ground color of the forewings is white, but the costa from the base nearly to the apex is broadly dark gray-brown. The ground color of the hindwings is white, but pale ochreous-brownish toward the margins. Adults are on wing from June to September.
