= Ethmia linosella =

Scientific classification
- Kingdom: Animalia
- Phylum: Arthropoda
- Class: Insecta
- Order: Lepidoptera
- Family: Depressariidae
- Genus: Ethmia
- Species: E. linosella

Binomial name
- Ethmia linosella Viette, 1976

Species of moth

Ethmia linosella is a moth in the family Depressariidae. It is found in Madagascar.
