= Ethmia mulleri =

Scientific classification
- Domain: Eukaryota
- Kingdom: Animalia
- Phylum: Arthropoda
- Class: Insecta
- Order: Lepidoptera
- Family: Depressariidae
- Genus: Ethmia
- Species: E. mulleri

Binomial name
- Ethmia mulleri Busck, 1910

Species of moth

Ethmia mulleri is a moth in the family Depressariidae. It is found in Mexico.

The length of the forewings is 9.7–10.4 mm (0.38–0.41 in). The ground color of the forewings is white, although the costal area above the cell is gray-brown, ending before the apex. The ground color of the hindwings is pale brownish, but darker under the costal brush. Adults are on wing in May, July, August and September.
