= Ethmia ustyurtensis =

Scientific classification
- Kingdom: Animalia
- Phylum: Arthropoda
- Clade: Pancrustacea
- Class: Insecta
- Order: Lepidoptera
- Family: Depressariidae
- Genus: Ethmia
- Species: E. ustyurtensis

Binomial name
- Ethmia ustyurtensis Nupponen, 2015

Species of moth

Ethmia ustyurtensis is a moth in the family Depressariidae. It is found in south-western Kazakhstan. The habitat consists of calcareous deserts with sparse vegetation.

The wingspan is 10–11 mm (0.39–0.43 in).

== Etymology ==
The species name refers to its geographical origin.
