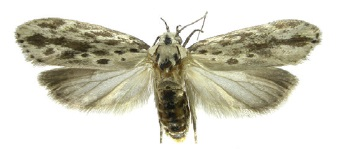

Scientific classification
- Domain: Eukaryota
- Kingdom: Animalia
- Phylum: Arthropoda
- Class: Insecta
- Order: Lepidoptera
- Family: Depressariidae
- Genus: Ethmia
- Species: E. normgershenzi

Binomial name
- Ethmia normgershenzi Phillips, 2014

= Ethmia normgershenzi =

Species of moth

Ethmia normgershenzi is a moth in the family Depressariidae. It is found in Costa Rica, where it has been recorded from the east side of the Cordillera Volcánica de Guanacaste from 400 to 660 meters (1,310 to 2,170 ft). The habitat consists of rain forests.

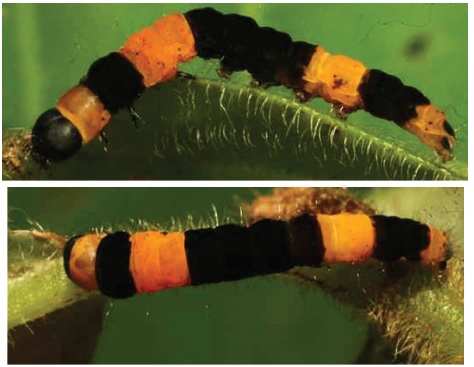
Larva

The length of the forewings is 10.6–10.9 mm (0.42–0.43 in) for males and 10.9–11 mm (0.43–0.43 in) for females. The ground color of the forewings is whitish with blackish markings and two distinct spots at the base, as well as an oblique irregular dark blotch before the middle and directed to but unattached to an elongated mark line from the middle to the termen. The hindwing ground colour is whitish, but darker at the margins.

The larvae feed on Drymonia alloplectoides, Drymonia macrophylla and Drymonia serrulata.

== Etymology ==
The species is named in honor of Norm Gershenz.
