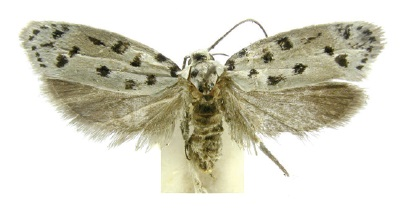

Scientific classification
- Domain: Eukaryota
- Kingdom: Animalia
- Phylum: Arthropoda
- Class: Insecta
- Order: Lepidoptera
- Family: Depressariidae
- Genus: Ethmia
- Species: E. linda

Binomial name
- Ethmia linda Busck, 1914

= Ethmia linda =

Species of moth

Ethmia linda is a moth in the family Depressariidae. It is found from Venezuela to southern Mexico (eastern Oaxaca, Veracruz and Yucatán).

The length of the forewings is 7–7.3 mm (0.28–0.29 in). The ground color of the forewings is white, faintly tinged with grayish on the costal half. The ground color of the hindwings is brown, usually dark at least distally. Adults are on wing in March (in Yucatán), in July (in Veracruz and Oaxaca), in August and October (in Guatemala) and in November (in Venezuela).
