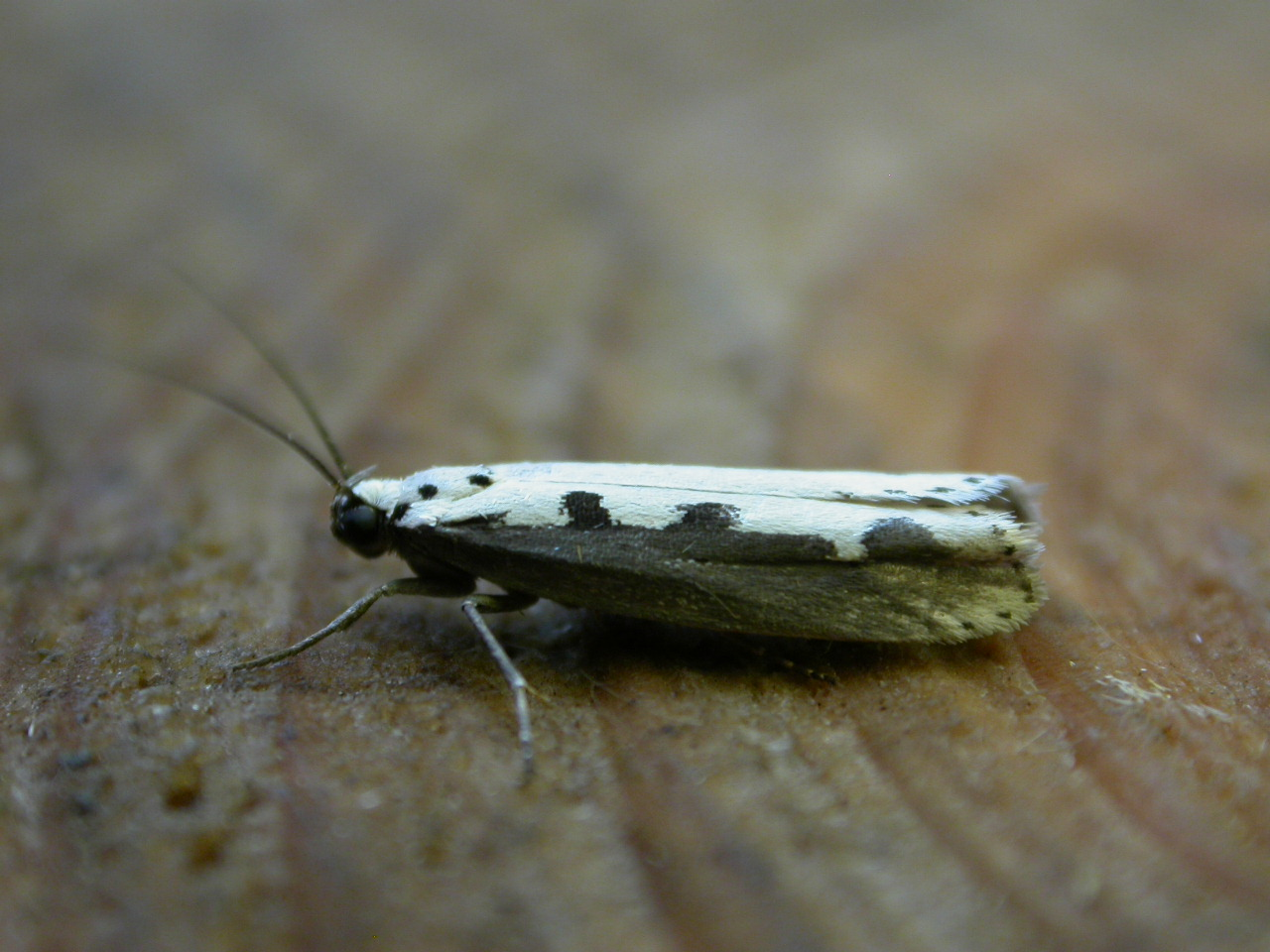
- Adult E. bipunctella at Hellerup (Denmark)

Scientific classification
- Kingdom: Animalia
- Phylum: Arthropoda
- Clade: Pancrustacea
- Class: Insecta
- Order: Lepidoptera
- Family: Depressariidae
- Subfamily: Ethmiinae
- Genus: Ethmia; Hübner, [1819]

Type species
- Phalaena pyrausta Pallas, 1771

Species
- Numerous, see text

Synonyms
- Aedia Duponchel, 1836 (non Hübner, [1823]: preoccupied); Anesychia Hübner, [1825] Azinis Walker, 1863; Babaiaxa Busck, 1902; Ceratophysetis Meyrick, 1887; Chalybe Duponchel, 1836; Dasyethmia Danilevsky, 1969; Disthymia (lapsus); Disthymnia Hübner, [1825] Ehtima (lapsus); Melanoleuca Stephens, 1829; Psecadia Hübner, [1825] Tamarrha Walker, 1864; Theoxenia Walsingham, 1887; Wiltshireia Amsel, 1949 (non Buckman, 1904: preoccupied)

= Ethmia =

Genus of moths

Ethmia is a large genus of small moths. It is the type genus of the gelechioid family Ethmiidae, which is sometimes included in Elachistidae or Oecophoridae as subfamily.

== Selected species ==
Species of Ethmia include:

=== Albitogata species-group ===
- Ethmia albitogata (Walsingham, 1907)
- Ethmia brevistriga (Clarke, 1950)
- Ethmia coquillettella (Busck, 1967)
- Ethmia lassenella (Busck, 1908)
- Ethmia minuta (Powell, 1973)
- Ethmia monachella (Busck, 1910)
- Ethmia plagiobothrae (Powell, 1973)
- Ethmia scylla (Powell, 1973)
- Ethmia tricula (Powell, 1973)
- Ethmia umbrimarginella (Busck, 1907)

=== Amasina species-group ===
- Ethmia amasina (Staudinger, 1879)

=== Assamensis species-group ===
- Ethmia anatiformis (Kun, 2001)
- Ethmia assamensis (Butler, 1879)
- Ethmia autoschista (Meyrick, 1932)
- Ethmia hunanensis (Liu, 1980)
- Ethmia maculata (Sattler, 1967)

=== Aurifluella species-group ===
- Ethmia aurifluella (Hübner, [1810])
- Ethmia lugubris (Staudinger, 1879)
- Ethmia maracandica (Rebel, 1901)
- Ethmia quadripunctella (Eversmann, 1844)
- Ethmia vidua (Staudinger, 1879)

=== Baliostola species-group ===
- Ethmia baliostola (Walsingham, 1912)
- Ethmia cubensis (Busck, 1934)

=== Bipunctella species-group ===
- Ethmia bipunctella
- Ethmia caliginosella (Busck, 1904)
- Ethmia cirrhocnemia (Lederer, 1870)
- Ethmia euphoria (Kun, 2007)
- Ethmia iranella (Zerny, 1940)
- Ethmia monticola (Walsingham, 1880)
- Ethmia namangana (Rebel, 1901)
- Ethmia pagiopa (Meyrick, 1918)
- Ethmia treitschkeella (Staudinger, 1879)

=== Charybdis species-group ===
- Ethmia charybdis (Powell, 1973)

=== Chrysopyga species-group ===
- Ethmia caradjae (Rebel, 1907)
- Ethmia chrysopyga

=== Confusella species-group ===
- Ethmia berndkerni (Phillips, 2014)
- Ethmia billalleni (Phillips, 2014)
- Ethmia confusella (Walker, 1863)
- Ethmia confusellastra (Powell, 1973)
- Ethmia dimauraorum (Phillips, 2014)
- Ethmia duckworthi (Powell, 1973)
- Ethmia ehakernae (Phillips, 2014)
- Ethmia farrella (Powell, 1973)
- Ethmia helenmillerae (Phillips, 2014)
- Ethmia humilis (Powell, 1973)
- Ethmia johnpringlei (Phillips, 2014)
- Ethmia julia (Powell, 1973)
- Ethmia sandra (Powell, 1973)
- Ethmia striatella (Busck, 1913)

=== Conglobata species-group ===
- Ethmia conglobata (Meyrick, 1912)

=== Crocosoma species-group ===
- Ethmia crocosoma (Meyrick, 1914)
- Ethmia epitrocha (Meyrick, 1914)
- Ethmia maculifera (Matsumura, 1931)
- Ethmia szabokyi (Kun, 2001)
- Ethmia vietmiella (Kun, 2001)
- Ethmia yeni (Kun, 2001)

=== Cyanea species-group ===
- Ethmia cyanea (Walsingham, 1912)

=== Cypraeella species-group ===
- Ethmia abraxasella (Walker, 1864)
- Ethmia blaineorum (Phillips, 2014)
- Ethmia cellicoma (Meyrick, 1931)
- Ethmia chalcodora (Meyrick, 1912)
- Ethmia chalcogramma (Powell, 1973)
- Ethmia cupreonivella (Walsingham, 1880)
- Ethmia cypraeella (Zeller, 1863)
- Ethmia cypraspis (Meyrick, 1930)
- Ethmia elutella (Busck, 1914)
- Ethmia epilygella (Powell, 1973)
- Ethmia festiva (Busck, 1914)
- Ethmia fritillella (Powell, 1973)
- Ethmia iridella (Powell, 1973)
- Ethmia janzeni (Powell, 1973)
- Ethmia millerorum (Phillips, 2014)
- Ethmia nivosella (Walker, 1864)
- Ethmia notomurinella (Powell, 1973)
- Ethmia perpulchra (Walsingham, 1912)
- Ethmia phylacops (Powell, 1973)
- Ethmia proximella (Busck, 1912)
- Ethmia scythropa (Walsingham, 1912)
- Ethmia submissa (Busck, 1914)
- Ethmia terpnota (Walsingham, 1912)
- Ethmia ungulatella (Busck, 1914)

=== Dehiscens species-group ===
- Ethmia dehiscens (Meyrick, 1924)

=== Distigmatella species-group ===
- Ethmia alba (Amsel, 1949)
- Ethmia distigmatella (Erschoff, 1874)
- Ethmia falkovitshi (Shovkoon, 2010)
- Ethmia quadrinotella (Mann, 1861)
- Ethmia tamaridella (Rebel, 1907)
- Ethmia turkmeniella (Dubatolov & Ustjuzhanin, 1998)
- Ethmia ustyurtensis (Nupponen, 2015)

=== Ditreta species-group ===
- Ethmia arabica (Amsel, 1961) (mostly included in ditreta)
- Ethmia ditreta (Meyrick, 1920)

=== Dodecea species-group ===
- Ethmia albifrontella (Sattler, 1967)
- Ethmia angarensis (Caradja, 1939)
- Ethmia candidella (Alphéraky, 1908)
- Ethmia dodecea
- Ethmia ermineella (Walsingham, 1880)
- Ethmia fumidella (Wocke, 1850)
- Ethmia japonica (Sattler, 1967)
- Ethmia pusiella (Linnaeus, 1758)
- Ethmia quadrillella (Goeze, 1783)
- Ethmia septempunctata (Christoph, 1882)
- Ethmia zygospila (Meyrick, 1934)

=== Exornata species-group ===
- Ethmia adrianforsythi (Phillips, 2014)
- Ethmia dianemillerae (Phillips, 2014)
- Ethmia exornata (Zeller, 1877)
- Ethmia gelidella (Walker, 1864)
- Ethmia mnesicosma (Meyrick, 1924)
- Ethmia phylacis (Walsingham, 1912)

=== Gigantea species-group ===
- Ethmia gigantea (Busck, 1914)

=== Haemorrhoidella species-group ===
- Ethmia haemorrhoidella (Eversmann, 1844)
- Ethmia subsidiaris (Meyrick, 1935)

=== Hagenella species-group ===
- Ethmia burnsella (Powell, 1973)
- Ethmia hagenella (Chambers, 1878)
- Ethmia mimihagenella (Powell, 1973)
- Ethmia zelleriella (Chambers, 1878)

=== Hammella species-group ===
- Ethmia hammella (Busck, 1910)

=== Joviella species-group ===
- Ethmia joviella (Walsingham, 1897)
- Ethmia linda (Busck, 1914)

=== Kirbyi species-group ===
- Ethmia bittenella (Busck, 1910)
- Ethmia clarkei (Powell, 1973)
- Ethmia davisella (Powell, 1973)
- Ethmia delliella (Fernald, 1891)
- Ethmia kirbyi (Moeschler, 1890)
- Ethmia linsdalei (Powell, 1973)
- Ethmia subsimilis (Walsingham, 1897)

=== Lapidella species-group ===
- Ethmia bisignata (Kun, 2002)
- Ethmia didyma (Kun, 2002)
- Ethmia heptasema (Turner, 1898)
- Ethmia lapidella (Walsingham, 1880)
- Ethmia nobilis (Diakonoff, [1968])
- Ethmia octanoma (Meyrick, 1914)
- Ethmia reposita (Diakonoff, [1968])
- Ethmia stojanovitsi (Kun, 2002)

=== Lineatonotella species-group ===
- Ethmia galactarcha (Meyrick, 1928)
- Ethmia lineatonotella (Moore, 1867)
- Ethmia palawana (Schultze, 1925)
- Ethmia thomaswitti (Kun, 2004)
- Ethmia trifida (Kun, 2004)

=== Longimaculella species-group ===
- Ethmia calumniella (Powell, 1973)
- Ethmia catapeltica (Meyrick, 1924)
- Ethmia coronata (Walsingham, 1912)
- Ethmia flavicaudata (Walsingham, 1912)
- Ethmia hendersonorum (Phillips, 2014)
- Ethmia hieroglyphica (Powell, 1973)
- Ethmia howdeni (Powell, 1973)
- Ethmia laphamorum (Phillips, 2014)
- Ethmia lesliesaulae (Phillips, 2014)
- Ethmia lichyi (Powell, 1973)
- Ethmia longimaculella (Chambers, 1872)
- Ethmia nicholsonorum (Phillips, 2014)
- Ethmia nigritaenia (Powell, 1973)
- Ethmia normgershenzi (Phillips, 2014)
- Ethmia omega (Powell, 1973)
- Ethmia petersterlingi (Phillips, 2014)
- Ethmia plaumanni (Powell, 1973)
- Ethmia randycurtisi (Phillips, 2014)
- Ethmia randyjonesi (Phillips, 2014)
- Ethmia subnigritaenia (Powell, 1973)
- Ethmia transversella (Busck, 1914)
- Ethmia turnerorum (Phillips, 2014)

=== Lybiella species-group ===
- Ethmia lepidella (Chrétien, 1907)
- Ethmia lybiella (Ragonot, 1892)

=== Macelhosiella species-group ===
- Ethmia geranella (Barnes & Busck, 1920)
- Ethmia macelhosiella (Busck, 1907)
- Ethmia macneilli (Powell, 1973)
- Ethmia timberlakei (Powell, 1973)

=== Mulleri species-group ===
- Ethmia mulleri (Busck, 1910)

=== Nigripedella species-group ===
- Ethmia albolinella (Shovkoon, 2010)
- Ethmia asbolarcha (Meyrick, 1938)
- Ethmia bombina (Sattler, 1967)
- Ethmia chrysopygella (Kolenati, 1846)
- Ethmia comitella (Caradja, 1927)
- Ethmia flavianella (Treitschke, 1832)
- Ethmia mongolica (Rebel, 1901)
- Ethmia nigrimaculata (Sattler, 1967)
- Ethmia nigripedella (Erschoff, 1877)
- Ethmia sibirica (Danilevsky, 1975)
- Ethmia ubsensis (Zagulajev, 1975)
- Ethmia ultima (Sattler, 1967)
- Ethmia umbricostella (Caradja, 1927)

=== Nigroapicella species-group ===
- Ethmia dentata (Diakonoff & Sattler, 1966)
- Ethmia nigroapicella (kou leafworm) (Saalmüller, 1880)

=== Notatella species-group ===
- Ethmia chemsaki (Powell, 1959)
- Ethmia hiramella (Busck, 1914)
- Ethmia notatella (Walker, 1863)
- Ethmia paucella (Walker, 1863)
- Ethmia phoenicura (Meyrick, 1932)
- Ethmia stephenrumseyi (Phillips, 2014)
- Ethmia wellingi (Powell, 1973)
- Ethmia zebrata (Powell, 1959)

=== Papiella species-group ===
- Ethmia papiella (Powell, 1973)
- Ethmia volcanella (Powell, 1973)

=== Piperella species-group ===
- Ethmia piperella (Powell, 1973)

=== Prattiella species-group ===
- Ethmia prattiella (Busck, 1915)

=== Punctessa species-group ===
- Ethmia angustalatella (Powell, 1973)
- Ethmia punctessa (Powell, 1973)

=== Pyrausta species-group ===
- Ethmia discrepitella (Rebel, 1901)
- Ethmia nykta (Shovkoon, 2010)
- Ethmia pyrausta (Pallas, 1771)

=== Rothschildi species-group ===
- Ethmia pseudoscythrella (Rebel, 1902)
- Ethmia rothschildi (Rebel, 1912)

=== Semilugens species-group ===
- Ethmia albistrigella (Walsingham, 1880)
- Ethmia apicipunctella (Chambers, 1875)
- Ethmia arctostaphylella (Walsingham, 1880)
- Ethmia discostrigella (Chambers, 1877)
- Ethmia epileuca (Powell, 1959)
- Ethmia mansita (Busck, 1914)
- Ethmia nadia (Clarke, 1950)
- Ethmia orestella (Powell, 1973)
- Ethmia semilugens (Zeller, 1872)
- Ethmia semitenebrella (Dyar, 1902)

=== Suspecta species-group ===
- Ethmia afghana (Sattler, 1967)
- Ethmia interposita (Sattler, 1967)
- Ethmia similis (Sattler, 1967)
- Ethmia suspecta (Sattler, 1967)

=== Terminella species-group ===
- Ethmia terminella (T.B. Fletcher, 1938)

=== Trifurcella species-group ===
- Ethmia albicostella (Beutenmüller, 1889)
- Ethmia baja (Powell, 1973)
- Ethmia clava (Powell, 1973)
- Ethmia cordia (Powell, 1973)
- Ethmia heptastica (Walsingham, 1912) (misspelled as Ethmia heptasticta)
- Ethmia hodgesella (Powell, 1973)
- Ethmia marmorea (Walsingham, 1888)
- Ethmia miriamschulmanae (Phillips, 2014)
- Ethmia mirusella (Chambers, 1874)
- Ethmia oterosella (Busck, 1934) (misspelled as Ethmia oterostella)
- Ethmia pala (Powell, 1973)
- Ethmia penthica (Walsingham, 1912)
- Ethmia playa (Powell, 1973)
- Ethmia scutula (Powell, 1973)
- Ethmia semiombra (Dyar, 1902)
- Ethmia similatella (Busck, 1920)
- Ethmia sphenisca (Powell, 1973)
- Ethmia tilneyorum (Phillips, 2014)
- Ethmia trifurcella (Chambers, 1873)

=== Tripunctella species-group ===
- Ethmia tripunctella (Staudinger, 1879)

=== Vittalbella species-group ===
- Ethmia lecmima (Sattler, 1967)
- Ethmia vittalbella (Christoph, 1877)

=== Wursteri species-group ===
- Ethmia derbendella (Sattler, 1967)
- Ethmia infelix (Wagner, 1914)
- Ethmia wursteri (Amsel, 1956)

=== Unassigned ===
- Ethmia acontias (Meyrick, 1906)
- Ethmia albilineata (Viette, 1952)
- Ethmia ampanella (Viette, 1976)
- Ethmia andranella (Viette, 1976)
- Ethmia antennipilosa (Wang and Li, 2004)
- Ethmia anthracopis (Meyrick, 1902)
- Ethmia antranella (Viette, 1976)
- Ethmia apispinata (Wang & Wang, 2012)
- Ethmia argomicta (Meyrick, 1920)
- Ethmia argopa (Meyrick, 1910)
- Ethmia atriflorella (Viette, 1958)
- Ethmia austronamibiensis (Mey, 2011)
- Ethmia baihua (Yang, 1977)
- Ethmia ballistis (Meyrick, 1908)
- Ethmia baronella (Viette, 1976)
- Ethmia befasiella (Viette, 1958)
- Ethmia bicolorella (Guenée, 1879)
- Ethmia bradleyi (Viette, 1952)
- Ethmia cassiopeia (Meyrick, 1927)
- Ethmia circumdatella (Walker, 1863)
- Ethmia cirrhosoma (Meyrick, 1920)
- Ethmia clytodoxa (Turner, 1917)
- Ethmia comoriensis (Viette, 1963)
- Ethmia coscineutis (Meyrick, 1912)
- Ethmia cribravia (Wang and Li, 2004)
- Ethmia cyrenaicella (Amsel, 1955)
- Ethmia dactylia (Meyrick, 1912)
- Ethmia damaoshanae (Wang & Zheng, 1997)
- Ethmia decaryanum (Viette, 1954)
- Ethmia deconfiturella (Viette, 1963)
- Ethmia decui (Capuse, 1981)
- Ethmia defreinai (Ganev, 1984)
- Ethmia duplicata (Meyrick 1914)
- Ethmia elimatella (Danilevsky, 1975)
- Ethmia epiloxa (Meyrick, 1914)
- Ethmia epitrocha (Meyrick, 1914)
- Ethmia eupostica (Powell, 1985)
- Ethmia glabra (Meyrick, 1920)
- Ethmia glandifera (Meyrick, 1918)
- Ethmia gonimodes (Meyrick, 1925)
- Ethmia guangzhouensis (Liu, 1980)
- Ethmia hainanensis (Liu, 1980)
- Ethmia hakkarica (Koçak, 1986)
- Ethmia hamaxastra (Meyrick, 1930)
- Ethmia heliomela (Lower, 1923)
- Ethmia hemadelpha (Lower, 1903)
- Ethmia hemicosma (Meyrick, 1920)
- Ethmia hiemalis (Danilevski, 1969)
- Ethmia hilarella (Walker, 1863)
- Ethmia humiliella (Chrétien, 1916)
- Ethmia incertella (Capuse, 1981)
- Ethmia iphicrates (Meyrick, 1922)
- Ethmia jingdongensis (Wang & Zheng, 1997)
- Ethmia judicialis (Meyrick, 1921)
- Ethmia kabulica (Amsel, 1969)
- Ethmia kutisi (Heppner, 1991)
- Ethmia leucocirrha (Meyrick, 1926)
- Ethmia linosella (Viette, 1976)
- Ethmia livida (Zeller, 1852)
- Ethmia mariannae (Karsholt & Kun, 2003)
- Ethmia melanocrates (Meyrick, 1923)
- Ethmia menyuanensis (Liu, 1980)
- Ethmia mixtella (Chrétien, 1915)
- Ethmia namella (Mey, 2011)
- Ethmia novoryella (Viette, 1976)
- Ethmia oberthurella (Viette, 1958)
- Ethmia oculigera (Möschler, 1883)
- Ethmia oculimarginata (Diakonoff, 1947)
- Ethmia ogovensis (Strand, 1913)
- Ethmia okinawana (Matsumura, 1931)
- Ethmia parabittenella (Capuse, 1981)
- Ethmia penesella (Kun & Szaboky, 2000)
- Ethmia penyagolosella (Domingo & Baixeras, 2003)
- Ethmia pericentrota (Meyrick, 1926)
- Ethmia persica (Kun, 2007)
- Ethmia phricotypa (Bradley, 1965)
- Ethmia pingxiangensis Liu, 1980)
- Ethmia postica (Zeller, 1877)
- Ethmia powelli (Heppner, 1988)
- Ethmia praeclara (Meyrick, 1910)
- Ethmia pseudozygospila (Kun & Szaboky, 2000)
- Ethmia pseustis (Turner, 1942)
- Ethmia pullata (Meyrick, 1910)
- Ethmia pylonotella (Viette, 1956)
- Ethmia pylorella (Viette, 1956)
- Ethmia rhomboidella (Walsingham, 1897)
- Ethmia saalmullerella (Viette, 1958)
- Ethmia sabiella (Felder & Rogenhofer, 1875)
- Ethmia sattleri (Kun, 2007)
- Ethmia shensicola (Amsel, 1969)
- Ethmia sibonensis (Capuse, 1981)
- Ethmia soljanikovi (Danilevsky & Zaguljaev, 1975)
- Ethmia sotsaella (Viette, 1976)
- Ethmia sphaerosticha (Meyrick, 1887)
- Ethmia sporadica (Turner, 1942)
- Ethmia spyrathodes (Meyrick, 1922)
- Ethmia submersa (Diakonoff, 1966)
- Ethmia susa (Kun & Szaboky, 2000)
- Ethmia taxiacta (Meyrick, 1920)
- Ethmia termenalbata (Capuse, 1981)
- Ethmia thoraea (Meyrick, 1910)
- Ethmia tyranthes (Meyrick, 1934)
- Ethmia unilongistriella (Capuse, 1981)
- Ethmia virilisca (Powell, 1985)
- Ethmia vulcanica (Kun, 2004)
- Ethmia yunnanensis Liu, 1980)
- Ethmia zaguljaevi (Kostjuk, 1980)

== Former species ==
- Ethmia andalusica (Staudinger, 1879)
