= Ethmia umbricostella =

Scientific classification
- Kingdom: Animalia
- Phylum: Arthropoda
- Clade: Pancrustacea
- Class: Insecta
- Order: Lepidoptera
- Family: Depressariidae
- Genus: Ethmia
- Species: E. umbricostella

Binomial name
- Ethmia umbricostella Caradja, 1927

Species of moth

Ethmia umbricostella is a moth in the family Depressariidae. It was described by Aristide Caradja in 1927. It is found in China (Sichuan, northern Yunnan).
