= Ethmia notomurinella =

Scientific classification
- Kingdom: Animalia
- Phylum: Arthropoda
- Clade: Pancrustacea
- Class: Insecta
- Order: Lepidoptera
- Family: Depressariidae
- Genus: Ethmia
- Species: E. notomurinella

Binomial name
- Ethmia notomurinella Powell, 1973

Species of moth

Ethmia notomurinella is a moth in the family Depressariidae. It is found in Argentina.
