= Ethmia kutisi =

Scientific classification
- Kingdom: Animalia
- Phylum: Arthropoda
- Clade: Pancrustacea
- Class: Insecta
- Order: Lepidoptera
- Family: Depressariidae
- Genus: Ethmia
- Species: E. kutisi

Binomial name
- Ethmia kutisi Heppner, 1991

Species of moth

Ethmia kutisi is a moth in the family Depressariidae. It is found in Florida, United States.

Adults are on wing nearly year round.
