= Ethmia antennipilosa =

Scientific classification
- Domain: Eukaryota
- Kingdom: Animalia
- Phylum: Arthropoda
- Class: Insecta
- Order: Lepidoptera
- Family: Depressariidae
- Genus: Ethmia
- Species: E. antennipilosa

Binomial name
- Ethmia antennipilosa Wang and Li, 2004

Species of moth

Ethmia antennipilosa is a moth in the family Depressariidae. It is found in China (Guangxi).

The length of the forewings is about 10.5 mm (0.41 in).

== Etymology ==
The species name refers to the specialized scales forming a hairbrush on the dorsal edge of the antenna and is derived from Latin antenna (meaning long projection) and pilosa (meaning hairy or pilose).
