= Ethmia striatella =

Scientific classification
- Domain: Eukaryota
- Kingdom: Animalia
- Phylum: Arthropoda
- Class: Insecta
- Order: Lepidoptera
- Family: Depressariidae
- Genus: Ethmia
- Species: E. striatella

Binomial name
- Ethmia striatella Busck, 1913

Species of moth

Ethmia striatella is a moth in the family Depressariidae. It is found in the thorn forest areas of central Mexico.

The length of the forewings is 9.7–11 mm (0.38–0.43 in). The ground color of the forewings is whitish gray, more or less uniformly streaked with dark gray. The ground color of the hindwings is semi translucent white near the base and narrowly or rather broadly dark brownish in the apical area. Adults are on wing in June and September (Puebla) and in late July (Sinaloa).
