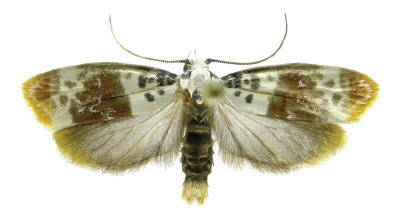

Scientific classification
- Kingdom: Animalia
- Phylum: Arthropoda
- Clade: Pancrustacea
- Class: Insecta
- Order: Lepidoptera
- Family: Depressariidae
- Genus: Ethmia
- Species: E. exornata

Binomial name
- Ethmia exornata (Zeller, 1877)

Synonyms
- Psecadia exornata Zeller, 1877; Ethmia exornatella

= Ethmia exornata =

Species of moth

Ethmia exornata is a moth in the family Depressariidae. It is widespread in northern South America and Central America, ranging from Brazil (Rio de Janeiro) through Central America to the west coast of Mexico.

The length of the forewings is 9.7–12.4 mm (0.38–0.49 in). The ground color of the forewings is white with several dark brown spots near the base on the costal half. These are strongly reflecting blue-green and at times partially fusing. The ground color of the hindwings is whitish, becoming brownish toward the distal margins or entirely brownish. The apical area is ocherous. Adults are on wing in January (in Peru), in February (in Trinidad), in May and December (in Brazil), in June and November (in Venezuela), from June to July (in Guatemala), in August (in Ecuador and Mexico) and in September (in Nicaragua).
