= Ethmia phylacops =

Scientific classification
- Kingdom: Animalia
- Phylum: Arthropoda
- Clade: Pancrustacea
- Class: Insecta
- Order: Lepidoptera
- Family: Depressariidae
- Genus: Ethmia
- Species: E. phylacops

Binomial name
- Ethmia phylacops Powell, 1973

Species of moth

Ethmia phylacops is a moth in the family Depressariidae. It is found in Mexico.

The length of the forewings is 8.3–9.9 mm (0.33–0.39 in). The ground color of the forewings is white, the costal half from the base to the end of the cell heavily clouded with pale grayish brown, followed by two separated spots of the same color in the terminal area. The ground color of the hindwings is white, becoming pale ocherous at the apical margin.
