= Ethmia cypraspis =

Scientific classification
- Kingdom: Animalia
- Phylum: Arthropoda
- Class: Insecta
- Order: Lepidoptera
- Family: Depressariidae
- Genus: Ethmia
- Species: E. cypraspis

Binomial name
- Ethmia cypraspis Meyrick, 1930

Species of moth

Ethmia cypraspis is a moth in the family Depressariidae. It is found in the Amazon region of Brazil.

The length of the forewings is 9.4–9.8 mm (0.37–0.39 in). The ground color of the forewings is white, with brownish gray markings. The ground color of the hindwings is white, becoming pale brownish at the distal margins. Adults are on wing from July to September.
