= Ethmia humilis =

Scientific classification
- Kingdom: Animalia
- Phylum: Arthropoda
- Clade: Pancrustacea
- Class: Insecta
- Order: Lepidoptera
- Family: Depressariidae
- Genus: Ethmia
- Species: E. humilis

Binomial name
- Ethmia humilis Powell, 1973

Species of moth

Ethmia humilis is a moth in the family Depressariidae. It is found in Jamaica.

The length of the forewings is about 5.4 mm (0.21 in). The ground colour of the forewings is tan with some scarcely discernible slightly darker spots. The ground colour of the hindwings is whitish, slightly tinged with brownish distally.
