= Ethmia omega =

Scientific classification
- Kingdom: Animalia
- Phylum: Arthropoda
- Clade: Pancrustacea
- Class: Insecta
- Order: Lepidoptera
- Family: Depressariidae
- Genus: Ethmia
- Species: E. omega

Binomial name
- Ethmia omega Powell, 1973

Species of moth

Ethmia omega is a moth in the family Depressariidae. It is found in Brazil.

The length of the forewings is 11.6–12.4 mm (0.46–0.49 in). The ground color of the forewings is whitish, heavily interspersed with brownish gray scales, appearing more or less uniform speckled gray. The markings are blackish brown. The ground color of the hindwings is white, becoming brownish along the costal and the distal margins.
