= Ethmia pagiopa =

Scientific classification
- Kingdom: Animalia
- Phylum: Arthropoda
- Class: Insecta
- Order: Lepidoptera
- Family: Depressariidae
- Genus: Ethmia
- Species: E. pagiopa

Binomial name
- Ethmia pagiopa Meyrick, 1918

Species of moth

Ethmia pagiopa is a moth in the family Depressariidae. It was described by Edward Meyrick in 1918. It is found in Afghanistan and Kashmir.

The wingspan is about 26 mm (1.0 in). The forewings are dark fuscous, with the costal edge whitish except towards the base and with a broad ochreous-white dorsal band occupying two-fifths of the wing throughout. The edge is straight but excavated by small oval blackish spots in the middle and at four-fifths, the second preceded by a small white prominence surmounted by a black dot, and marked with a small round black spot within the margin at one-fourth. There is a row of large irregular black dots along the termen and apical part of the costa. The hindwings are light grey, but whitish ochreous along the dorsum.
