= Ethmia cordia =

Scientific classification
- Kingdom: Animalia
- Phylum: Arthropoda
- Clade: Pancrustacea
- Class: Insecta
- Order: Lepidoptera
- Family: Depressariidae
- Genus: Ethmia
- Species: E. cordia

Binomial name
- Ethmia cordia Powell, 1973

Species of moth

Ethmia cordia is a moth in the family Depressariidae. It is found in eastern Mexico.

The length of the forewings is 7.9–8.3 mm (0.31–0.33 in). The ground color of the forewings is divided by a sinuate (wavy), longitudinal line and is dark brown above and white below to the dorsum. The ground color of the hindwings is whitish basally, becoming pale brownish distally.
