= Ethmia cassiopeia =

Scientific classification
- Kingdom: Animalia
- Phylum: Arthropoda
- Class: Insecta
- Order: Lepidoptera
- Family: Depressariidae
- Genus: Ethmia
- Species: E. cassiopeia

Binomial name
- Ethmia cassiopeia Meyrick, 1927

Species of moth

Ethmia cassiopeia is a moth in the family Depressariidae. It is found in the Democratic Republic of Congo.
