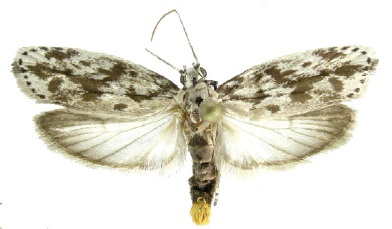

Scientific classification
- Domain: Eukaryota
- Kingdom: Animalia
- Phylum: Arthropoda
- Class: Insecta
- Order: Lepidoptera
- Family: Depressariidae
- Genus: Ethmia
- Species: E. randyjonesi

Binomial name
- Ethmia randyjonesi Phillips, 2014

= Ethmia randyjonesi =

Species of moth

Ethmia randyjonesi is a moth in the family Depressariidae. It is found in Costa Rica, where it has been recorded from the Cordillera Volcánica de Guanacaste, Tilarán and Cordillera Volcánica Central at altitudes ranging from 500 to 1,200 meters (1,600 to 3,900 ft). The habitat consists of rain forests.

The length of the forewings is 15.9–16.4 mm (0.63–0.65 in) for males and 16.4–16.7 mm (0.65–0.66 in) for females. The ground color of the forewings is whitish, with a series of elongated dark markings. The hindwing ground colour is whitish, becoming brownish at the apex.

== Etymology ==
The species is named in honor of Randy Jones for his support of the beginning and growth of Instituto Nacional de Biodiversidad.
