= Ethmia cupreonivella =

Scientific classification
- Domain: Eukaryota
- Kingdom: Animalia
- Phylum: Arthropoda
- Class: Insecta
- Order: Lepidoptera
- Family: Depressariidae
- Genus: Ethmia
- Species: E. cupreonivella

Binomial name
- Ethmia cupreonivella (Walsingham, 1880)

Synonyms
- Psecadia cupreonivella Walsingham, 1880

Species of moth

Ethmia cupreonivella is a moth in the family Depressariidae. It is found in Brazil.

The length of the forewings is about 13.2 mm (0.52 in). The ground color of the forewings is glossy cupreous violet with large shining snow-white spots and blotches. The ground color of the hindwings is pale grayish brown, rather whitish, not quite transparent towards the base.
