= Ethmia iridella =

Scientific classification
- Kingdom: Animalia
- Phylum: Arthropoda
- Clade: Pancrustacea
- Class: Insecta
- Order: Lepidoptera
- Family: Depressariidae
- Genus: Ethmia
- Species: E. iridella

Binomial name
- Ethmia iridella Powell, 1973

Species of moth

Ethmia iridella is a moth in the family Depressariidae. It is found in Mexico.

The length of the forewings is about 12.3 mm (0.48 in). The ground color of the forewings is white. The ground color of the hindwings is white, but faintly grayish along the costa and tinged with pale ocherous at the apex.
