= Ethmia pingxiangensis =

Scientific classification
- Kingdom: Animalia
- Phylum: Arthropoda
- Clade: Pancrustacea
- Class: Insecta
- Order: Lepidoptera
- Family: Depressariidae
- Genus: Ethmia
- Species: E. pingxiangensis

Binomial name
- Ethmia pingxiangensis Y.-Q. Liu, 1980

Species of moth

Ethmia pingxiangensis is a moth in the family Depressariidae. It was described by You-Qiao Liu in 1980. It is found in Guangxi, China.

Adults resemble Ethmia hainanensis and Ethmia acontias.
