= Acontius (disambiguation) =

Acontius is a young man in Greek mythology.

Acontius may also refer to:

- Abundius the Sacristan (died c. 564), also spelled Acontius, a sacristan of the Church of Saint Peter in Rome
- Jacopo Aconcio (c. 1520–c. 1566), also known as Jacobus Acontius, Italian jurist, theologian, philosopher and engineer
- Melchior Acontius (1515–1569), German poet
- Lucius Ranius Optatus, perhaps surnamed Acontius, ancient Roman official, a member of the Rania gens plebeian family
- Acontius (spider), a spider genus
- USS Acontius, a World War II motor torpedo boat tender

== See also ==
- Acontias (disambiguation)
