= Acontias (disambiguation) =

Acontias is a genus of lizards of family Scincidae.

Acontias may also refer to:

- Agkistrodon, synonym Acontias, a genus of venomous pit vipers
- Ethmia acontias, a moth in the family Depressariida

== See also ==
- Acontia, a genus of moths of the family Noctuidae
- Acontius (disambiguation)
