= Venus and Cupid with a Honeycomb =

Painting by Lucas Cranach the Elder

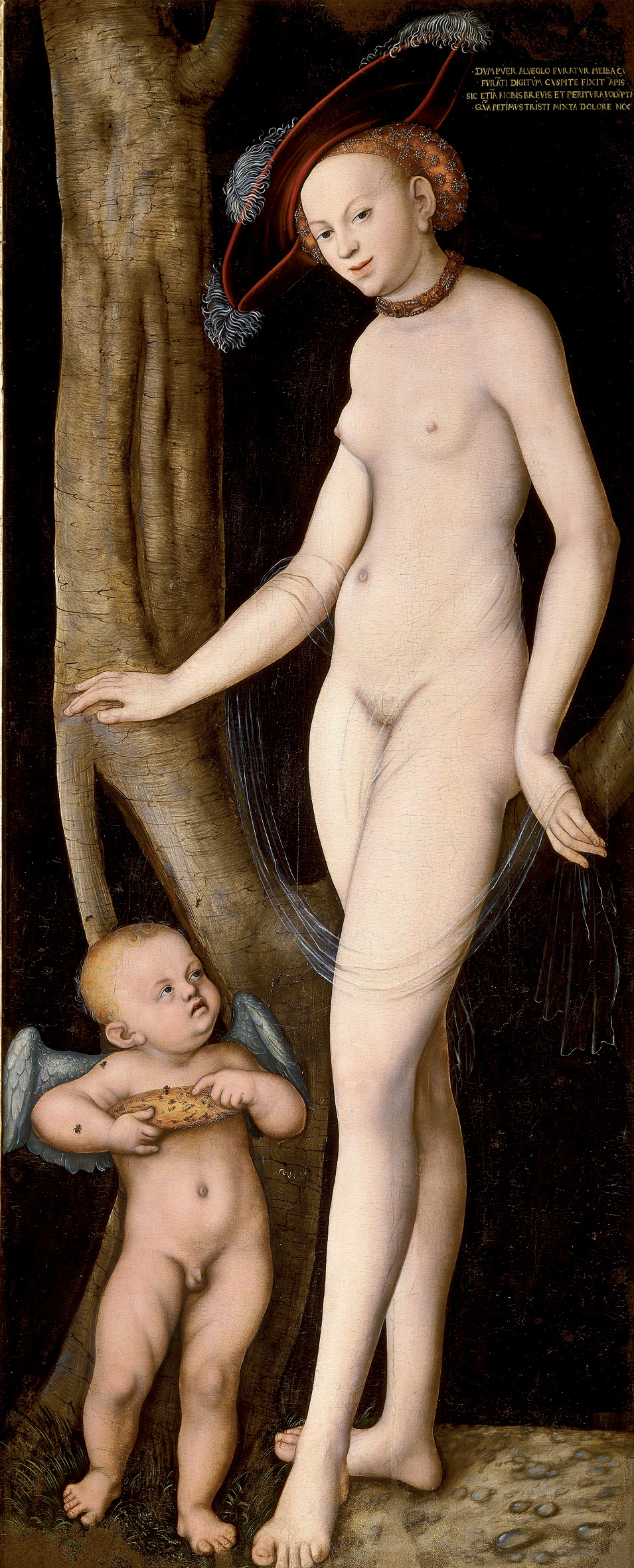
- Artist: Cranach Lucas also known as Cranach The Elder
- Year: c. 1531
- Completion date: 1531
- Medium: Oil on wooden panel
- Subject: Venus, Cupid and the honeycomb
- Dimensions: 169 cm × 67 cm (67 in × 26 in)
- Location: Galleria Borghese, Rome

Venus and Cupid with a Honeycomb is an oil painting by the German artist Lucas Cranach the Elder, one of the masters of the German Renaissance. It was probably executed in 1531 after Cranach met Georg Sabinus, a German poet, diplomat and academic at the University of Wittenberg. It is displayed in the Galleria Borghese, Rome. There are twenty-four paintings on this subject, replicated many times by the painter, including Venus and Cupid with a Honeycomb which belongs to the very first series that began in 1509. Another well known versions is Cupid Complaining to Venus, dated c. 1526–27 and preserved at the National Gallery in London.

== Description and style ==
In this painting, Lucas Cranach the Elder depicts Venus and her son Cupid.

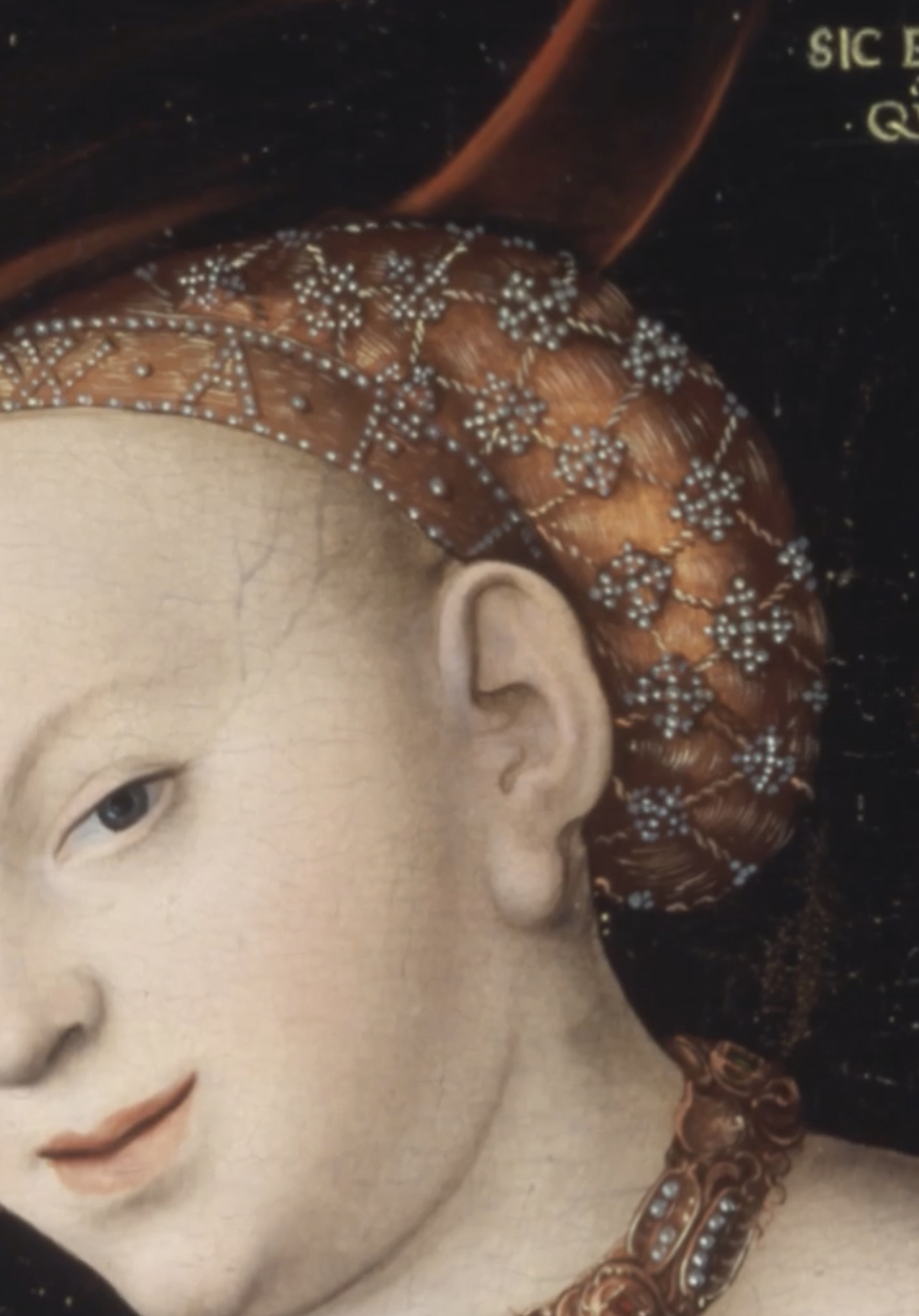
Venus hair ornament

Against the brown background the bare trunk of a tree stands out. The wrinkled bark is in contrast with the ivory complexion of Venus. Her body recalls the classical iconography of the Goddess of Love.

The divinity is a portrait of a Saxon duchess who is completely naked and holds a threadlike drape between her right arm, which rests on the tree on one side, and her right hand on the other. Her drape does not cover her but highlights her sensuality, while her right arm is slightly bent to emphasise the sinuosity of her body.
In contrast to her nudity, she wears an elegant red hat that reflects the Gothic style. It is decorated with elegant crane feathers. Such an accessory used to be particularly in vogue at the court of the Electors of Saxony. At that time, women had to choose between this headdress and a cap sown with large pearls to collect their hair. In this painting, Venus wears both of them, along with a necklace of gems and a ribbon, on which the letters "W.A.F.I." are embroidered. The significance is still not clear. Some researchers contend it might be a reference to the effigy's name.

At her feet, the winged infant Cupid looks up at her mother. With a darker complexion, his body is full of chiaroscuro, which highlights the roundness of the child. He has light blue wings with white reflections like the feathers of his mother's hat. He is holding a honeycomb, possibly taken from a hole towards the bottom of the tree trunk. A swarm of bees from the honeycomb have landed on his arms and the tree. In contrast to other depictions, Cupid does not scream or flee from the bees. His expression is sullen, and he is turning to Venus for comfort but she does not display any compassion. With this episode, Cranach is attempting to convey a message to the viewer by showing Cupid suffering from the same kind of anguish that he causes to mankind with the shooting of his arrows.

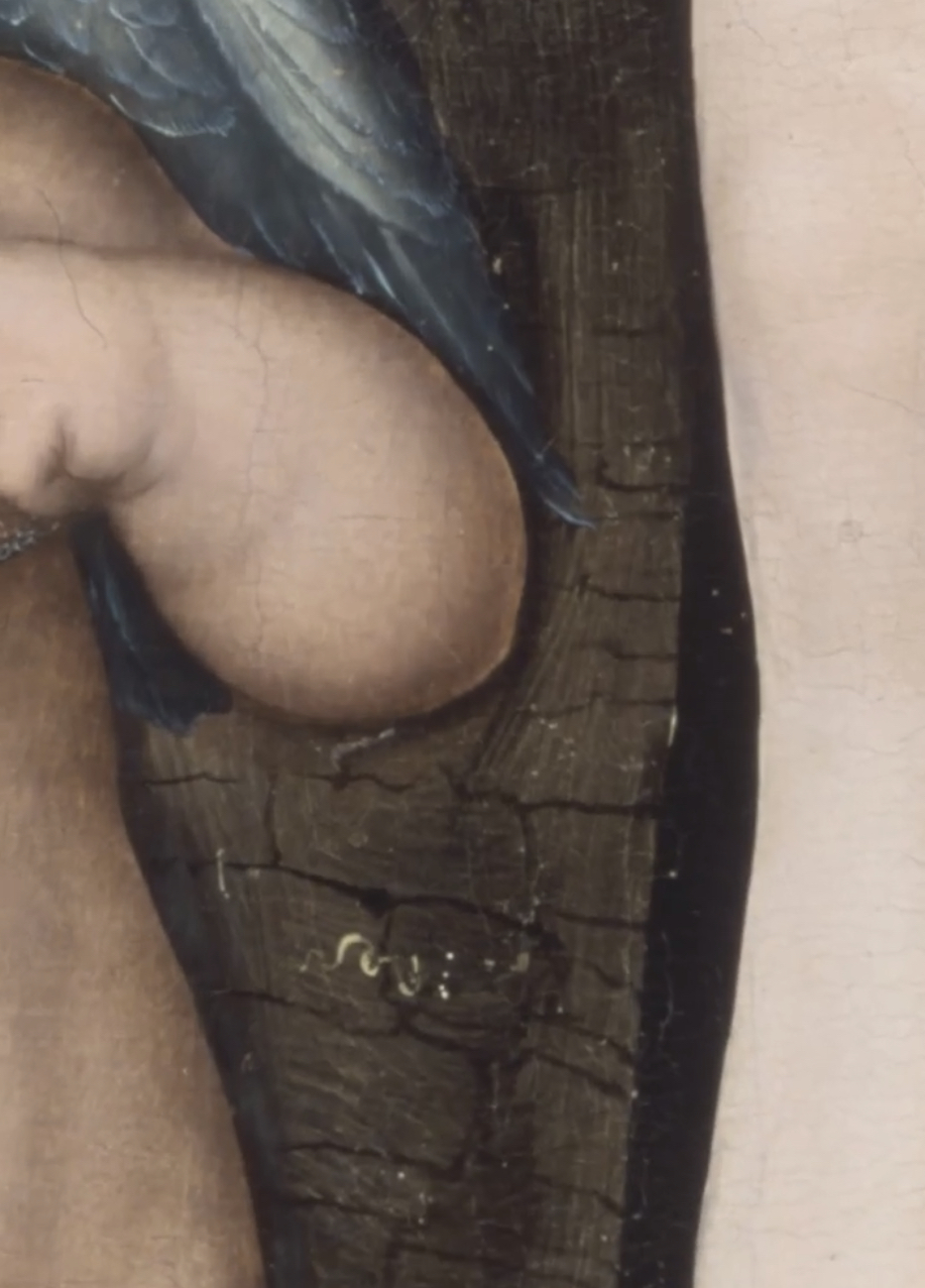
The painting date of creation

The setting of the painting invokes both Arcadia due to the nudity of the characters and the early 1500s due to the Northern Renaissance-style hat, hairstyle, and necklace. It deals with the universal and eternal theme of love and pain. The moralizing explanation is made explicit by the distich. The moralist Chelidonius emphasizes that voluptas (short-lived 'pleasures' or 'delights') are accompanied by pain; the reference is to promiscuity. The painting is regarded as an allegory of the pleasures and pains of love, as well as a possible warning of the risks of venereal disease, which was widespread among the soldiers of the continent's wars. The denunciation of casual relationships and of the most diffuse diseases, such as syphilis, is evident from the representation made of Venus. The meaning behind this picture is described in a moral couplet by Chelidonius, situated in the upper right corner of the painting.

=== Execution date ===
The painting was most likely completed in 1531, as was indicated by an inscription that was once visible on the tree trunk, bearing the initials and the date of creation in the center of the composition. This inscription was later interpreted by Paola Della Pergola in 1959 and Kristina Herrmann Fiore in 2010 as being part of a symbol of a winged snake. There is still a legible inscription of initials on the trunk in the center of the composition.

=== Cranach's style ===
Cranach's style inVenus and Cupid with the Honeycomb is influenced by the Danube school, of which Cranach was a founder member. This explains why the painted lines in the image of Venus and Cupid with the Honeycomb are delicate and graceful. As seen in the character of Venus, this has resulted in a nearly stylized representation of the figures. The picture also contains Gothic-era influences. Cranach features his characters in a dark natural setting. The background's melancholy stands out as being in stark contrast to the characters' recreation. The majority of their figures are submerged in dense forests under an ominous sky, which significantly foreshadows the later Romantic concept of transcendence.

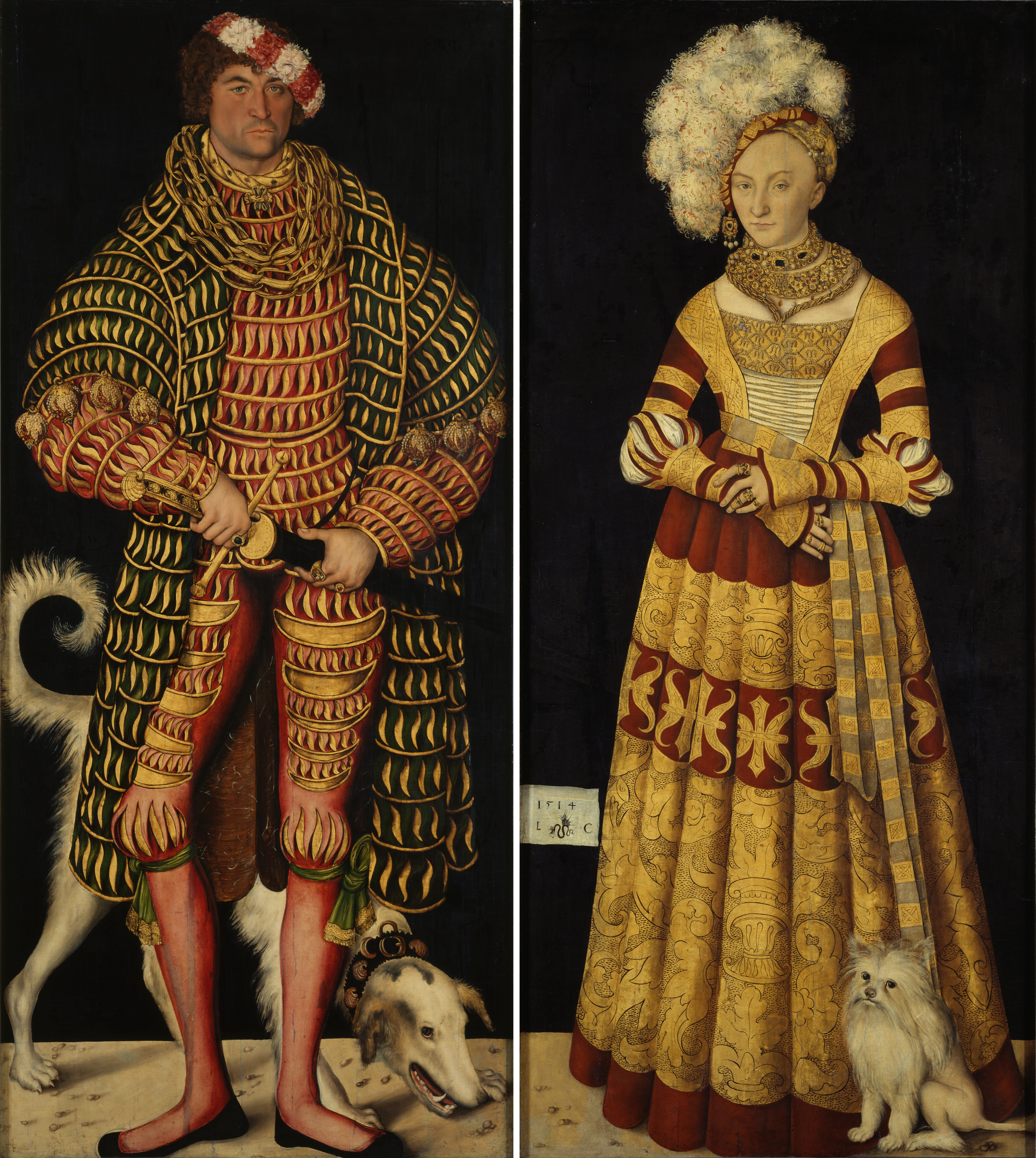
Portraits of Henry IV of Saxony and Catherine of Macklenburg by Lucas Cranach

Cranach's Venus and Cupid with the Honeycomb displays Cranach's propensity to incorporate moral allegories. It was painted shortly after Martin Luther released his Ninety-five Theses in 1517 and reflects the common themes of German paintings from this period including moral allegories, idealized nudes, and spiritual elements. The style reflects some of the techniques that he had experimented with during his years spent at court. Cranach's studies of Venus's body in this and other works are similar to those he represented in official portraits painted in the same period, including his painting of the full figure of the Dukes of Saxony, Henry the Pious, and of Catherine of Mecklenburg.

The style reflects Cranach's meticulous attention to detail and research, as in Venus's headgear, which is typical of Cranach's time.

Venus and Cupid with the Honeycomb, like many of Cranach's later works, shows how much the artist foresaw the future and how avant-garde he was for his time, inspiring numerous painters, including Picasso, Otto Dix, and John Currin.

== Inspiration ==
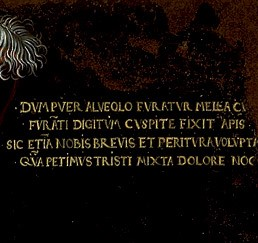
Latin text presented on the top right corner of the painting Venus and Cupid with the Honeycomb

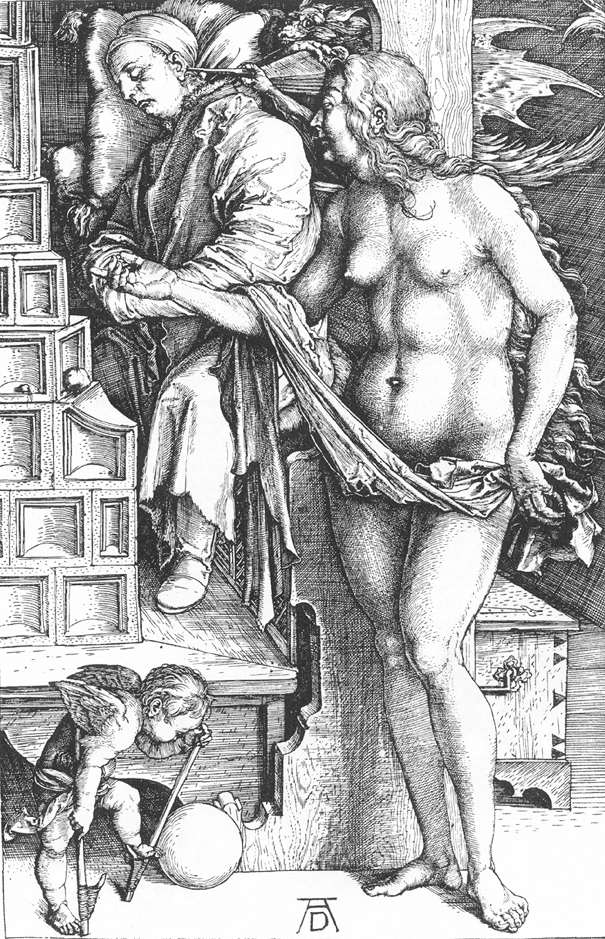
The dream of the doctor or The Temptation of the Idler by Albrecht Dürer

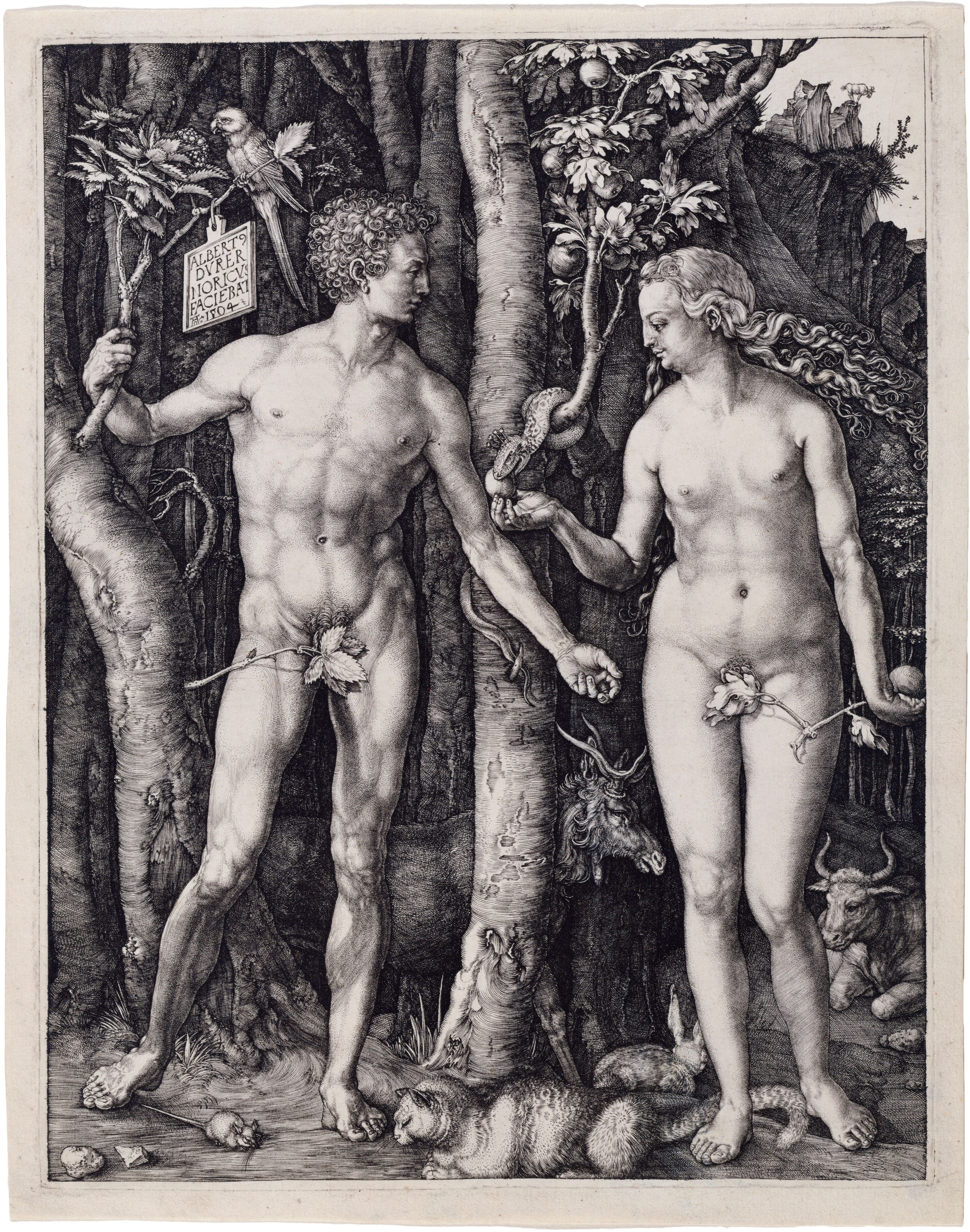
Albrecht Dürer, Adam and Eve, 1504, Engraving

One of the most important influences from which the painting took inspiration is the engraving 'The Dream of the Doctor' by Albrecht Dürer, characterized by the whole figure of Venus on the right and Cupid on the left. Cranach also incorporated from this work the veil worn by the woman and the movement of her arms.,

Other influences, like the woodcut of the 'Triumph of the New Men over the Satyrs', also contribute to the full-length depiction of Venus without clothing, made in the early 16th century by Jacopo de' Barbari. He was a Venetian artist in the service of the court of Frederick III of Saxony, known as Frederick the Wise. Cranach replaced him in the court in 1505.

Cranch also drew inspiration in Dürer's engraving of Adam and Eve from 1507. Dürer's focus on the right arm's extending detail and the Y-shaped tree behind the two protagonists particularly influenced Cranach. The 'Y' shape refers to the crossroads between the via virtutis and the via voluptas.

=== Mythological background ===
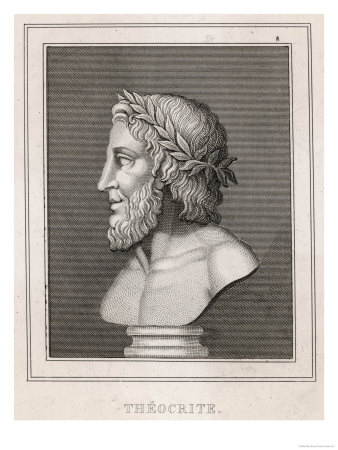
Greek poet Theocritus' portrait

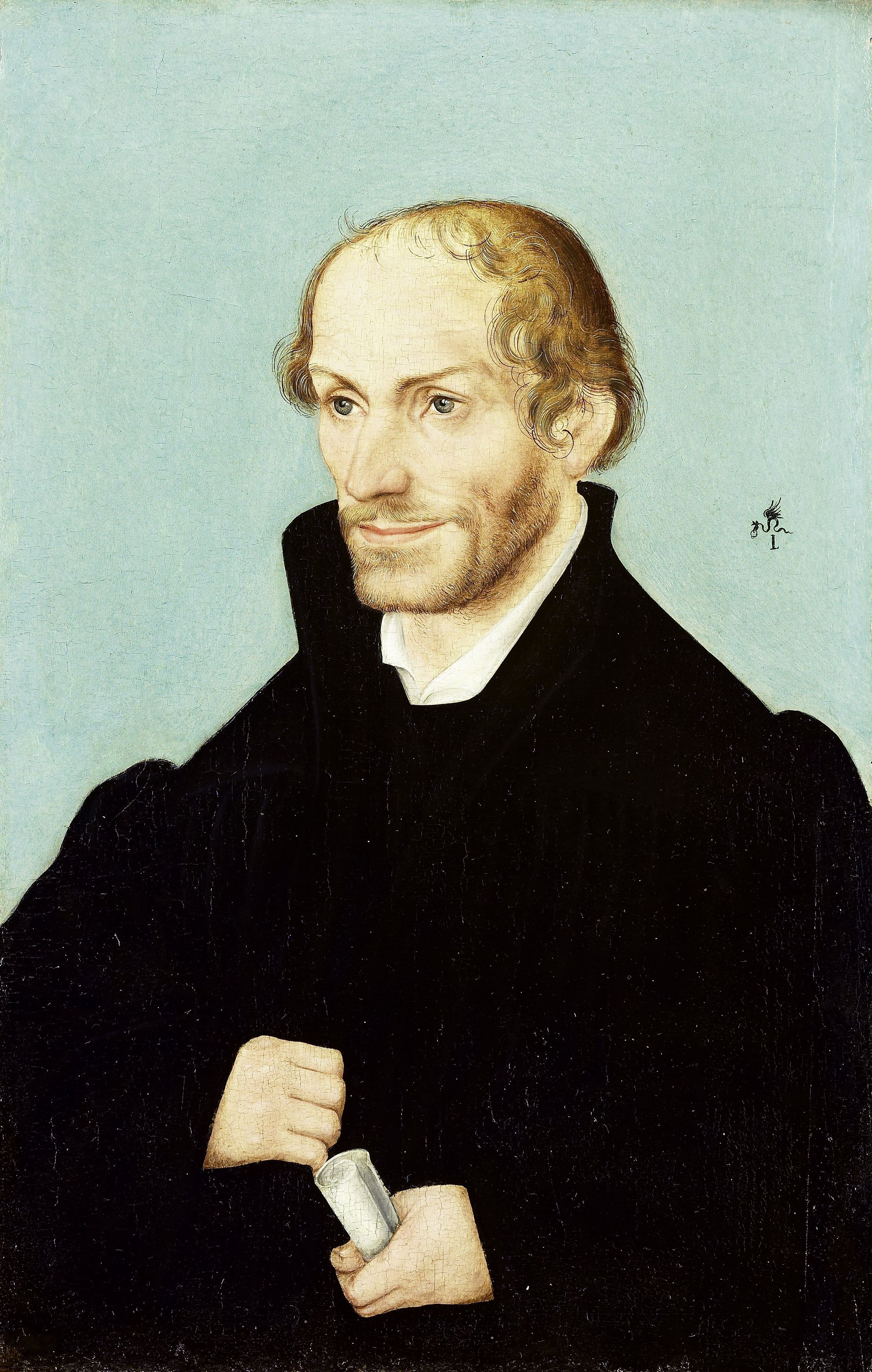
Philip Melanchton's portrait by Lucas Cranach the Elder

The painting is based on the classical mythological characters of Cupid and Venus. Venus, the goddess of beauty and fertility, is the mother of Cupid, the god of passionate love. In this painting, a woman from the Court of Saxony takes on the role of Venus. She wears an iconic hat of the time, but the Latin lines on the top right-hand corner transport the figure into the classical world. This painting dates back to the Renaissance, a period in which bees and honey were considered symbols of pleasure, as were the two deities represented in the painting.

The subject of this painting is taken from the Theocritean Idyll XIX, in which the representative of pastoral poetry recounts Cupid being stung by a bee while stealing a honeycomb from the hive. After manifesting his pain with screams and kicks, he flew to his mother Venus and complained to her. She replied that Cupid is like the bee: small but capable of inflicting painful wounds. Venus' answer alludes to Cupid's explosive force, capable of leading human beings to the loss of reason or to destruction. Bee stings correspond to the wounds caused by Cupid's arrows, which make humans victims of a painful desire for love (voluptas).

Venus doesn't appear to be affected by the circumstances. She looks insensitive to her child's suffering. In this painting, Cranach intended to portray the human will to resist temptation rather than maternity.

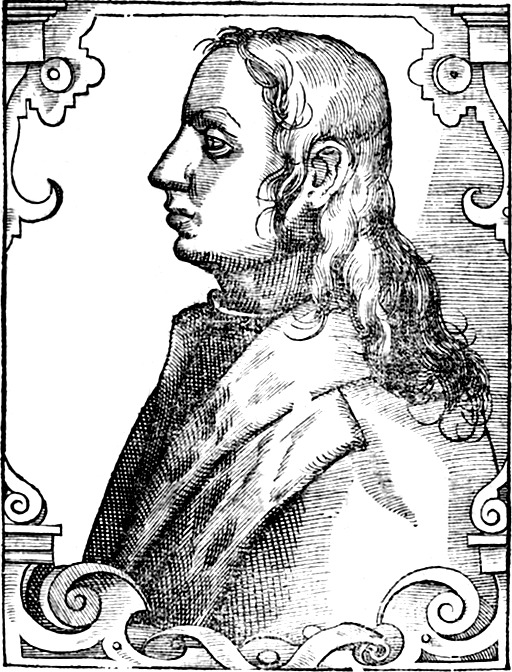
Ercole Strozzi's engraving

The four-line inscription taken from Latin translations of Theocritus is variously attributed to Ercole Strozzi, Philip Melanchthon, or Georg Sabinus. The couplet conveys the idea that the sweetness of Venus' pleasures causes inevitable pain. The depictions of Venus and the Latin verse both demonstrate the artist's dedication to sharing the story and its lesson. Following the Latin humanistic tradition, Cranach also addresses the learned viewer. In the traditional title of the painting, Venus and Cupid with the Honeycomb, the "theft" element is missing, while it is instead contained in the Greek "keriokleptes".

This moralising approach was adopted by Melanchthon's scholar Georg Sabinus, who edited the first Latin translation of the Theocritean Idylls, published in Georg Rhau's music book Enchiridion utriusque musicae practicae (1536). Here, a possible interpretation of Venus and Cupid with the Honeycomb might be found. In such a book, Georg Rhau depicts Venus and Cupid in Cranach's paintings from a theological perspective. At those times, gods were one of the most popular subjects painted by German artists because they represent moral and spiritual qualities and are the ideal subject to draw in viewers.

=== Modern analysis ===
Venus and Cupid with the Honeycomb is highly regarded because Cranach progressed several techniques that were unheard of or underdeveloped at the time. The elegant silhouette of Dürer's characters served as the model for Cranach's chiaroscuro woodcut as an introduction to his aesthetic canons. Cranach used a slightly lengthened figure in Venus and Cupid with the Honeycomb, as well as a dance-like step that adheres to the Flemish-Burgundian aesthetic standards of the Wittenberg court. His female nudes still exist in many copies and variations in both public and private collections around the world.

The depiction of female nudity in European art was rare before the early 16th century, emerging in the late 1520s. Due to the increasing interest of Lutheran churches in the figurative arts, Cranach had to adjust to an artistic market that was changing in this period.

== History ==
=== Provenance ===
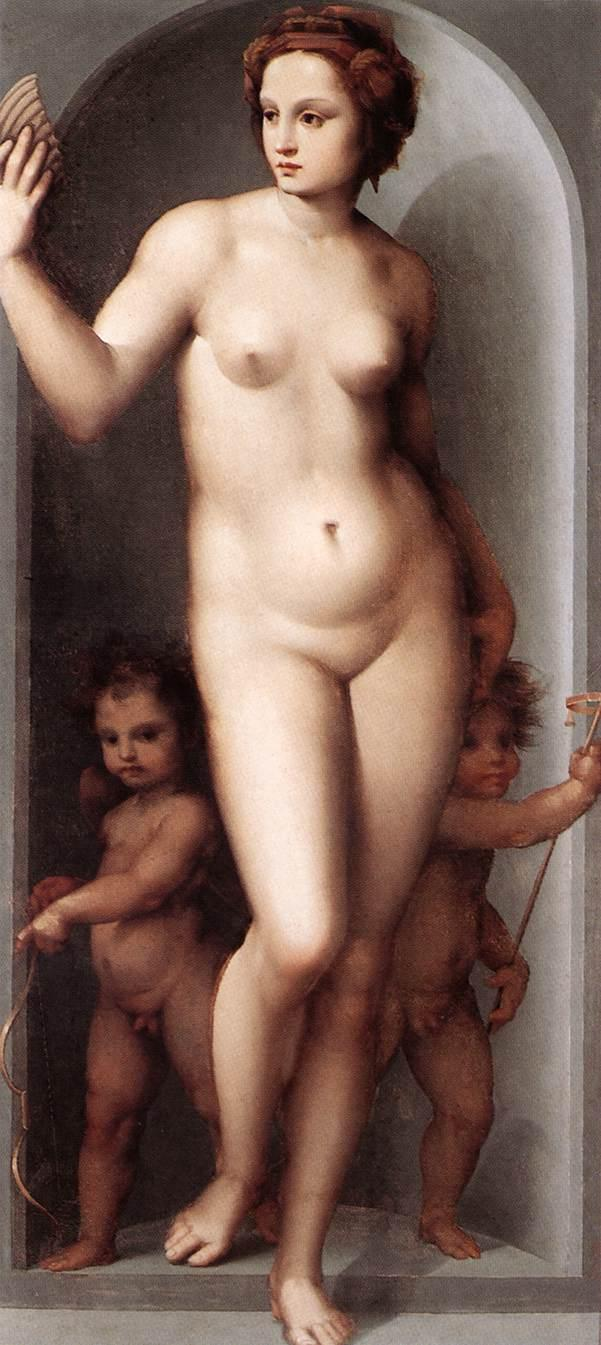
Venus and Two Cupids by Andrea del Brescianino

The origins of Venus and Cupid with the Honeycomb are not perfectly clear. Some art historians believe Cranach made the first brush strokes in the early 16th century in Wittemberg, a small town in northern Germany.

According to Kristina Herrmann Fiore, the artwork was then given to Cardinal Scipione Borghese as a gift by Paduan jurist Alvise Corradini. There is still uncertainty surrounding what followed after the picture was entrusted to the cardinal. It is known that the picture was framed by the carpenter Annibale Corradini in these years, around 1611, evidenced by an invoice recording this work.

Venus and Cupid with the Honeycomb first appeared in an art gallery in the early 17th century, alongside Venus and Two Cupids. The picture disappeared due to curious transfers from one institution to another, and it was not found again until 1883, when it resurfaced in some records that identified the painting's real creator, Cranach.

=== Conservation and Display ===
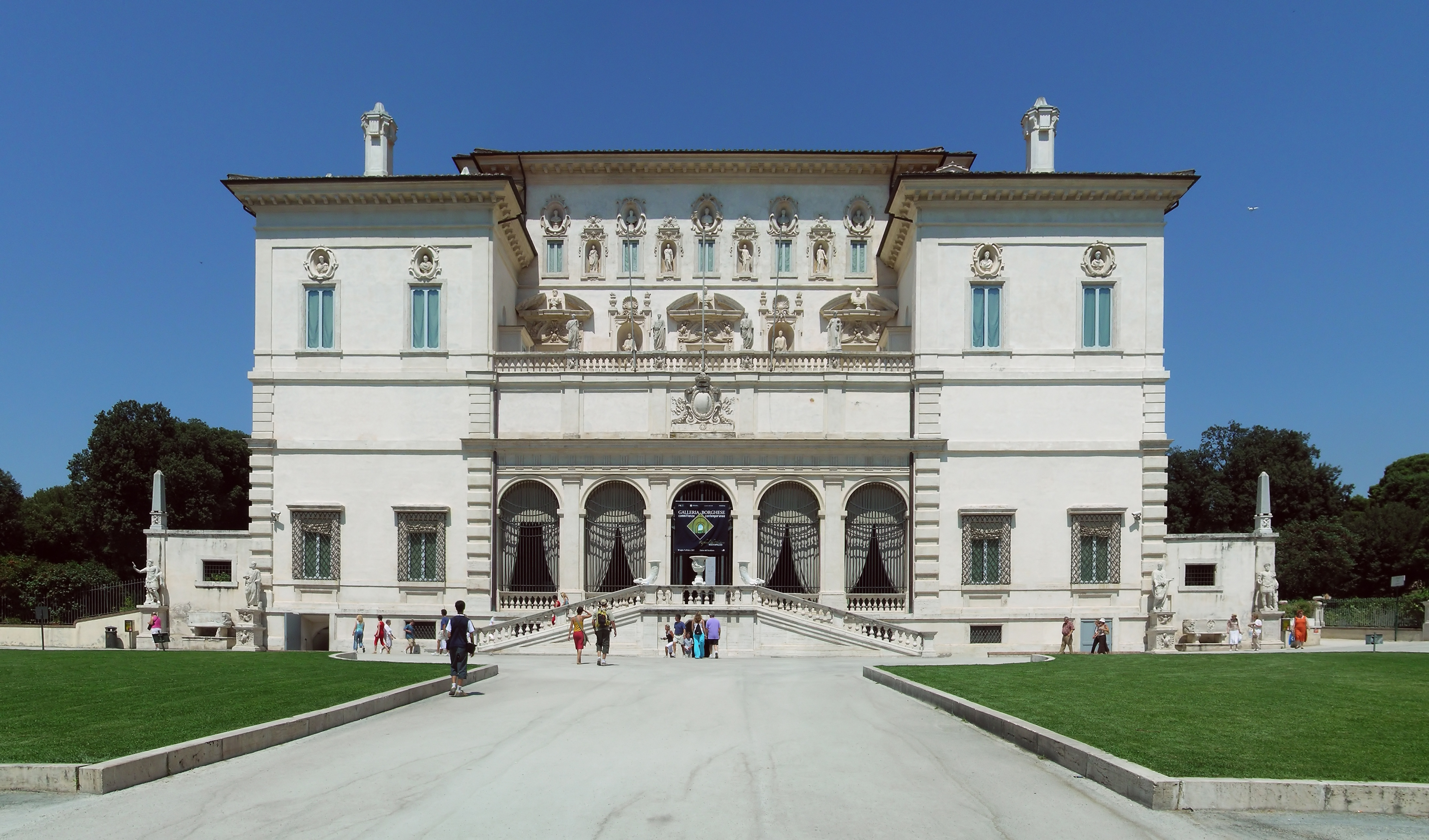
Borghese Gallery's facade in Rome

The first document related to the painting's conservation dates back to January 24, 1611, when the Scipione family recorded a note of a payment for the painting's frame prior to the placement of Venus and Cupid with a Honeycomb in the Borghese Collection.

It is now displayed in Room 10 of the Borghese Gallery in Rome, as it is an important addition to the gallery's collection of paintings by Lucas Cranach the Elder.

==== Exhibition ====
This painting has been exhibited many times in various museums, including at the Mole Antonelliana, Torino in 1992 and at the Städel Museum, Frankfurt in 2007–2008.

=== Restorations ===
- 1905 Woodworm eradication was performed by Luigi Bartolucci;
- 1933 Color correction, grouting, cleaning, and firing of small pieces of damaged colour were performed by Tito Venturini Papari;
- 1949 General picture restoration was performed by Carlo Matteucci and Oddo Verdinelli;
- 1950–51 Removal of previous repairs, leveling of the table, disinfection of woodworm, washing, and painting by Ettore Patrito;
- 1958 Frame restoration by Renato Massi;
- 1977–1978 restored the ancient parqueting, consolidated the picture, disinfected it, removed the paint that had yellowed, retouched it, and painted over any holes by Gianluigi Colalucci;
- 1992 restoration of the cornice and colour painting by Luisa Barucci;
- 2008 completed the final adjustments by Laura Ferretti.

=== Latest restoration ===
Borghese Gallery has had issues controlling the energy effectiveness of the buildings connected to the museum due to climate control system malfunctions, which have harmed the protected works and disturbed visitors. A team of engineers examined the rooms to evaluate conditions, estimating the structure's ventilation air flow rates and winter and summer heat loads. The painting board was thinned, and horizontal aluminium crosspieces used to provide secondary support.

With the exception of some paint loss along the edges (most notably in the upper right corner) and the very last letters of the Latin inscription, the painting's surface is largely well-maintained. Restoration included touching up the three middle toes on Venus' left foot and repainting a piece of the pebbled ground. It has been noted that under raking light several of the board joints and Cupid's lower limbs show paint flaking. It is not unknown if these are recent or older.

== Technical studies ==
=== Support and woodwork ===
The back of the painting is composed of a vertical arrangement of six equally sized wooden boards. Analysis shows that these boards are mainly made with lime wood, a type of wood used in many of the painter's other works. The support consists of beech wood, one of the wood types favored by Cranach in the 1520s and 1530s, despite it being a hard wood that is easily destroyed by woodworm. An analysis of the surface of the painting in the 1950s indicated that the original dimensions of the painting had been enlarged as a result of an earlier restoration, possibly in the 18th century.

=== Underdrawing ===
The underdrawing is only partially visible to the naked eye. It is made up of outlines and is barely perceptible behind the figures' profiles. It describes the finer characteristics of the hands and faces. The black background paint, which continues to the edge of the figurines, covered the remaining areas, which were painted in a dilute grey-black medium. The artist strengthened some of the features during the finishing process, further complicating an interpretation. The figure's initial location is also indicated by a sequence of highly fluid lines that trace the contours of Venus' arms, legs, and some of her torso, which all appear to have been drawn with a paintbrush.

=== Paint Layers and Gilding ===
Analysis shows The painter used a limited palette in terms of the colours employed and a preference for straightforward combinations and layerings. The tree trunk was painted using greyish-brown brushstrokes rather than brown ones, with the addition of black pigment to brown earths to better match the background and make use of the visible white ground.

Under Cupid's feet there is some verdigris with white lead in the grassy vegetation. With regard to the representation of the terrain, the author chose to initially draw the outlines of the stones and then fill them in with a grey and white stain, after which shadows were added and the edges were blurred with black paint.

In order to create the shadows for the flesh, a mix of lead white and vermilion was employed, along with either ochre or earth and black. The highlights were applied last, as shown by the raking light. To highlight Venus' temple veins, black was used, while for her lips a vermilion colour made from madder (Rubia tinctoria). The hat was painted using a similar mixture with the addition of black to help with shading modulation.

Azurite was used to paint Cupid's wings, while white was used to highlight the feathers' hatching. The lettering and a small portion of the hair were coloured with lead-tin yellow, while the honeycomb was coloured with yellow ochre. To create the black dots, brown earth was used (without manganese). The bees were painted using the same brown and black colours.

There is a lot of zinc in the dark background. The artist may have employed an earth pigment rich in zinc and black colours, given the consistent ratio of zinc to iron.

== Other paintings on the same theme ==
Cranach and other painters produced, in the German sphere, a number of oil paintings on a similar these, depicting profane subjects, such as apologues, myths, hunting scenes, genre oils, still lifes and pictures. More than forty Venuses with or without Cupid were produced by Cranach and his factory. Artists incorporating the same theme as Venus and Cupid with a Honeycomb include Hans Brosamer and Odoardo Fialetti.

=== Related paintings by Cranach ===
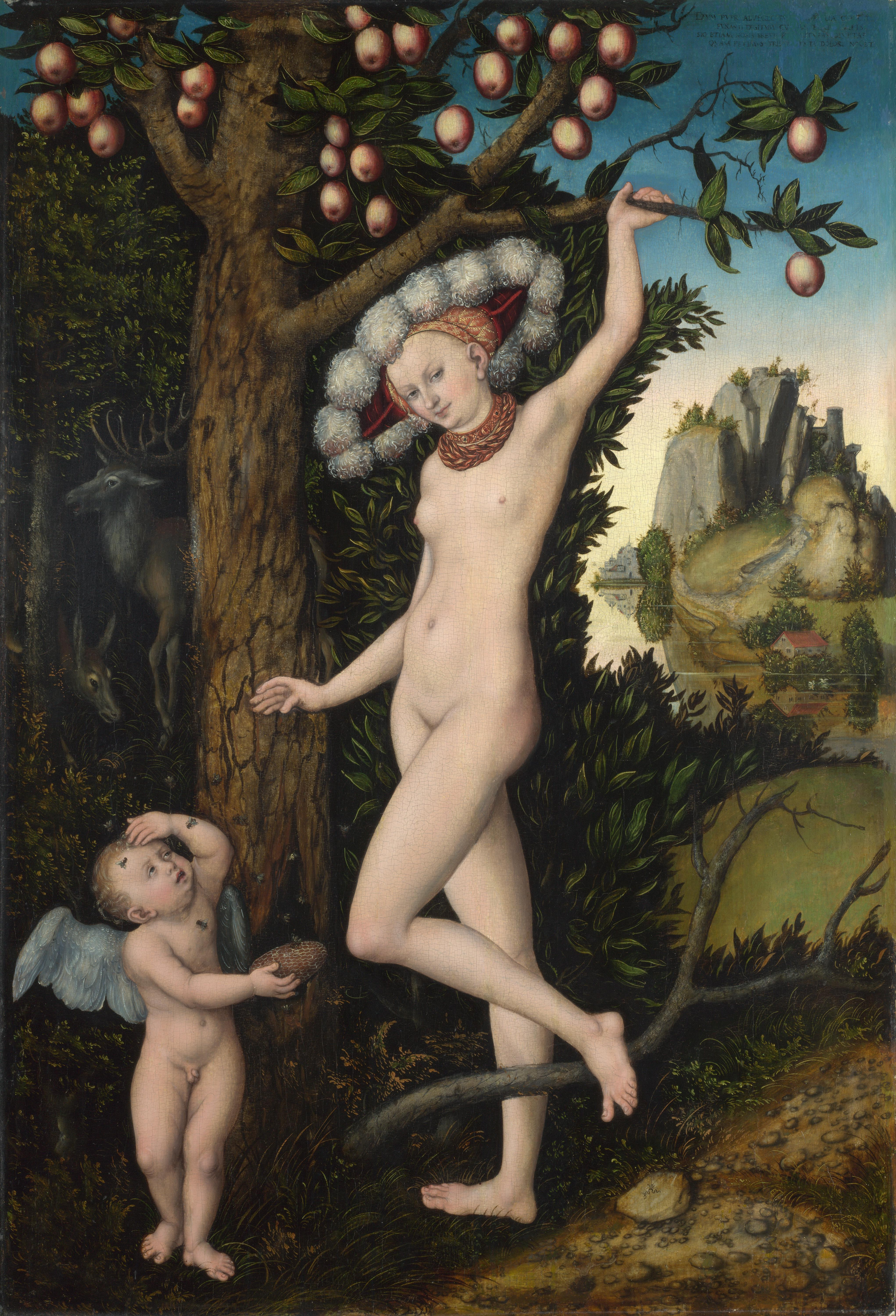
Lucas Cranach d.Ä. – Cupid complaining to Venus, National Gallery, London, 1526–1527

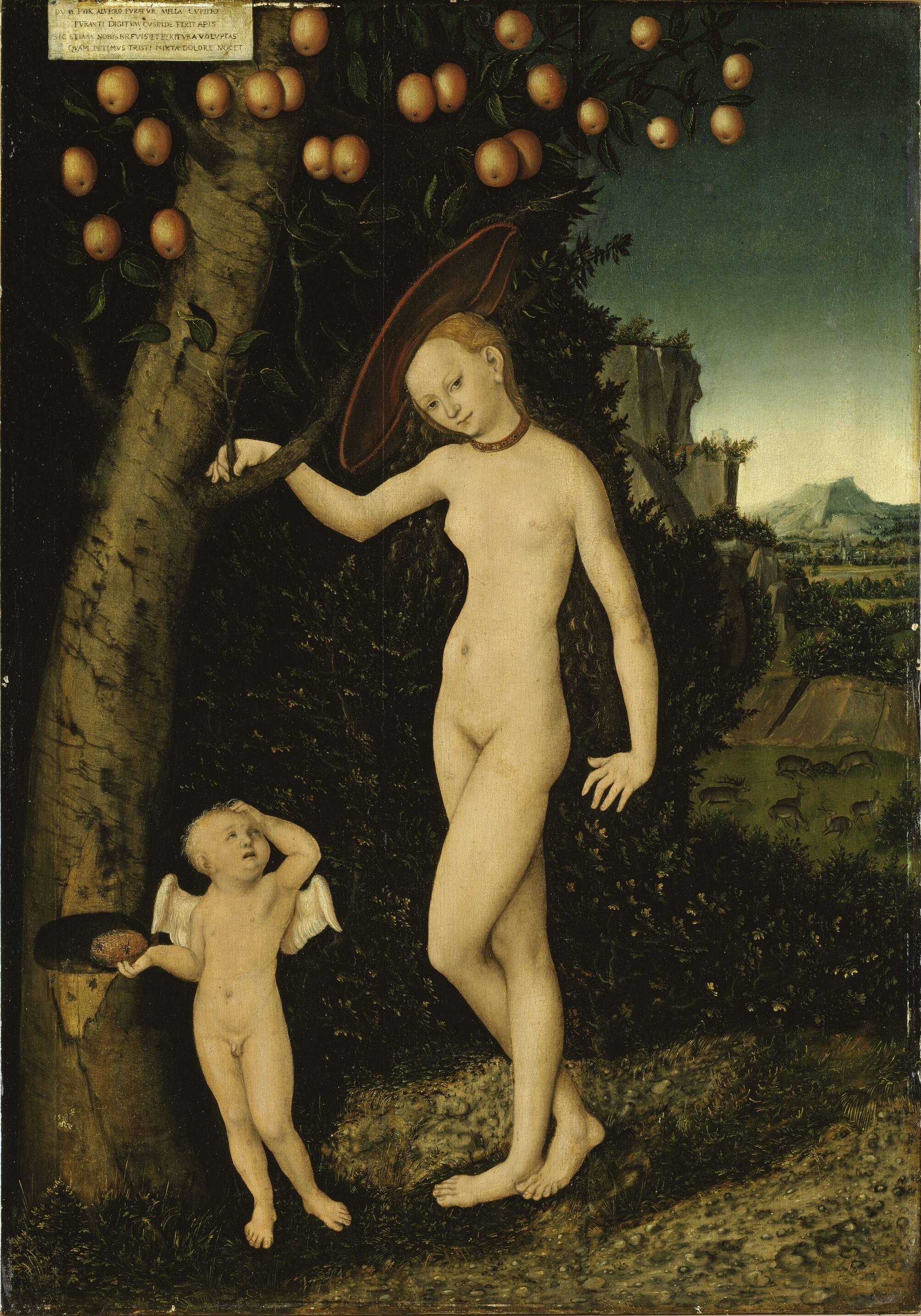
Lucas Cranach d.Ä. – Venus mit Amor als Honigdieb (Venus with Cupid as honey thieves), Schloss Güstrow, 1527

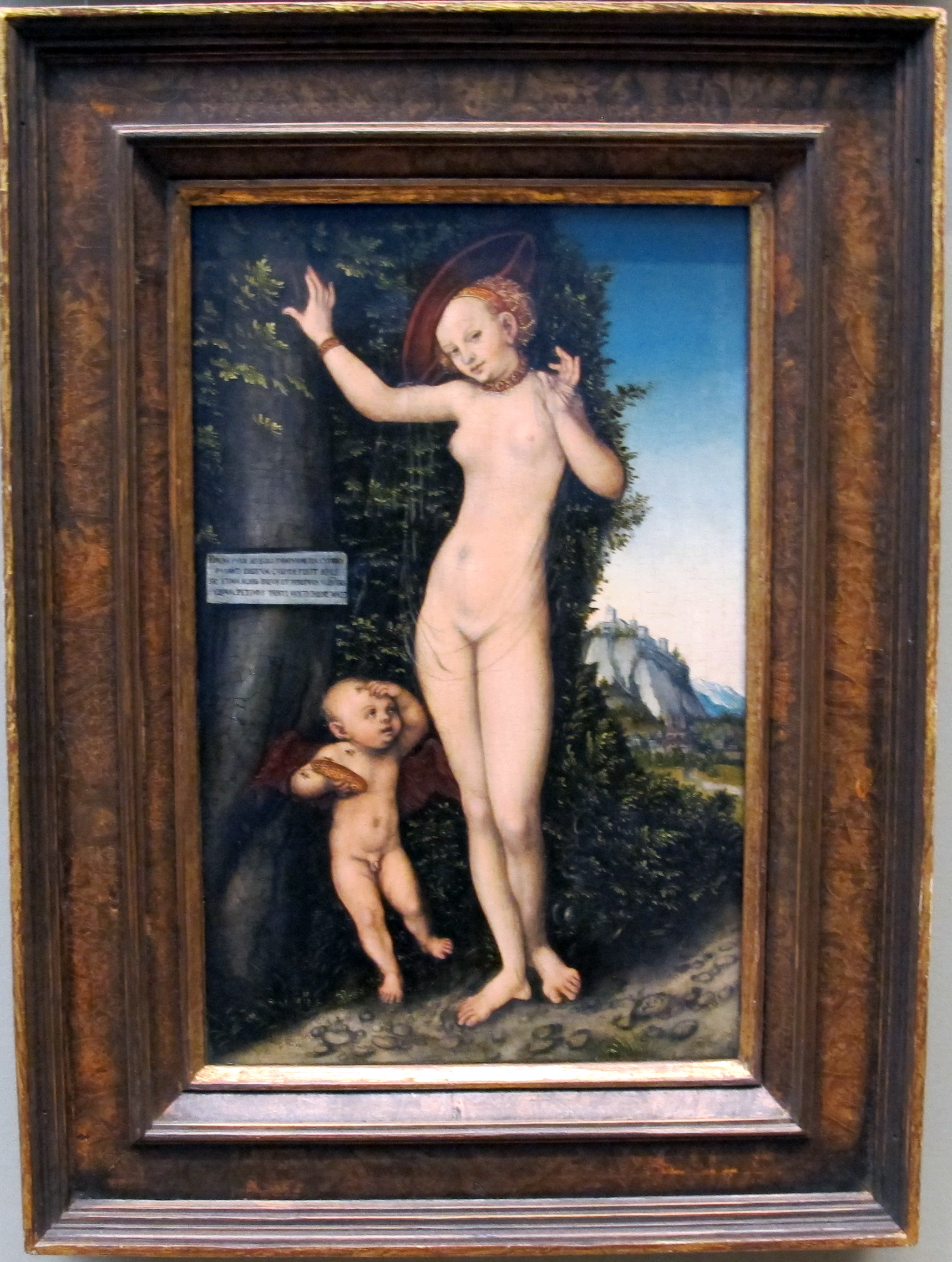
Lucas Cranach d.Ä. – Venus und Amor als Honigdieb (Venus and Cupid as honey thieves), National Gallery, London, 1529

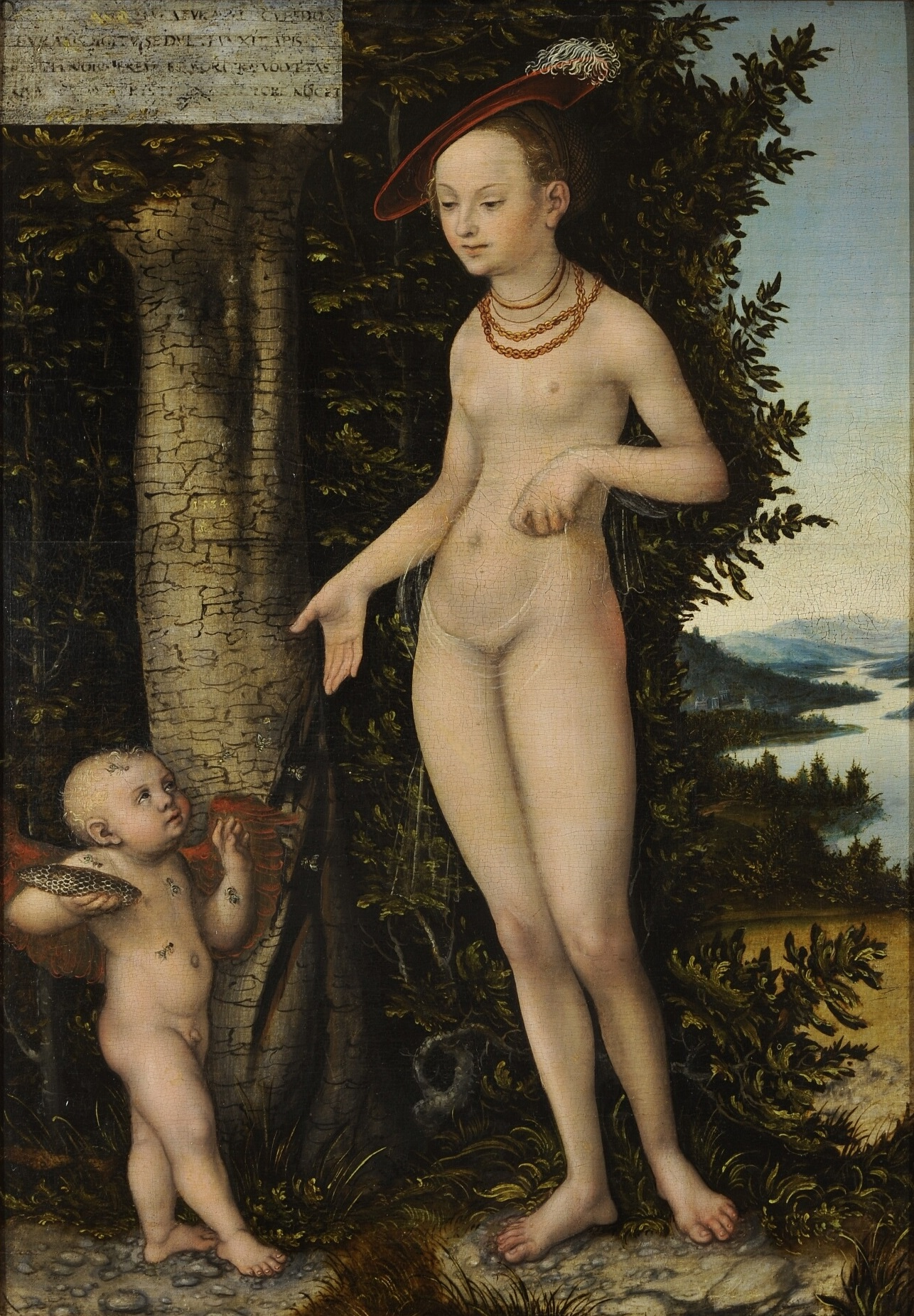
Lucas Cranach d.Ä. – Venus und Amor als Honigdieb (Venus and Cupid as honey thieves), Fränkische Galerie, 1534

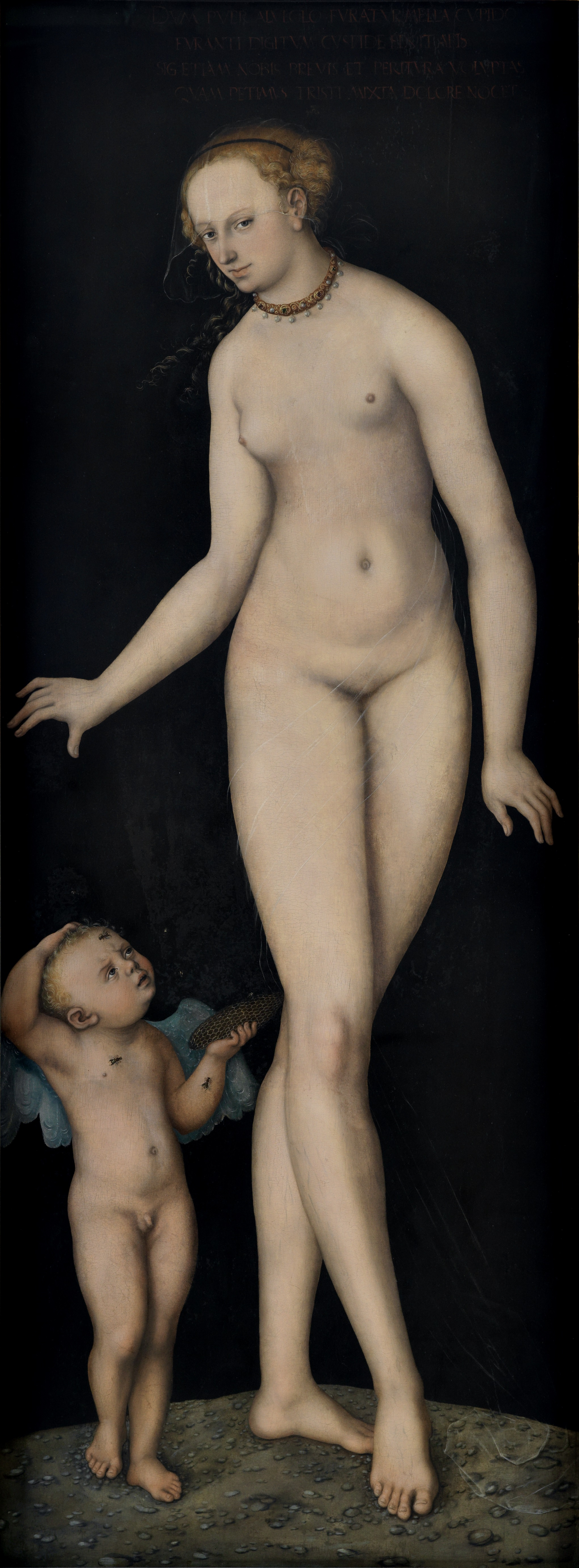
Lucas Cranach d.Ä. – Venus mit Amor als Honigdieb (Venus with Cupid as honey thieves), Germanisches Nationalmuseum, Nuremberg, after 1537

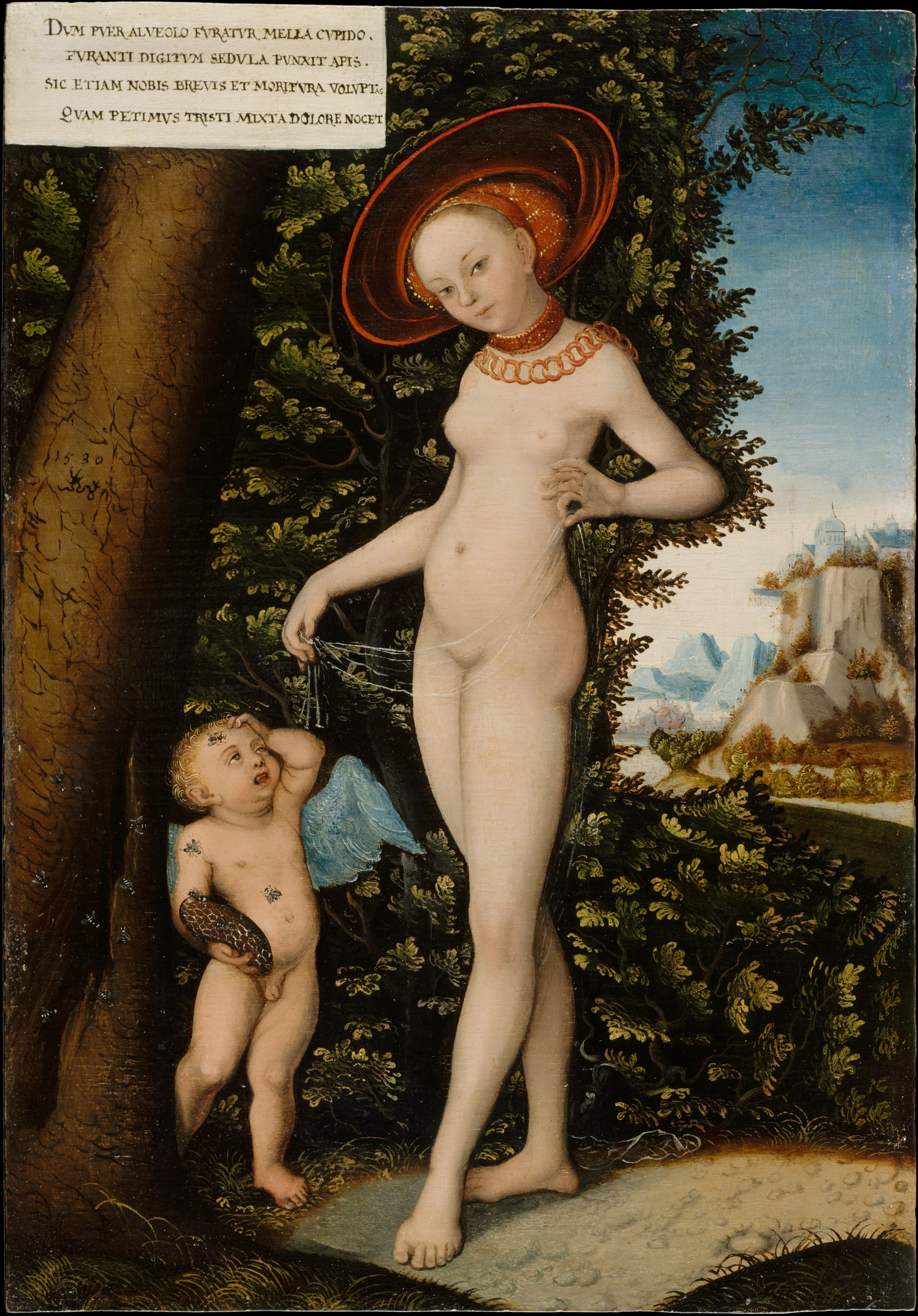
Lucas Cranach d.Ä. – Venus mit Amor als Honigdieb (Venus with Cupid as honey thieves), Metropolitan Museum of Art, 1580–1620

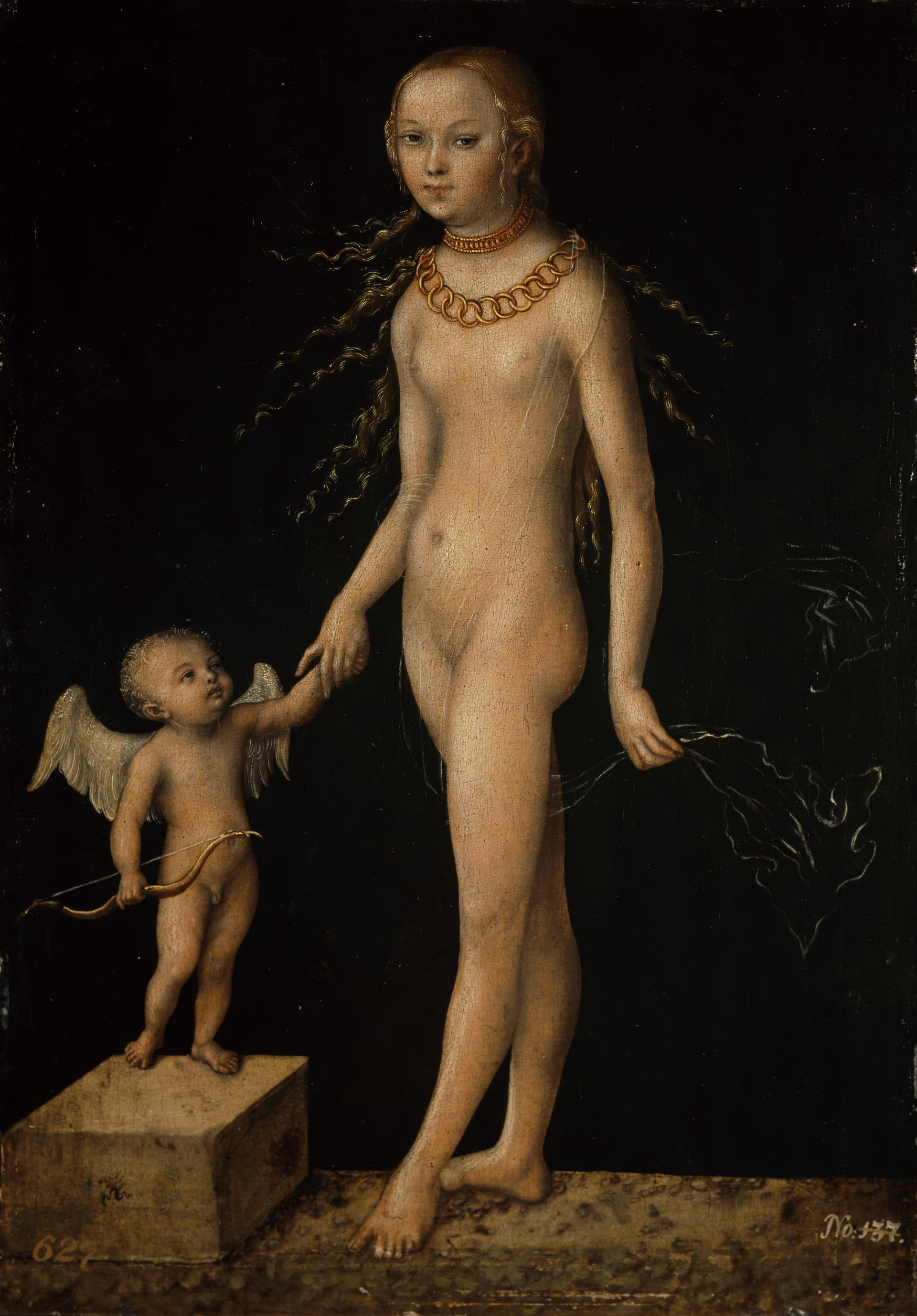
Lucas Cranach d.Ä. – Venus und Amor (Venus and Cupid), National Galleries of Scotland, 1472–1553

=== Related paintings by other artists ===
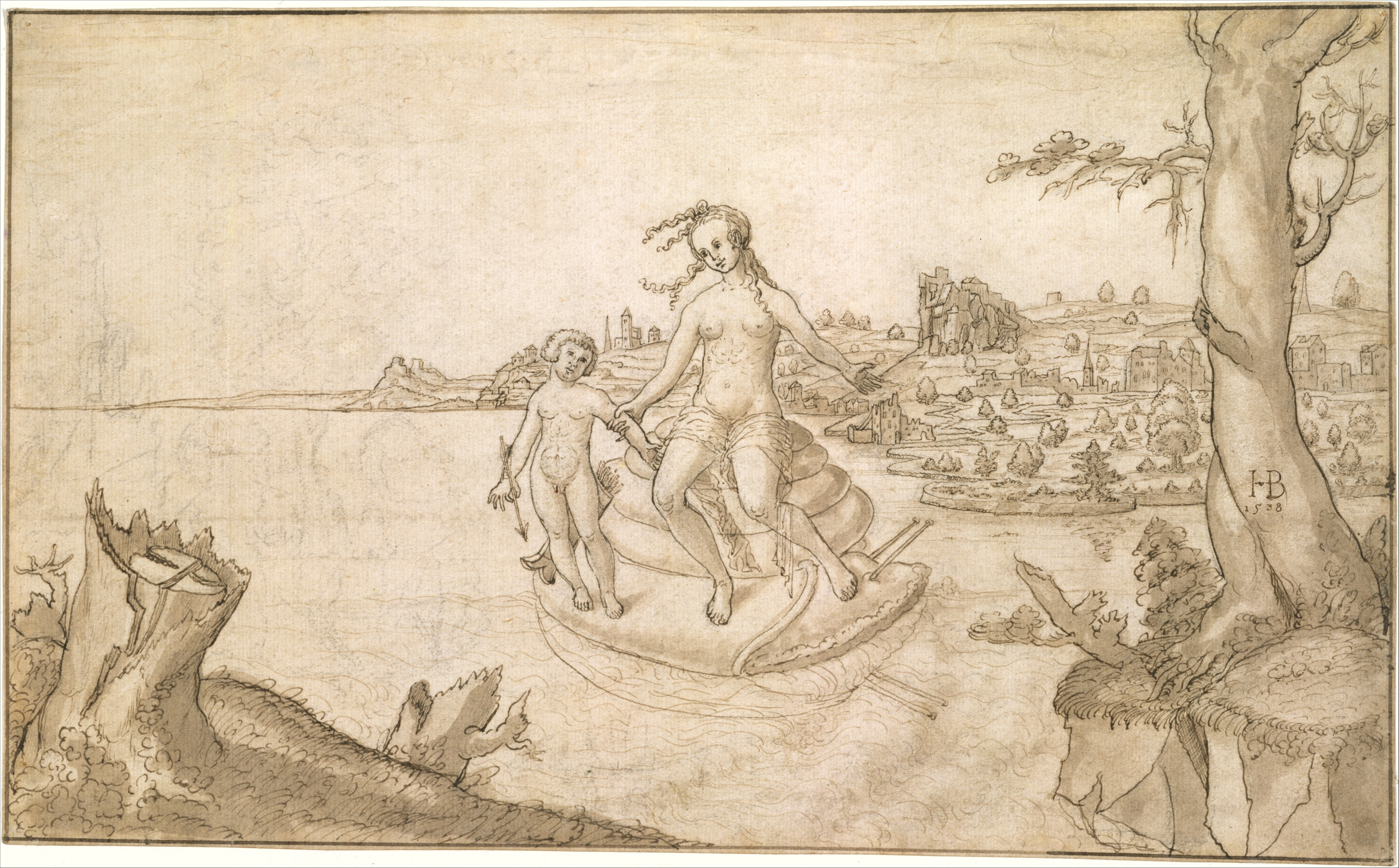
Hans Brosamer – Venus and Cupid on a Snail, The Metropolitan Museum of Art, 1538

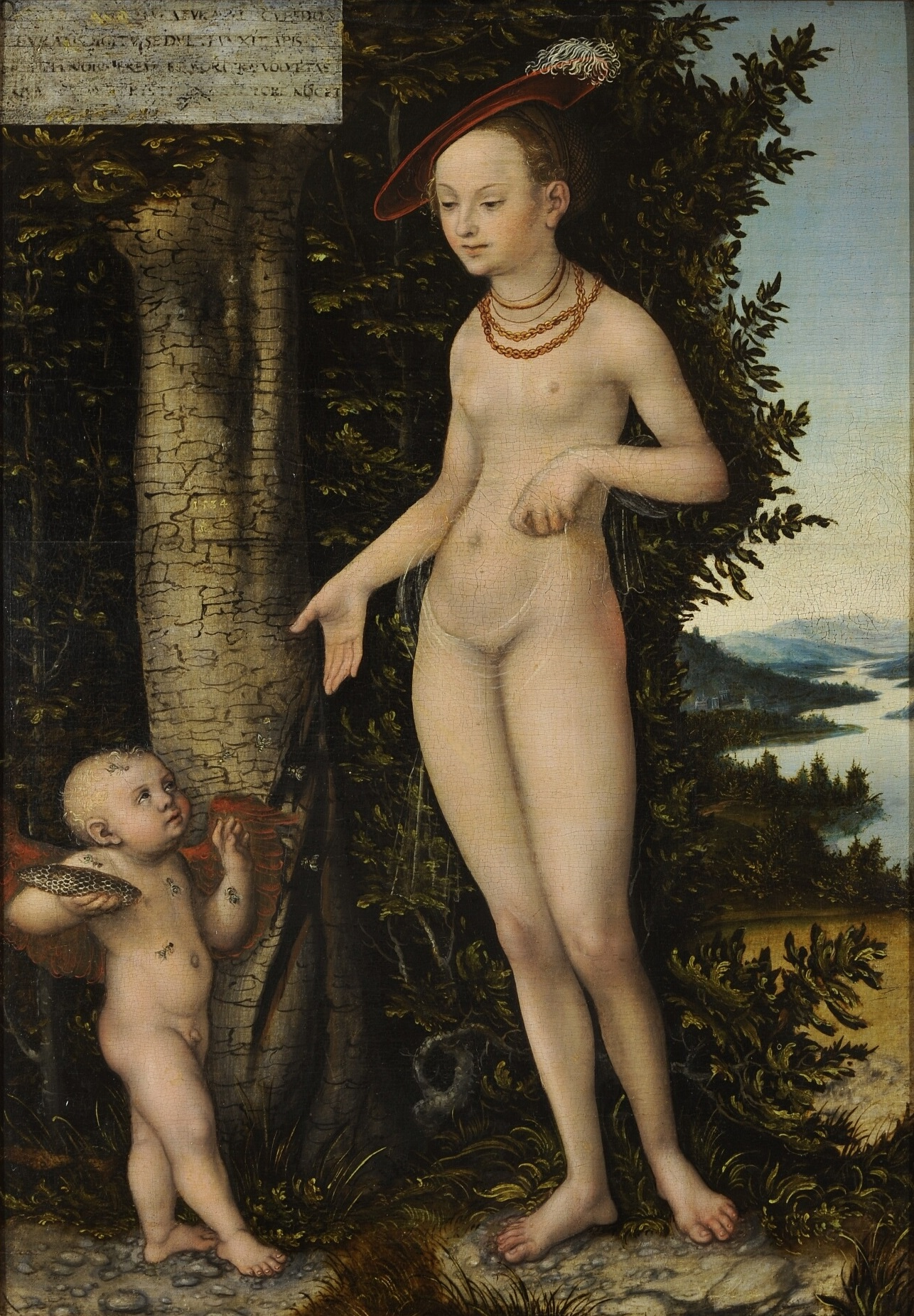
Hans Brosamer – Venus und Amor als Honigdieb (Venus and Cupid as honey thieves), Fränkische Galerie, 1534

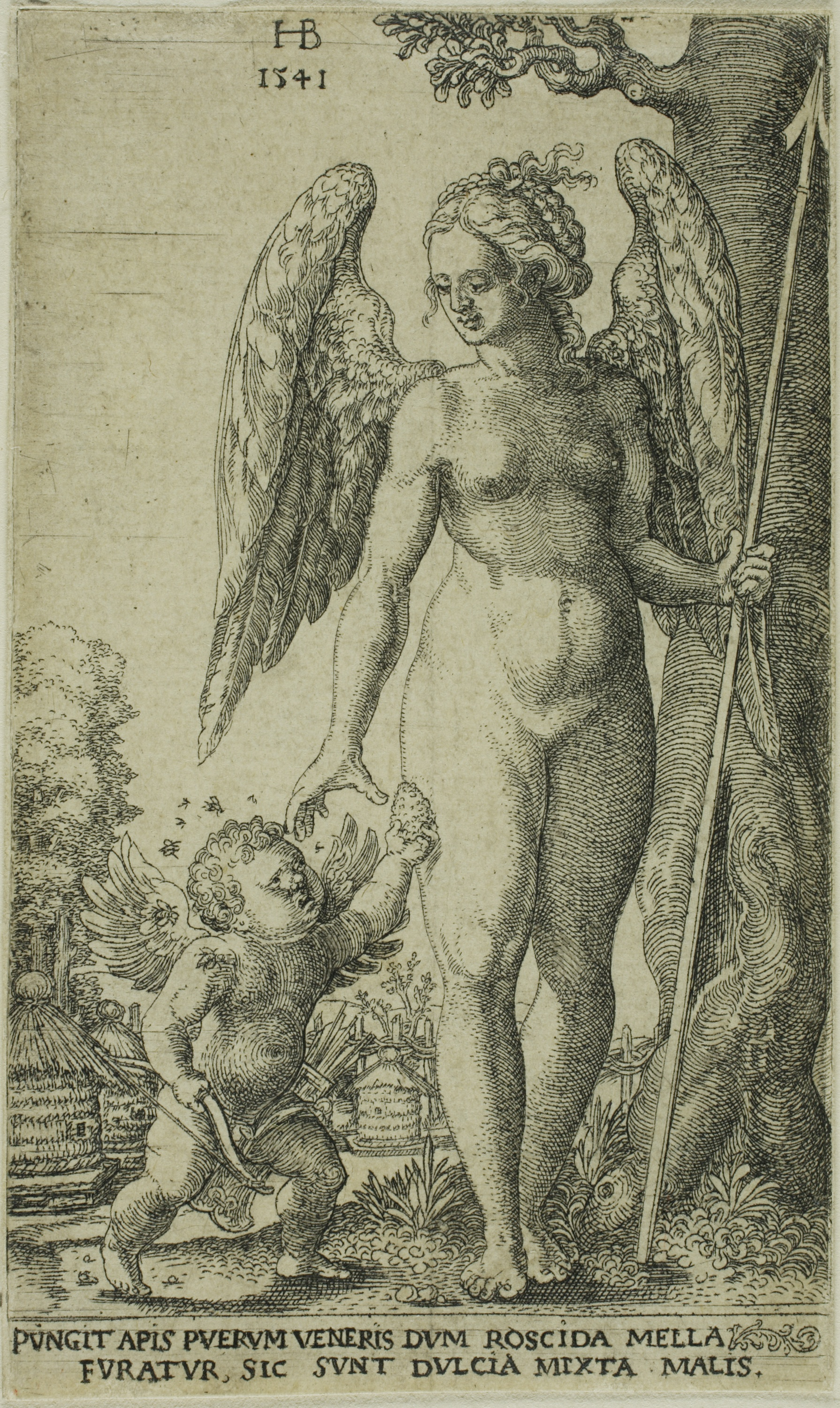
Hans Brosamer - Cupid Bringing and Honeycomb to Venus, 1548

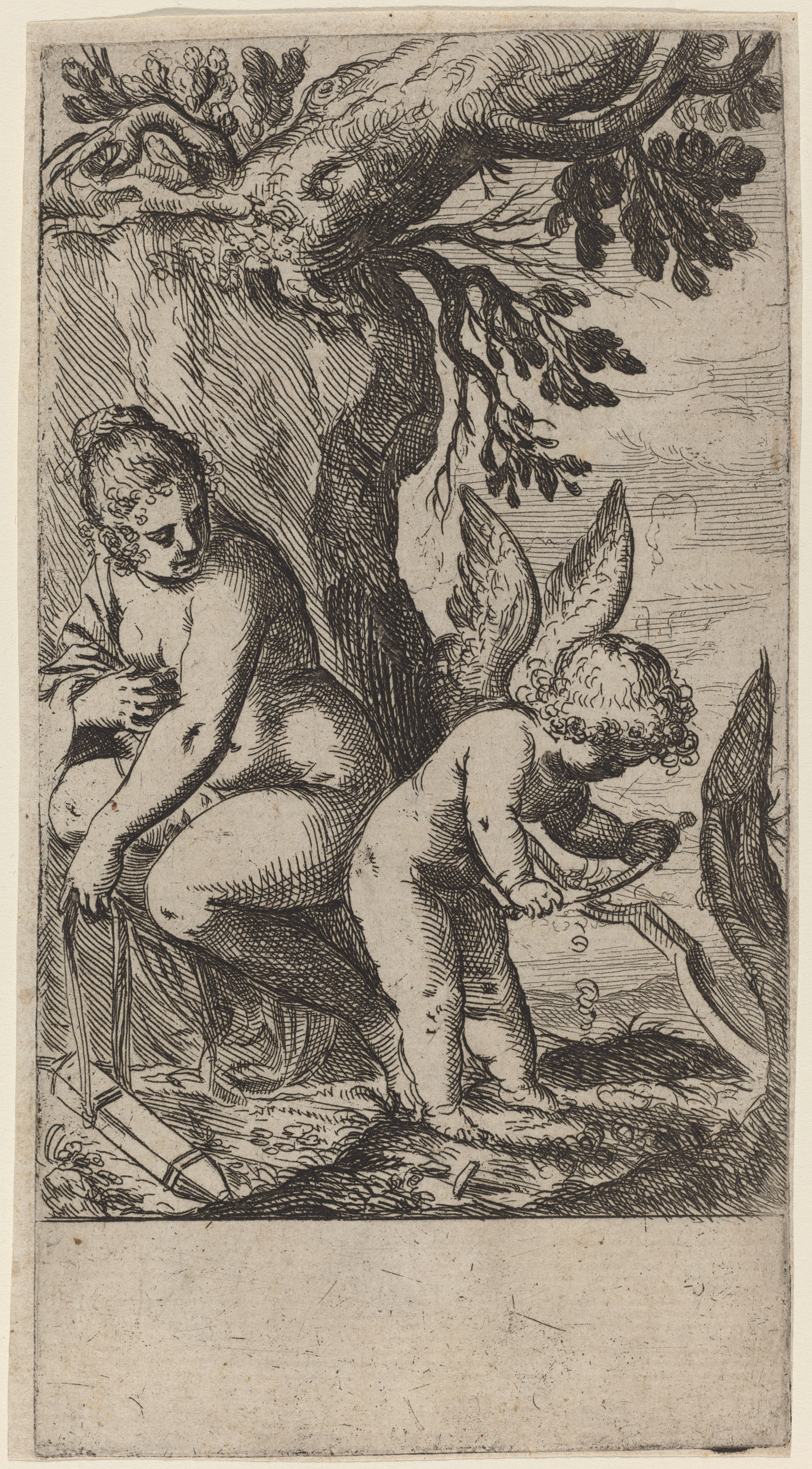
Odoardo Fialetti - Venus with Cupid Whittling His Bow, Metropolitan Museum of Art, 1580–1620

== See also ==
- Lucas Cranach the Elder
- Cupid complaining to Venus
- German Renaissance
