= Melchior Acontius =

German poet (1515–1569)

Melchior Acontius (1515, Oberursel (Taunus) – 22 June 1569) was a German poet.

He was born in Oberursel (Taunus) near Frankfurt am Main and lived in Wittenberg during the first half of the 16th century. He was a close friend of fellow poet Georg Sabinus and wrote epithalamies on the marriage of the latter with the daughter of Philipp Melanchthon. Sabinus included these dedications among his own creations. Acontius was also friends with another contemporary poet, Jacob Micyllus.

== Sources ==
- Allgemeine Deutsche Biographie - online version
