= Idyll XIX =

Greek poem attributed to Theocritus

Idyll XIX, also titled Κηριοκλέπτης ('The Honey-Stealer'), is a poem doubtfully ascribed to the third-century BC Greek poet Theocritus. Eros complains of the painful stings inflicted by the small bees, and Aphrodite laughingly compares them to the bittersweet darts of love shot by Eros himself.

== Analysis ==
According to J. M. Edmonds, this little poem probably belongs to a later date than the Bucolic writers, and was brought into the collection merely owing to its resemblance to the Runaway Love of Moschus. The motif is that of a well-known Anacreontic Ode. The idyll has been translated into French by Ronsard.

== See also ==
- Cupid Complaining to Venus
- Venus and Cupid with a Honeycomb

== Sources ==
Attribution:

- Edmonds, J. M., ed. (1919). The Greek Bucolic Poets (3rd ed.). William Heinemann. pp. 233–5.
- Lang, Andrew, ed. (1880). Theocritus, Bion, and Moschus. London: Macmillan and Co. p. 95.
