= Rania gens =

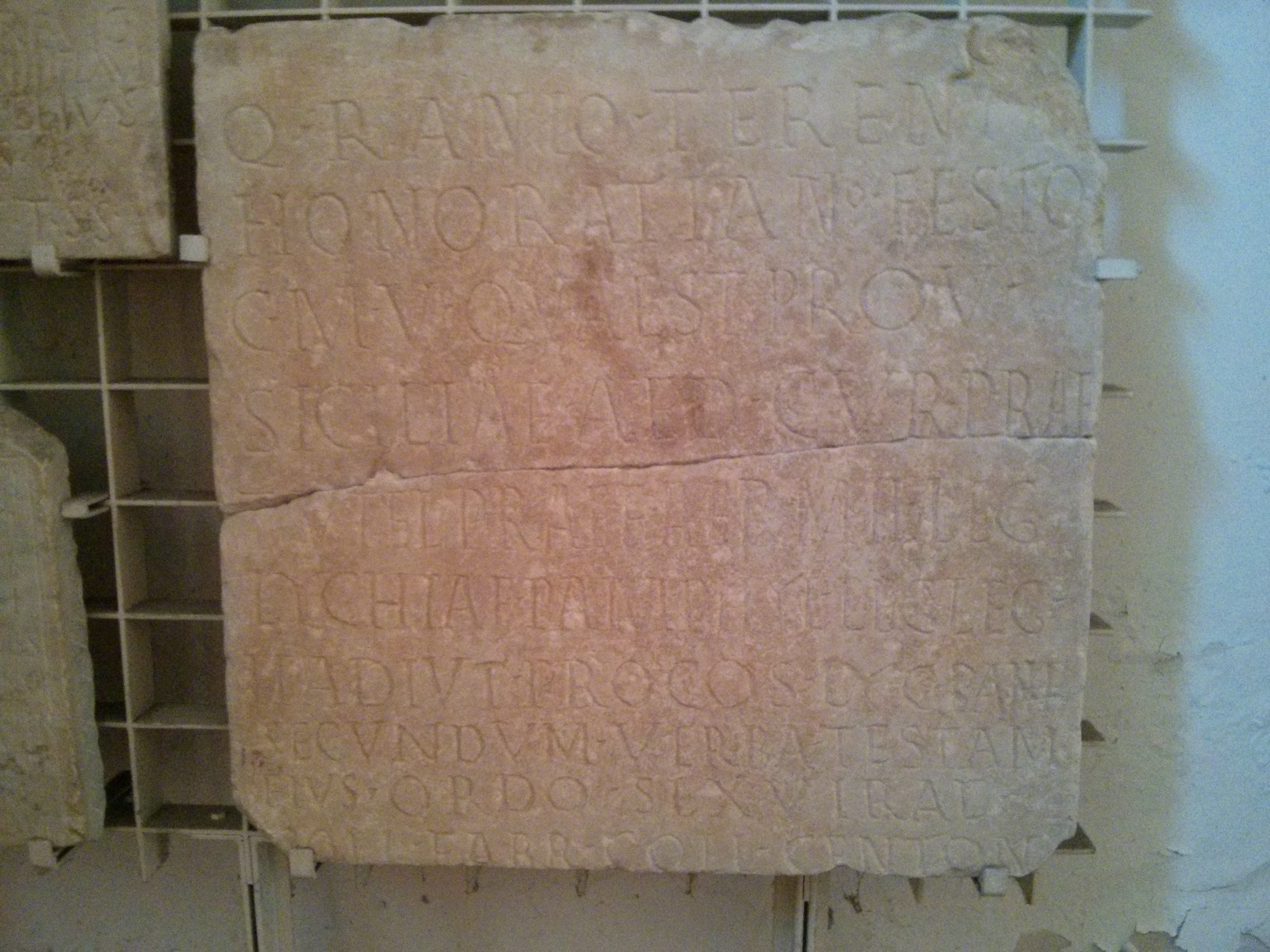
Inscription of Quintus Ranius Terentius Honoratianus Festus, CIL XI, 6164.

The gens Rania was an obscure plebeian family at ancient Rome. Few members of this gens occur in history, but others are known from inscriptions. Lucius Ranius Optatus was consul in the early third century AD.

== Origin ==
The nomen Ranius resembles other gentilicia formed using the suffix -anius, typically derived from place names and cognomina ending in -anus. No corresponding location or surname is known, but the root of the nomen resembles rana, a frog, and as a cognomen could have belonged to a common class of surnames derived from the names of familiar animals and objects.

The Ranii may have been of Sabine extraction, as one of the Ranii bore the surname Sabinus, typically indicating Sabine ancestry, while another family of the name lived at Alba Fucens, in Sabinum. Chase lists Ronius among various gentilicia of Oscan derivation, but this may be a typo for Ranius, as only a single Ronius is known from inscriptions. (Note: A Ronius Turpio, who perished aged sixty-one, and was buried at Terventum in Samnium.)

== Praenomina ==
The main praenomina of the Ranii were Lucius, Gaius, and Quintus, three of the most common names throughout Roman history. Examples of Aulus and Titus are also known.

== Branches and cognomina ==
The Ranii used a number of surnames, including Felix, fortunate or happy, Fronto, originally applied to someone with a prominent forehead, Pullo, blackish, Sabinus, a Sabine, and Optatus, desired or welcome, the only surname known to have been passed down through a distinct family of the Ranii.

== Members ==
This list includes abbreviated praenomina. For an explanation of this practice, see filiation.

- Ranius, said to have been mentioned by Cicero, perhaps as a slave or freedman of Marcus Junius Brutus; but the text cannot be located, and may perhaps be an error or variant in some manuscript.
- Lucius Ranius Felix, flamen of Augustus at Zama Regia in Africa Proconsularis during the reign of Hadrian.
- Ranius, named in an inscription from Rome.
- Gaius Ranius, a soldier in the century of Gaius Valerius Primus, stationed at Mainz#Roman Mogontiacum in Germania Superior.
- Titus Ranius Fronto, a soldier in the praetorian guard, stationed at Ravenna, was buried at Eleusis in Achaia, aged twenty-six, having served for eight years. His heirs, Mercasius and Justus, built a monument to his memory.
- Aulus Ranius Pullo, together with his wife, Avidia Successa, buried their son, Avidius Felix, at Alba Fucens in Sabinum, aged thirteen years, six months, and eight days.
- Gaius Ranius Sabinus, governor of Hispania Tarraconensis, named in an inscription from Legio.
- Lucius Ranius, a priest at Mascula in Numidia.
- Lucius Ranius Se[...], a senator, and consul designatus in an uncertain year.
- Quintus Ranius Cassianus, a military tribune with the third legion at Lambaesis in Numidia, named in a libationary inscription dating between AD 209 and 211.
- Lucius Ranius Optatus, perhaps surnamed Acontius or Acontianus, was consul suffectus in an uncertain year, probably during the reign of Severus Alexander. He had previously served as one of the decemviri stlitibus judicandis, was quaestor in Sicily, tribune of the plebs, praetor, and at some point was proconsul of Gallia Narbonensis.
- Quintus Ranius Terentius Honoratianus Festus, served at various times as quaestor in Sicily, curule aedile, praetor, prefect of the military treasury, legate of the second legion, and proconsul of Lycia and Pamphylia, during the early or middle third century.
- Rania Flavia Juliana Optata, wife of the senator Flavius Pollio of Ammaedara in Africa Proconsularis, was the mother of Flavianus, Optata, and Flavianilla.
- Ranius, brother of Ranius Modare, buried at Numerus Syrorum in Mauretania Caesariensis, aged about thirty-five.
- Ranius Modare, dedicated a monument at Numerus Syrorum to his brother, Ranius.

== See also ==
- List of Roman gentes

== Bibliography ==
- Marcus Tullius Cicero, Epistulae ad Atticum.
- Dictionary of Greek and Roman Biography and Mythology, William Smith, ed., Little, Brown and Company, Boston (1849).
- Theodor Mommsen et alii, Corpus Inscriptionum Latinarum (The Body of Latin Inscriptions, abbreviated CIL), Berlin-Brandenburgische Akademie der Wissenschaften (1853–present).
- René Cagnat et alii, L'Année épigraphique (The Year in Epigraphy, abbreviated AE), Presses Universitaires de France (1888–present).
- George Davis Chase, "The Origin of Roman Praenomina", in Harvard Studies in Classical Philology, vol. VIII, pp. 103–184 (1897).
- Paul von Rohden, Elimar Klebs, & Hermann Dessau, Prosopographia Imperii Romani (The Prosopography of the Roman Empire, abbreviated PIR), Berlin (1898).
- Alberto Galieti, Contributi alla storia della diocesi suburbicaria di Albano Laziale (Contributions to the History of the Suburbicarian Diocese of Albano Laziale, abbreviated AlbLaz), Vatican City (1948).
- Marcel Le Glay, Saturne Africain, Paris (1966).
- John C. Traupman, The New College Latin & English Dictionary, Bantam Books, New York (1995).
