= Ethmia hainanensis =

Scientific classification
- Kingdom: Animalia
- Phylum: Arthropoda
- Clade: Pancrustacea
- Class: Insecta
- Order: Lepidoptera
- Family: Depressariidae
- Genus: Ethmia
- Species: E. hainanensis

Binomial name
- Ethmia hainanensis Y.-Q. Liu, 1980

Species of moth

Ethmia hainanensis is a moth in the family Depressariidae. It was described by You-Qiao Liu in 1980. It is found in Guangdong, China.
