= Ethmia acontias =

Scientific classification
- Kingdom: Animalia
- Phylum: Arthropoda
- Class: Insecta
- Order: Lepidoptera
- Family: Depressariidae
- Genus: Ethmia
- Species: E. acontias

Binomial name
- Ethmia acontias Meyrick, 1906

Species of moth

Ethmia acontias is a moth in the family Depressariidae. It was described by Edward Meyrick in 1906. It is found in Sri Lanka and southern India.

The wingspan is 17–21 mm (0.67–0.83 in). The forewings are pale whitish fuscous with blackish markings. There is a streak from the base of the costa to beneath the costa at two-fifths, brown towards its middle. There is an irregular streak along the fold from the base to near the middle, beyond the apex of which lies a dot surrounded with whitish. There is also a median longitudinal streak from before the middle to the termen beneath the apex, its posterior extremity bifurcate. There is a series of irregular dots along the posterior part of the costa and termen. The hindwings are fuscous whitish, suffused with fuscous towards the apex.
