= Georg Sabinus =

Poet, Diplomat, and Academic

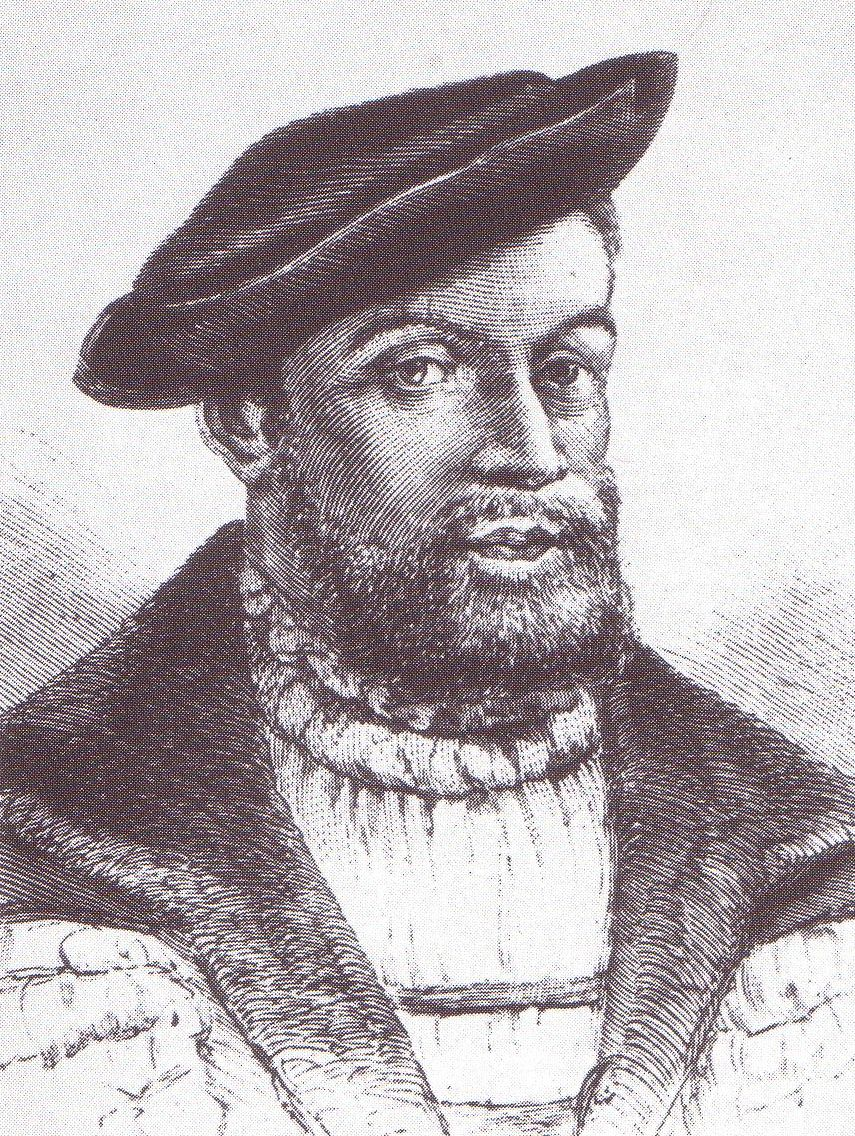
Georg Sabinus

Georg Sabinus or Georg Schuler (23 April 1508 – 2 December 1560) was a poet, diplomat and academic for the Holy Roman Empire.

Sabinus was born at Brandenburg an der Havel. He served as Professor of Poetry and Eloquence and first-ever rector of the Albertina (later the University of Königsberg). He died, aged 52, in Frankfurt (Oder).
