= List of moths of Australia =

Australian biota list

Australian moths represent between 20,000 and 30,000 different types of moths. In comparison, there are only 400 species of Australian butterflies. The moths (mostly nocturnal) and butterflies (mostly diurnal) together make up the taxonomic order Lepidoptera. Scientifically, these moths are organised into about 80 families, but the status of some is controversial and several recent changes have been suggested.

This is a list of moth species which have been recorded in Australia. The list covers the continent of Australia and Tasmania and includes islands close to the mainland.

This page provides a link to detailed lists of these moths by family. If a family is endemic to Australia, the link redirects to a description of the family itself.

== Families ==
- Adelidae
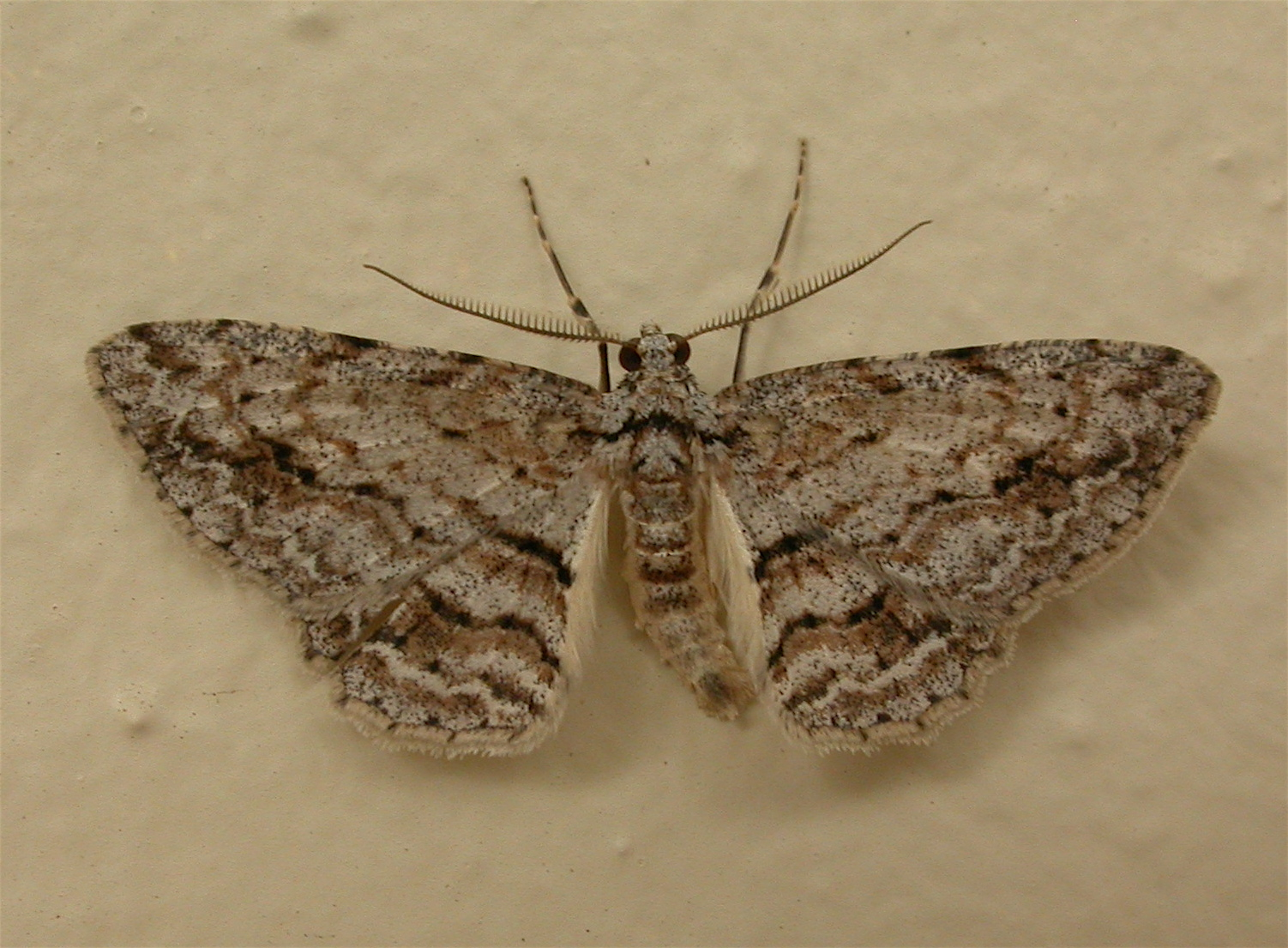
  Didymoctenia exsuperata
- Agathiphagidae
  - Only one Australian species is known: Agathiphaga queenslandensis Dumbleton, 1952
- Agonoxenidae
  - Only one Australian species is known: Agonoxena phoenicia Bradley, 1966
- Alucitidae
- Anomosetidae
  - Anomoses hylecoetes
- Anthelidae
- Arctiidae
- Argyresthiidae (mostly treated as a subfamily of Yponomeutidae)
  - Only one Australian species is known: Argyresthia notoleuca (Turner, 1913)
- Arrhenophanidae
  - Only one Australian species is known: Notiophanes fuscata Davis and Edwards, 2003
- Batrachedridae
- Blastobasidae
- Blastodacnidae (sometimes included in Agonoxenidae)
- Bombycidae
  - Only three Australian species are known: Bombyx mori (Linnaeus, 1758), Gastridiota adoxima (Turner, 1902) and an unnamed Elachyophthalma species.
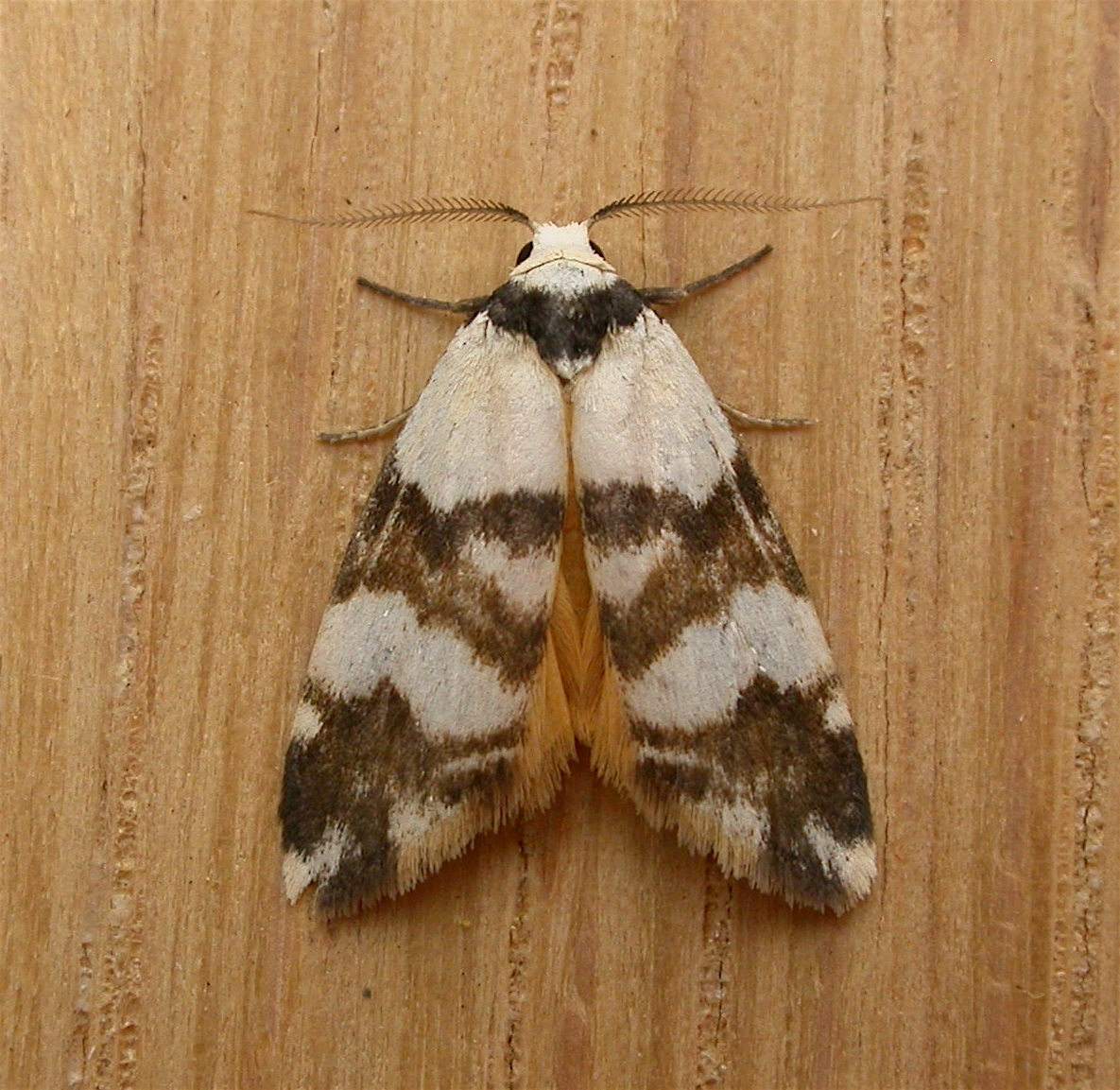
    Thallarcha albicollis
- Brachodidae
- Bucculatricidae
- Carposinidae
- Carthaeidae
  - Carthaea saturnioides
- Castniidae
- Choreutidae
- Coleophoridae
- Copromorphidae
- Cosmopterigidae
- Cossidae
- Cyclotornidae
- Depressariidae (mostly considered a subfamily of Oecophoridae)
- Drepanidae
- Douglasiidae
  - Only one Australian species is known: Tinagma leucanthes Meyrick, 1897
- Dudgeoneidae
- Elachistidae
- Epermeniidae
- Epipyropidae
- Erebidae
- Eriocottidae
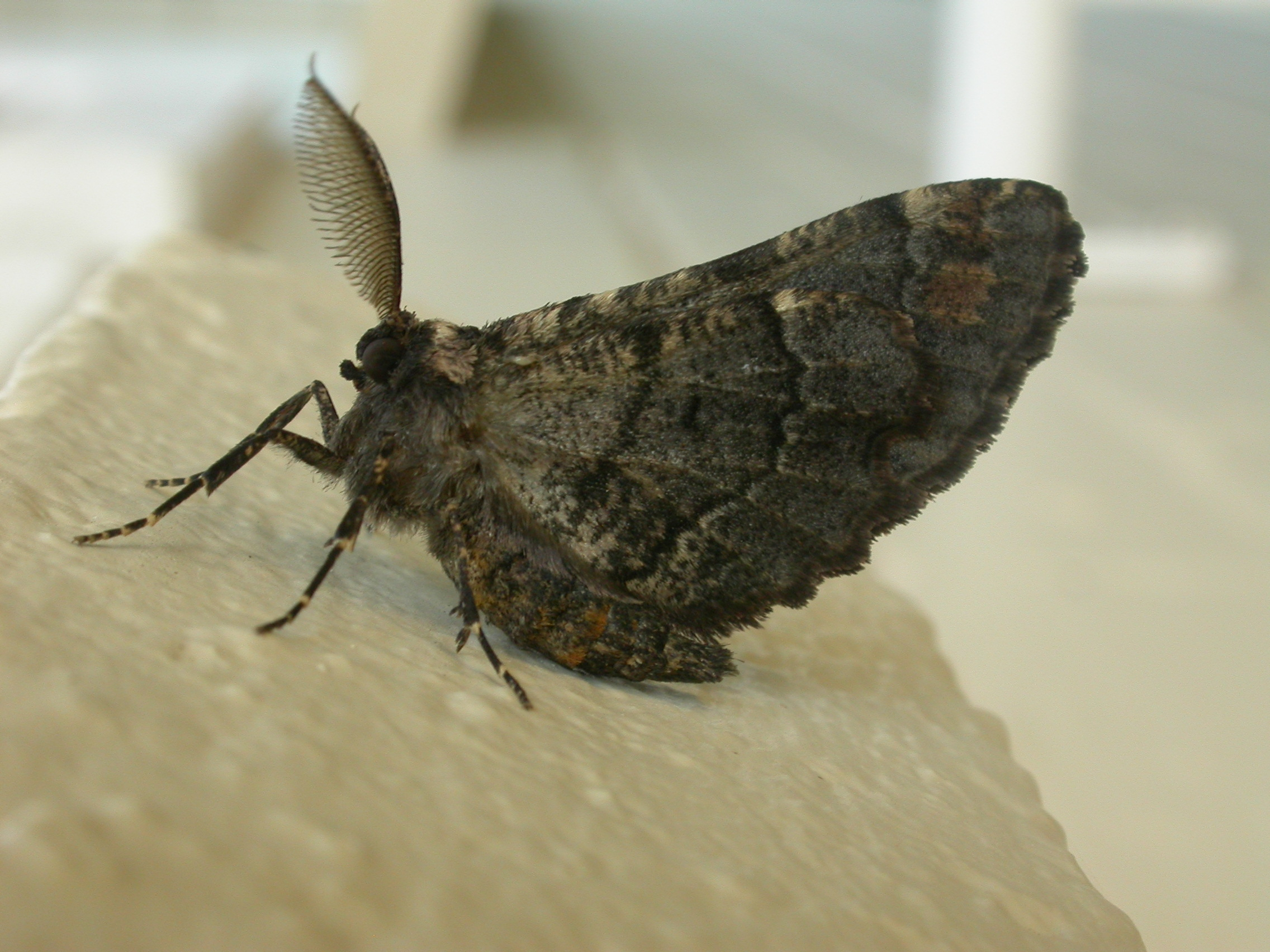
  Pholodes sinistraria
  - Only one Australian species is known: Eucryptogona trichobathra Lower, 1901
- Ethmiidae
- Eupterotidae
- Galacticidae
- Gelechiidae
- Geometridae
- Glyphipterigidae
- Gracillariidae
- Heliocosma group
- Heliodinidae
- Heliozelidae
- Hepialidae
- Herminiidae (mostly considered a subfamily of Noctuidae)
- Hyblaeidae
- Hypertrophidae (mostly considered a subfamily of Oecophoridae)
- Immidae
- Incurvariidae
- Lacturidae
- Lasiocampidae
- Lecithoceridae
- Limacodidae
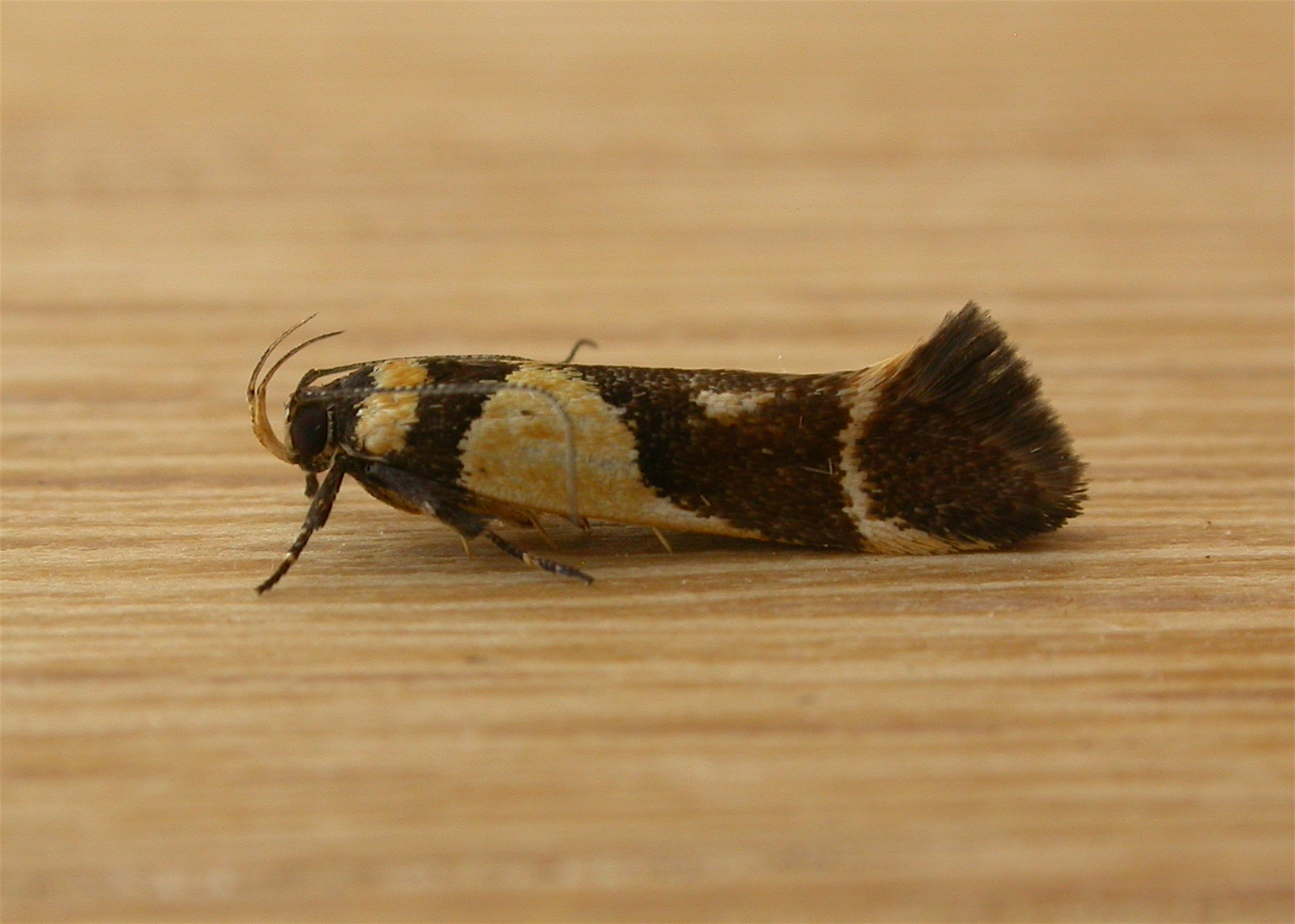
  Macrobathra chrysotoxa
- Lophocoronidae
- Lymantriidae
- Lyonetiidae
- Macropiratidae
  - Only one Australian species is known: Agdistopis halieutica (Meyrick, 1932)
- Micronoctuidae
  - Only few Australian species are known: Duplex horakae Fibiger, 2010, Duplex edwardsi Fibiger, 2010, Duplex pullata Fibiger, 2010, Duplex cockingi Fibiger, 2010 and Flax kalliesi Fibiger, 2011. Records for Tolpia conscitulana Walker, 1863 and Tolpia myops Hampson, 1907, formerly included in Noctuidae, are based on misidentifications.
- Micropterigidae
  - The following Australian species are known: Austromartyria porphyrodes (Turner, 1932), Aureopterix sterops (Turner, 1921) and the species in the genus Tasmantrix.
- Momphidae
  - Only an unnamed Zapyrastra species is known.
- Nepticulidae
- Noctuidae (including Aganaidae and Nolidae)
- Notodontidae
- Oecophoridae
- Oenosandridae
- Opostegidae
- Palaeosetidae
  - Only one Australian species is known: Palaeoses scholastica Turner, 1922.
- Palaephatidae
- Plutellidae
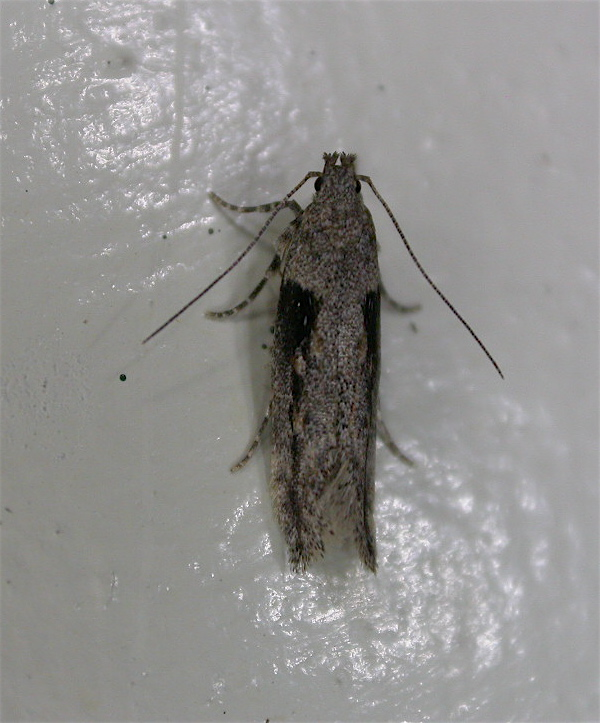
  Symmetrischema tangolias
- Psychidae
- Pterophoridae
- Pyralidae (including Crambidae)
- Roeslerstammiidae
- Saturniidae
- Scythrididae
- Sesiidae
- Simaethistidae
  - Only two Australian species are known: Metaprotus asuridia (Butler, 1886) and Metaprotus magnifica (Meyrick, 1887)
- Sphingidae
- Symmocidae
  - Only one Australian species is known: Nemotyla oribates Nielsen, McQuillan & Common, 1992
- Thyrididae
- Tineidae
- Tineodidae
- Tortricidae
- Uraniidae
- Yponomeutidae
- Zygaenidae

== See also ==
- List of butterflies of Australia

- List of butterflies of Tasmania
- List of butterflies of Victoria
