= List of moths of Australia (Oenosandridae) =

Partial list of Australian moths

This is a list of the Australian moth species of the family Oenosandridae. It also acts as an index to the species articles and forms part of the full List of moths of Australia.

- Diceratucha xenopis (Lower, 1902)
- Discophlebia blosyrodes Turner, 1903
- Discophlebia catocalina R. Felder, 1874
- Discophlebia celaena (Turner, 1903)
- Discophlebia lipauges Turner, 1917
- Discophlebia lucasii Rosenstock, 1885
- Nycteropa subovalis Turner, 1941
- Oenosandra boisduvalii Newman, 1856
