= List of moths of Australia (Ethmiidae) =

Partial list of Australian moths

This is a list of the Australian moth species of the family Ethmiidae. It also acts as an index to the species articles and forms part of the full List of moths of Australia.

The Australian fauna consists of fourteen species of the genus Ethmia, twelve of which are endemic.

- Ethmia anthracopis (Meyrick, 1902)
- Ethmia clytodoxa Turner, 1917
- Ethmia eupostica Powell, 1985
- Ethmia heliomela Lower, 1923
- Ethmia hemadelpha (Lower, 1903)
- Ethmia heptasema (Turner, 1898)
- Ethmia nigroapicella (Saalmüller, 1880)
- Ethmia postica (Zeller, 1877)
- Ethmia praeclara Meyrick, 1910
- Ethmia pseustis Turner, 1942
- Ethmia sphaerosticha (Meyrick, 1887)
- Ethmia sporadica Turner, 1942
- Ethmia thoraea Meyrick, 1910
- Ethmia virilisca Powell, 1985
