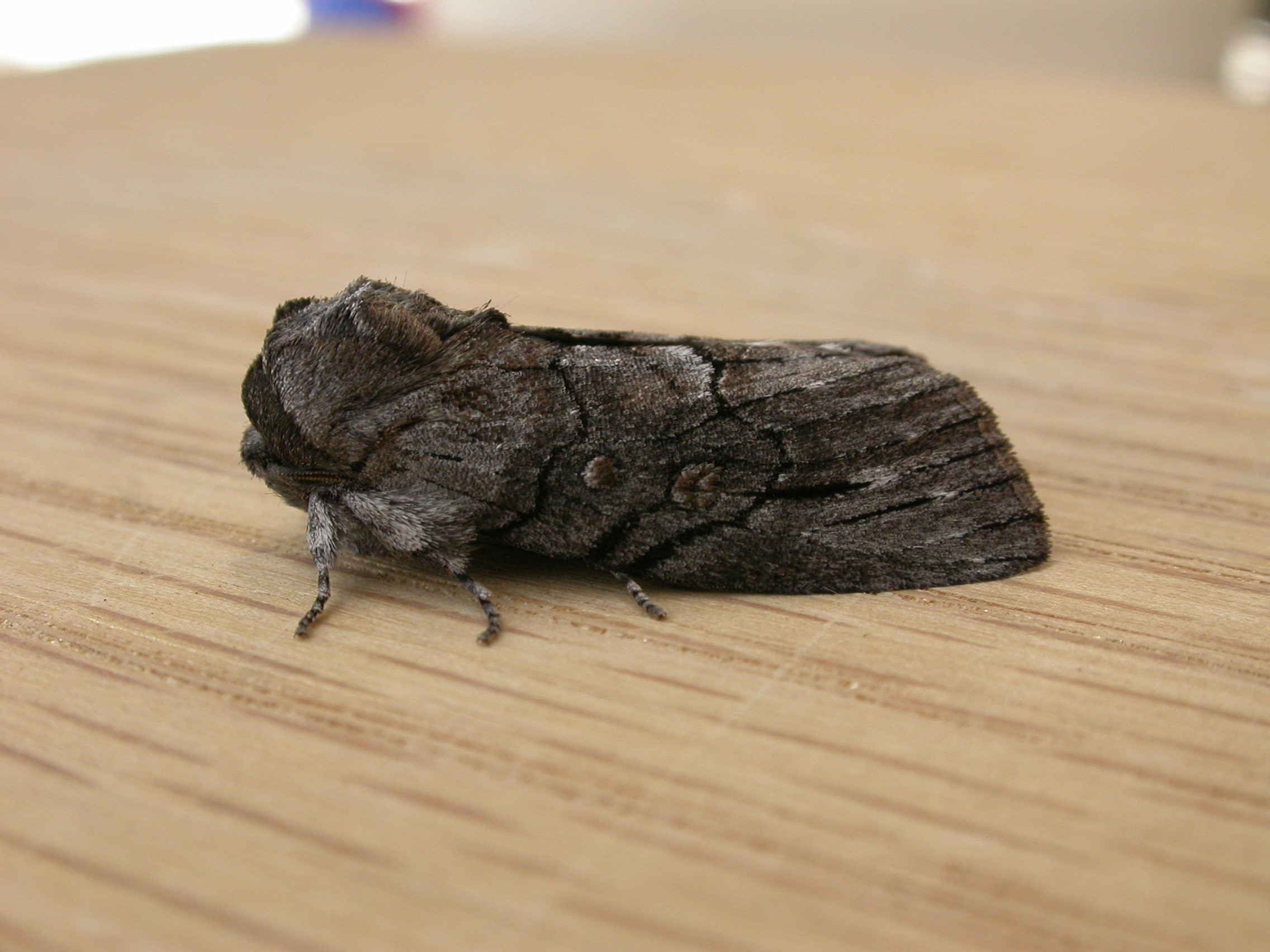

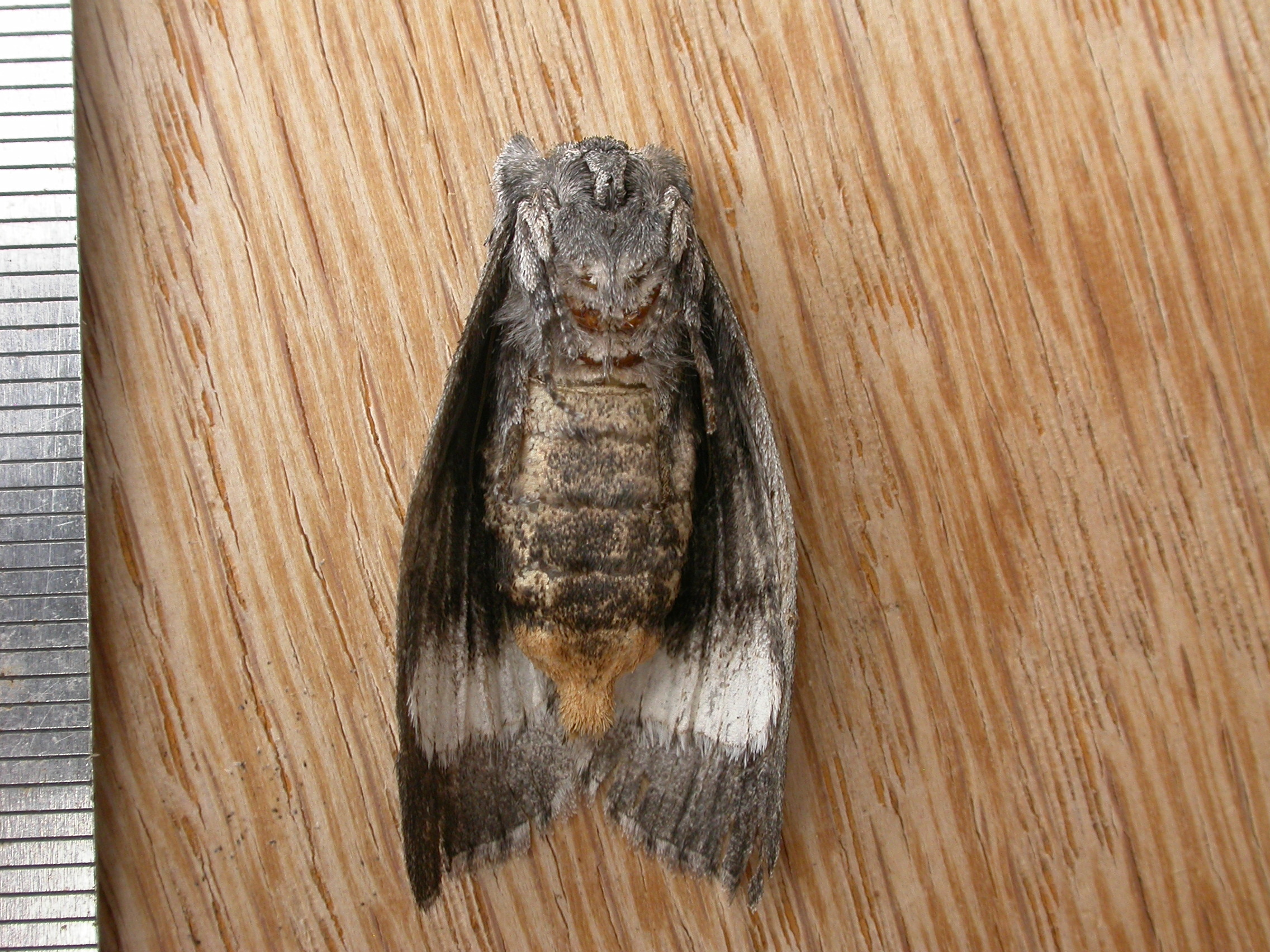

Scientific classification
- Kingdom: Animalia
- Phylum: Arthropoda
- Class: Insecta
- Order: Lepidoptera
- Superfamily: Noctuoidea
- Family: Oenosandridae
- Genus: Discophlebia
- Species: D. catocalina

Binomial name
- Discophlebia catocalina R. Felder, 1874

= Discophlebia catocalina =

Species of moth

Discophlebia catocalina, the yellow-tailed stub moth is an Australian moth species found in the south-eastern quartile of Australia. It is classified within the Oenosandridae moth family in the Noctuoidea Superfamily, the largest superfamily of the Order Lepidoptera. It is visually recognised by its characteristic pointed yellow tail and is a medium-sized moth species with a wingspan range of 40mm-60mm depending on gender. Discophlebia Catocalina have evolved to feed on various species of eucalypt.

== Distribution and habitat ==
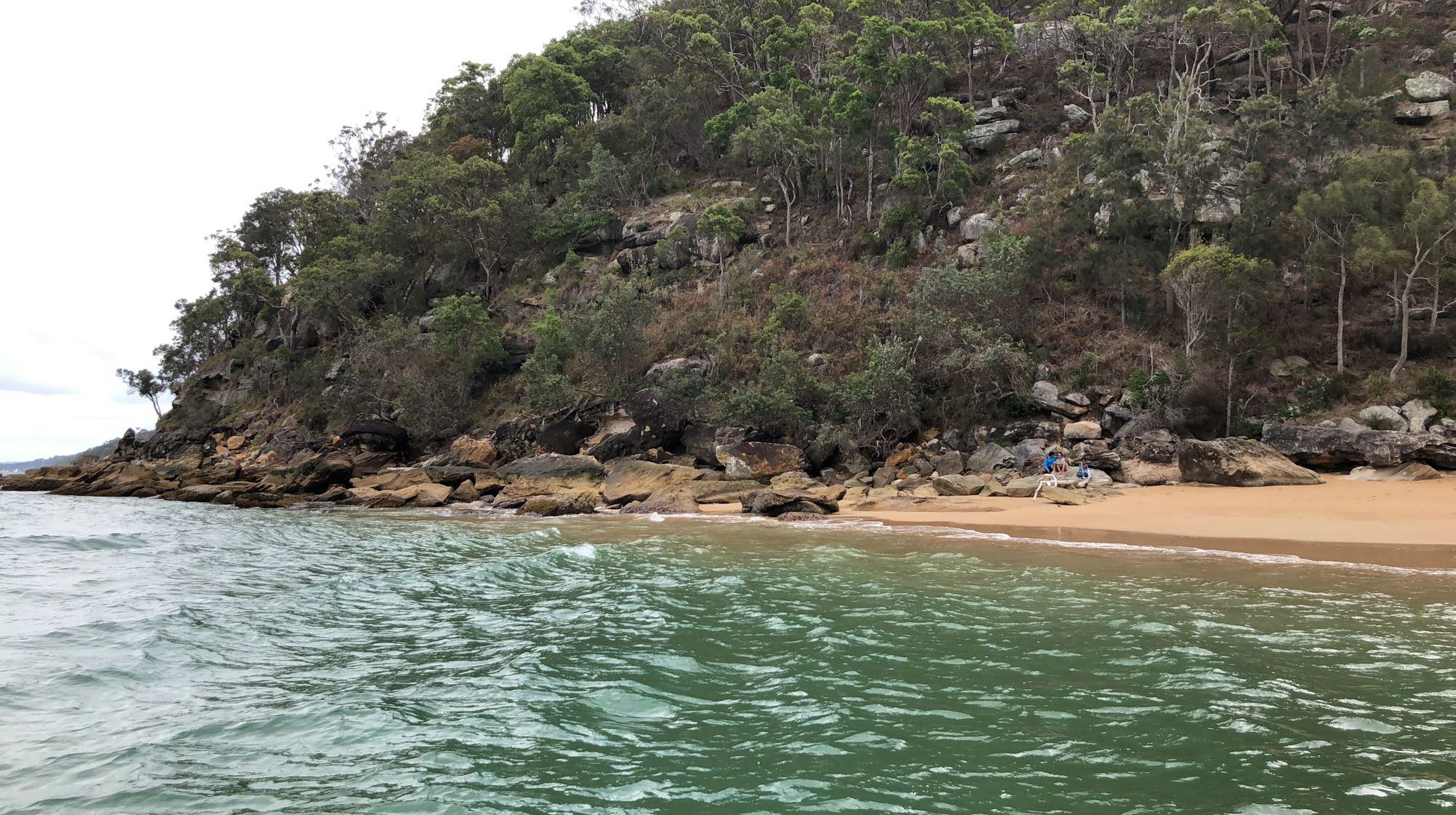
Ku-rin-gai Chase National Park.

Discophlebia Catocalina is mostly found within the south-eastern regions of Australia. Moths of the Oenosandridae family are only found in Australia. Most Genera of the Noctuoidea Superfamily are found throughout the Australasian regions, though some Noctuoidea are spread world-wide.

=== Observations: Ku-rin-gai Chase National Park ===
The Ku-rin-gai national park is a wildlife preservation park located in the North of Sydney, Australia and is a notable site for observations of Discophlebia Catocalina. This park is known for its biodiversity due to its soil fertility, allowing for a wide array of plant and insect species to inhabit. The soil mainly consists of Hawkesbury sandstone and Wianamatta and Narrabeen shale, which has high phosphorus content and allows for a richness of rainforest genera in flora and fauna to occur. It has a diversity of Eucalyptus species found in the region which Discophlebia Catocalina is known to feed on.

Early observations of Discophlebia Catocalina are recorded in 1971. Australian Entomological magazine recorded two observations that year – one in January, and in one November. They recorded only two specimens observed that year.

== Classification by Rudolf Felder (1874) ==
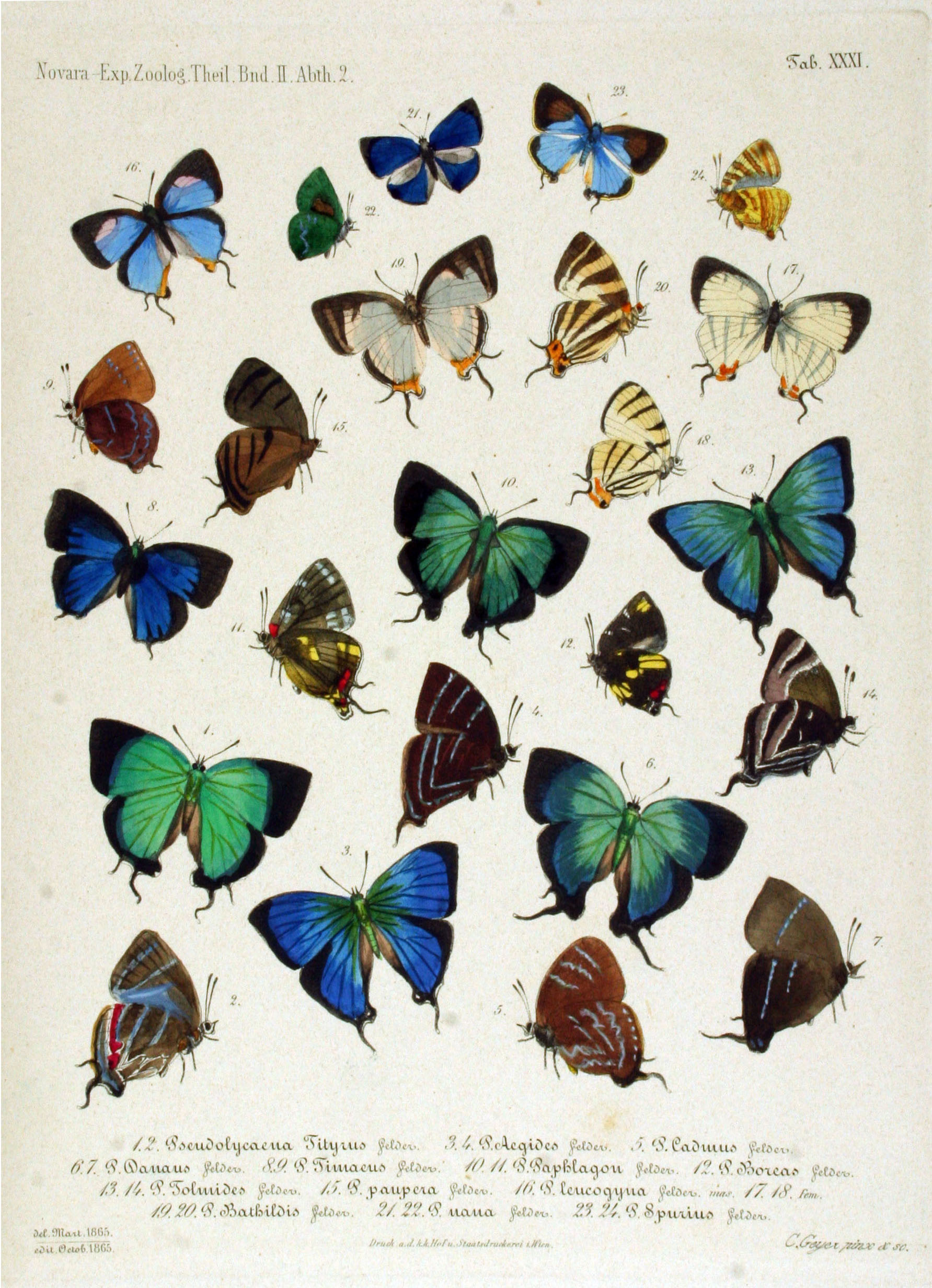
Drawing from Rudolf and Catajan's earlier publications. Taken from a publication in their 'Novara' series of Lepidoptera taxonomy.

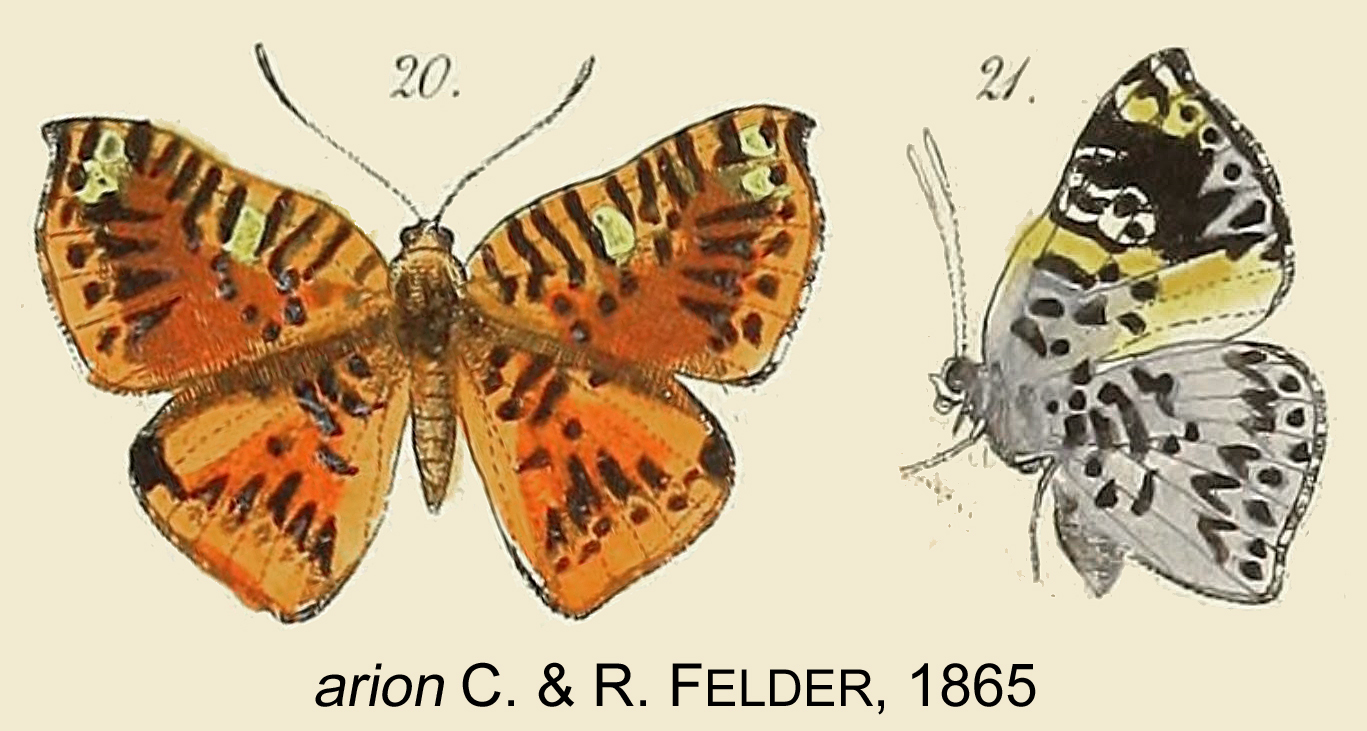
Sample of Catajan and Rudolf's Taxonomic Drawings.

Discophlebia Catocalina was originally classified by Rudolph Felder in 1874. Rudolph Felder and his father Catajan Felder were avid entomologists who held some of the largest private collections of Lepidoptera ever recorded. Some of the original type specimens they classified are deposited in The Natural History Museum (London).

Catajan Felder was a leading politician in Austria during his time in the late 1800s. He served as the mayor of Vienna during the years 1868-1878, and then served as the Palatine of Lower Austria in 1880-1884. He was the sole author of three publications on taxonomy and already owned the largest private entomological collection in central Europe prior to his collaboration with his son Rudolph.

In the early 1860s Rudolph's talent for Entomology became apparent and began his collaborative work with his father. In 1859-1867 Catajan and Rudolph published 12 publications on Lepidoptera. Rudolph's passing in 1871 delayed the completion of the pair's most detailed publication, the Lepidoptera volume of the 'Novara Cruise'.

== Superfamily Characteristics ==
The Discophlebia Catocalina belongs to the Noctuoidea superfamily. The Noctuiodea superfamily is the largest superfamily in the order of Lepidoptera. It includes the families of Arctiidae, Aganaidae (or Hysidae), Dioptidae, Herminiidae, Lymantriidae, Noctuidae, Notodontidae, Oenosandridae, Thaumetopoeidae, and Thyretidae. Moths of the superfamily in the Dioptidae and Thyretidae are the only families not native to Australia. They are classified by their thoracic hearing organs, as well as the fact that they lack a chaetosema. Ocelli can be present but chaetosema are never present in Noctuoidea.

=== Phylogenic Hypothesis for Noctuioidea ===
Phylogeny refers to the evolutionary lineage of a group of organisms and their lines of descent and relationships within each level of evolution (e.g. order, family, genera etc.). In Noctuiodea, the largest superfamily of the Lepidoptera order, there is conflicting research as to the legitimacy of certain subdivisions of families due to the question of whether there are actual genetic differences between these families to categories them as separate.

Regarding Discophlebia Catocalina, genetic research by Regier et al. (2017) supports the division of Oenosandridae moths from the Notonoidea family, and the Discophlebia genera of the Oenosandridae family. Genetic studies revealed Oenosandridae to be sisters of Notodontidae moths on 19 gene analyses though the genetic data is weakly supported. However, Oenosandridae are found to be sister to all other Noctuioids with strong support from nt123 analyses for all three nucleotide positions (single best maximum likelihood analyses).

=== Adults ===
The main apomorphic feature (distinguishing feature) of this superfamily is the metathoracic tympanal organs that the species have. In the families of Dioptidae and Ctenuchinae these organs may be smaller or exist as vestigial parts.

=== Eggs ===
The eggs of this superfamily are always of the upright type.

=== Larvae ===
The crochets of Noctuiodea larvae are always in a meso-series and uniordinal in most species but are biordinal in some.

== Family Characteristics ==
This species belongs to the Oenosandridae family. Oenosandridae are thought to be split within the Noctuiodea superfamily due to the morphology of its basal split. Oenosandridae are medium to large in size relative to other moth families. Its head and body are smooth-scaled. At rest, Oenosandridae moths hold their wings back over their body in a roof-like manner and their antennae are also held back following along the edge of its forewings. Male Oenosandridae can have simple (long and slender) or pectinate (comb-like) antennae. Oenosandridae larvae often appear with sparse hairs.

=== Ears of the Oenosandridae Moth ===
Adult moths in the Noctuoidea superfamily have evolved thoracic ears to recognise the echolocation calls of nearby predator bats. There is much debate as to how families and superfamilies in the order of Lepidoptera should be sub-classified, and recent study into differences of auditory anatomy have been proposed to discern phylogenic relationships. Studies conducted on live samples of Oenosandridae have found that males and females have similar responses to auditory stimulation, suggesting they have similar sensitivity to predator calls.

=== Separation of Classification from Notodontidae ===
Notodontidae are a family also within the Noctuidea superfamily. Previously, moths of the Oenosandridae family were classified under Notodontidae as the differentiating characteristics were difficult to spot (the thoracic organs) and required dissection of the moth to reveal the anatomical differences.

== Species Characteristics ==
=== Egg Stage ===
Discopheblia Catocalina have spherical, upright eggs that appear with a hexagonal shape on its top, and vertical ribs extending from the corners of the hexagon that run down the length of the egg. The eggs are a translucent white in colour. Eggs are laid in small groups on the leaves of its foodplants.

=== Larvae/Caterpillar Stage ===
Caterpillar of this species are black bodied with grey segments appearing as a grey dorsal line running through the centre of the body. It is sparesly covered in long white hairs. the first and last abdominal segments are a dark colour.

=== Adult Stage ===
As suggested by its colloquial name, this moth is defined by the tuft of yellow hairs extending from its tail region. Discoophlebia Catocalina is a medium-sized moth roughly 40-60mm in wingspan. Its forewings and backwings are grey and the backwings have a broad white border.

== Larvae and Adult Behaviour ==
Discophlebia Catocalina is nocturnal in larvae and adult stages. It sleeps during the day and takes flight at nighttime and is drawn to warm lights.

Discophlebia Catocalina feeds on live Eucalyptus. Studies done on captive Larvae of this species show that larvae will consume mature, drier leaves of eucalyptus including eucalyptus odorata and are purely nocturnal feeders once past the initial instar stages (stages of moulting in the process of sheding the exoskeleton on the way to reaching adult moth form). Oenosandridae larvae need to take shelter during the day and will pupate in sheltered habitats. During the day they may take refuge in bark and other crevices. At night, Oenosandridaie larvae will emerge to feed on tree foliage, often eucalypts.

Notable Instar Behaviour

The initial instar larval disposable is an important stage in this species. After the first dispersal, they will still exhibit socialising behaviours (resting closely together with other moths when taking shelter in the day) when smaller, but become solitary creatures once reaching full maturity. Adults will take flight around mid November to march, with peak periods in late December to early February.

== Male and Female Differences ==
The wingspan of the female moth is about 60mm whereas the male is approximately 40mm.

== Related Genera ==
There are 8 species which are the related genera of the Discophlebia Catocalina. These eight species are Oenosandra Boisduvalii (Newman, 1856), Nycteropa Subovalis (Turner, 1941), Discophlebia Lucassi (Rosenstock, 1885), Discophlebia Lipauges (Turner, 1917), Discophlebia Celaena (Turner, 1903), Discophlebia Catocalina (Felder, 1874), Discophlebia Blosyrodes (Turner, 1903), Diceratucha Xenopis (Lower, 1902). Brief descriptions of each species are below.

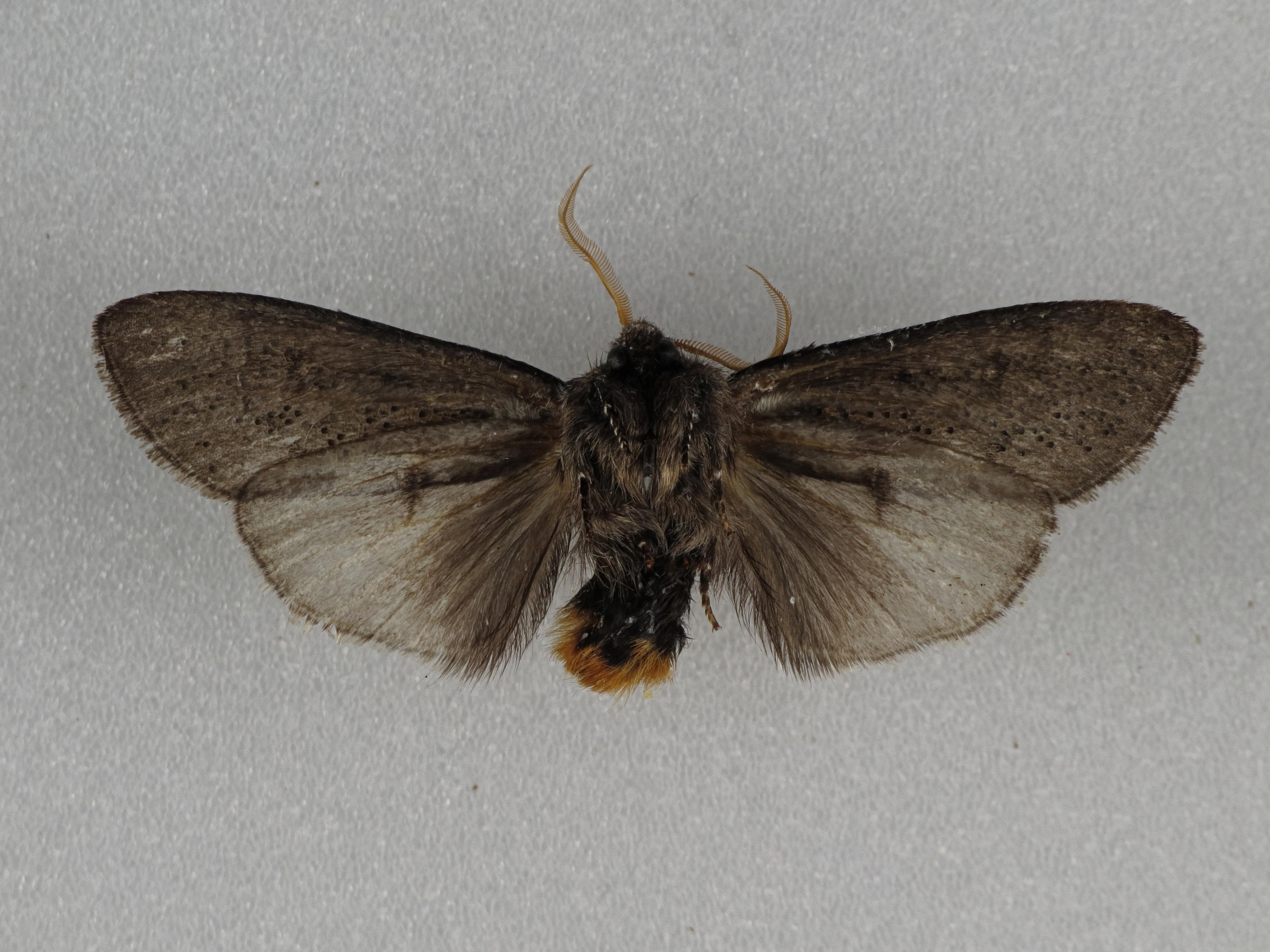
Oenosandra Boisduvalii.

=== Oenosandra Boisduvalii (Newman, 1856) ===
Oenosandra Boisduvalii is the only species in the oenosandra genus. It has a wingspan of 50mm. This species of moth appears highly differently depending on gender and were originally thought to be different species due to their dissimilar outlooks. The female moth is white (white forewings, hindwings and head) and has a thick black band running along the centre of its forewings. The female's body has alternating stripes of black and orange. The male has light brown forewings freckled with closely distributed black spots and white hindwings.

The larvae of this species appears the same for both male and female species. The caterpillar is dark grey and has few white spots on each segment of the abdomen. Its head and rear are brown, and it is sparsely covered in long white hairs.

Its behaviour is highly similar to discophlebia catocalina (journal of lepidopterists). The larvae feeding behaviours and instar socialising behaviours are the same as discophlebia catocalina. However, they have notable locomotive behaviours between their resting and feeding sites. These two sites are separate and often far apart. Oenosandra Boisduvalii show rapid movements between sites. This behaviour is similar to the North American arctiid, Hemihyalea edwaulsi Pack.

Adults fly mid-march to mid may and male moths will fly towards UV light often after 2300 hrs.

=== Nycteropa Subovalis (Turner, 1941) ===
Nycteropa Subovalis is the only species within the Nycteropa genus. It has a wingspan of roughly 40mm and has dark grey forewings and pale grey hindwings.

=== Discophlebia Lucasii (Rosenstock, 1885) ===
Discophlebia Lucasii has evolved to mimic the appearance of a branch stub where parts have broken off. This is apparent as the pale grey head of the moth appears to be a stub on a branch where the twig segment has snapped off. The wings and body of the moth are a darker greyish-brown tone. At rest, this moth physically resembles the green-faced gum hopper (Platybrachys decemmacula).

Females of this species have a wingspan of approximately 50mm, whereas males have a wingspan of roughly 40mm. This species is found all over southern regions of Australia including parts of QLD, NSW, ACT, VIC, and WA.

Original notes by Rosenstock in 1885 contain detailed descriptions of the moth's wings, uppersides and undersides. The original specimens studied by Rosenstock measured 43mm in Wingspan and 15mm in body length.

=== Discophlebia Lipauges (Turner, 1917) ===
This moth appears with brownish grey forewings and hindwings. Its forewings have darker brown curved bands cutting across the inner sections of the wing. Its hindwings are a pale, whitish colour near the body and have a darker brown band along the outer edges.

Its wingspan is roughly 50mm for male and female.

=== Discophlebia Celaena (Turner, 1903) ===
This moth appears with dark grey, patterned forewings and hindwings. Its forewings have a leopard-like pattern and are of a darker grey than its hindwings. Its hindwings have vein-like lines running from the body to the wing edges and are paler towards the body.

Its wingspan is approximately 40mm.

=== Discophlebia Blosyrodes (Turner, 1903) ===
Discophlebia Blosyrodes appears with greyish brown forewings that have variable lines and round brown patterning. It has hindwings with similar colouring and broad white bordering.

This moth has a wingspan of 40mm.

=== Diceratucha Xenopis (Lower, 1902) ===
This moth is the largest of the Oenosandridae family. Its wingspan is approximately 250mm. The forewings of this moth are a dark brown and closely speckled with black dots. Its hindwings are of a pale colour with veiny lines running from the body to the wing's edges. Both forewings and hindwings have uneven and jagged, fur-like edges.
