= List of moths of Australia (Heliocosma group) =

Partial list of Australian moths

This is a list of the Australian moth species of the Heliocosma group. It also acts as an index to the species articles and forms part of the full List of moths of Australia.

- Acmosara polyxena Meyrick, 1886
- Choristis discotypa (Turner, 1916)
- Heliocosma anthodes Meyrick, 1910
- Heliocosma argyroleuca Lower, 1916
- Heliocosma exoeca Meyrick, 1910
- Heliocosma incongruana (Walker, 1863)
- Heliocosma melanotypa Turner, 1925
- Heliocosma rhodopnoana Meyrick, 1881
- Hyperxena scierana Meyrick, 1882
