= Metaprotus =

Scientific classification
- Domain: Eukaryota
- Kingdom: Animalia
- Phylum: Arthropoda
- Class: Insecta
- Order: Lepidoptera
- Family: Crambidae
- Subfamily: Pyraustinae
- Genus: Metaprotus; Hampson, 1899

Genus of moths

Metaprotus is a genus of moths of the family Crambidae.

== Species ==
- Metaprotus asuridia Butler, 1886
- Metaprotus magnifica (Meyrick, 1887)
