= Duplex timorensis =

Scientific classification
- Kingdom: Animalia
- Phylum: Arthropoda
- Class: Insecta
- Order: Lepidoptera
- Superfamily: Noctuoidea
- Family: Erebidae
- Genus: Duplex
- Species: D. timorensis

Binomial name
- Duplex timorensis (Hampson, 1926)

Synonyms
- Anachrostis timorensis Hampson, 1926

Species of moth

Duplex timorensis is a moth of the family Erebidae first described by George Hampson in 1926. It is known from Indonesia, including Java, the Kangean Islands and south-western Timor.

The wingspan is 7–8 mm.
