= Duplex halmaherensis =

Scientific classification
- Domain: Eukaryota
- Kingdom: Animalia
- Phylum: Arthropoda
- Class: Insecta
- Order: Lepidoptera
- Superfamily: Noctuoidea
- Family: Erebidae
- Genus: Duplex
- Species: D. halmaherensis

Binomial name
- Duplex halmaherensis Fibiger, 2008

Species of moth

Duplex halmaherensis is a moth of the family Erebidae first described by Michael Fibiger in 2008. It is known from the Halmahera and Tanimbar islands of Indonesia.

The wingspan is 7.5–8 mm.
