= Aureopterix micans =

Scientific classification
- Kingdom: Animalia
- Phylum: Arthropoda
- Class: Insecta
- Order: Lepidoptera
- Family: Micropterigidae
- Genus: Aureopterix
- Species: A. micans

Binomial name
- Aureopterix micans Gibbs, 2010

Moth species in family Micropterigidae

Aureopterix micans is a moth of the family Micropterigidae. It is known from dense rainforest throughout New Caledonia from Mount Panié to the Rivière Bleue.

Adults have been found between mid-October and the end of January.

The forewing length is 2.7 millimetres (0.11 in) for males and 3.2 millimetres (0.13 in) for females.
