= List of moths of Australia (Saturniidae) =

Partial list of Australian moths

This is a list of the Australian moth species of the family Saturniidae. It also acts as an index to the species articles and forms part of the full List of moths of Australia.

- Attacus wardi Rothschild, 1910
- Coscinocera hercules (Miskin, 1876)
- Opodiphthera astrophela (Walker, 1855)
- Opodiphthera carnea (Sonthonnax, 1899)
- Opodiphthera engaea (Turner, 1922)
- Opodiphthera eucalypti (Scott, 1864)
- Opodiphthera excavus Lane, 1995
- Opodiphthera fervida Jordan, 1910
- Opodiphthera helena (White, 1843)
- Opodiphthera loranthi (T.P. Lucas, 1891)
- Opodiphthera rhythmica (Turner, 1936)
- Opodiphthera saccopoea (Turner, 1924)
- Opodiphthera sulphurea (Naumann, 2003)
- Samia cynthia (Drury, 1773)
- Syntherata janetta (White, 1843)
- Syntherata leonae (Lane, 2003)
