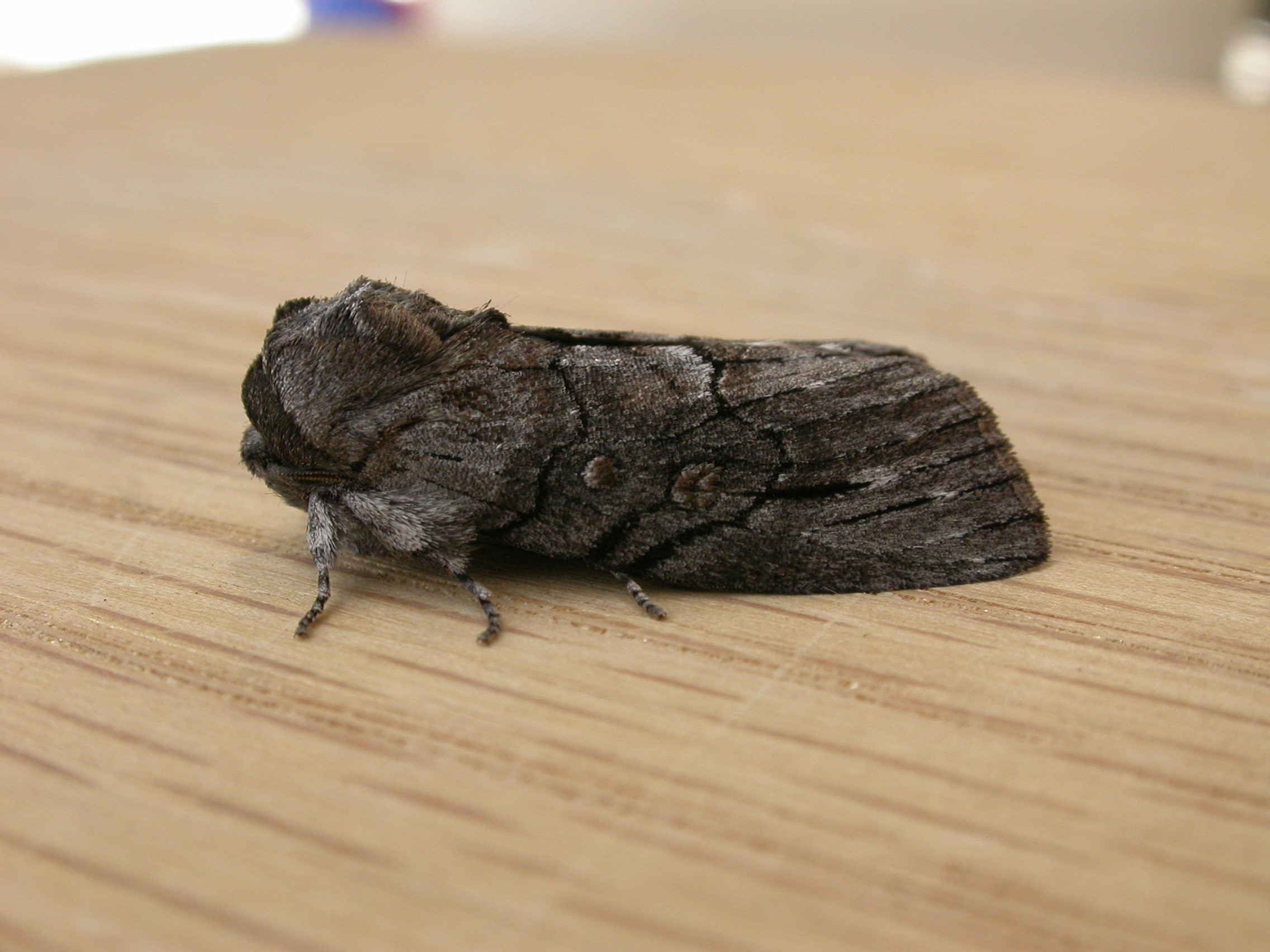
- Discophlebia catocalina

Scientific classification
- Domain: Eukaryota
- Kingdom: Animalia
- Phylum: Arthropoda
- Class: Insecta
- Order: Lepidoptera
- Superfamily: Noctuoidea
- Family: Oenosandridae
- Genus: Discophlebia; R. Felder, 1874

= Discophlebia =

Genus of moths

Discophlebia is a genus of moths of the family Oenosandridae first described by Rudolf Felder in 1874.

== Species ==
- Discophlebia blosyrodes Turner, 1903
- Discophlebia catocalina R. Felder, 1874
- Discophlebia celaena (Turner, 1903)
- Discophlebia lipauges Turner, 1917
- Discophlebia lucasii Rosenstock, 1885
