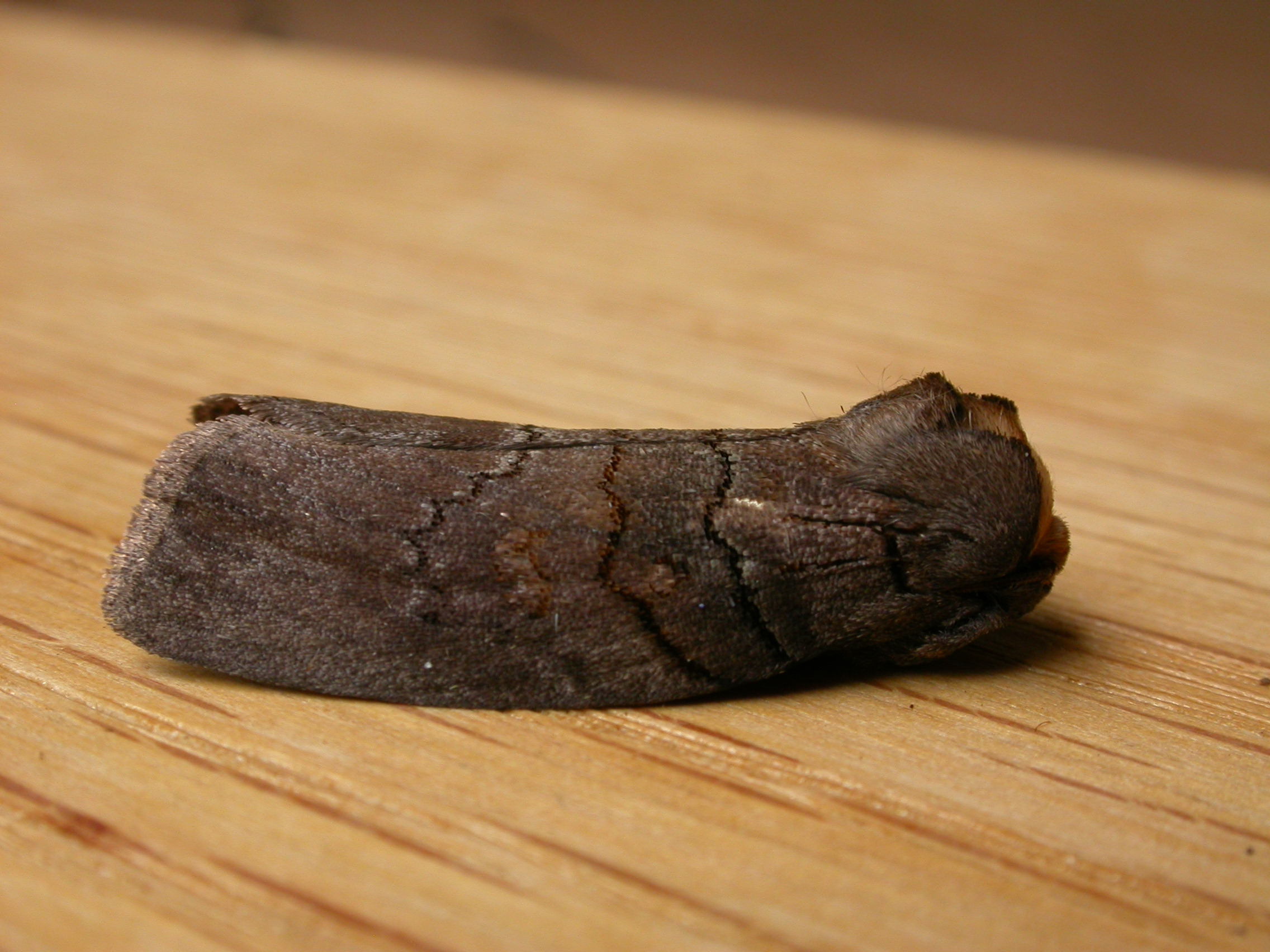

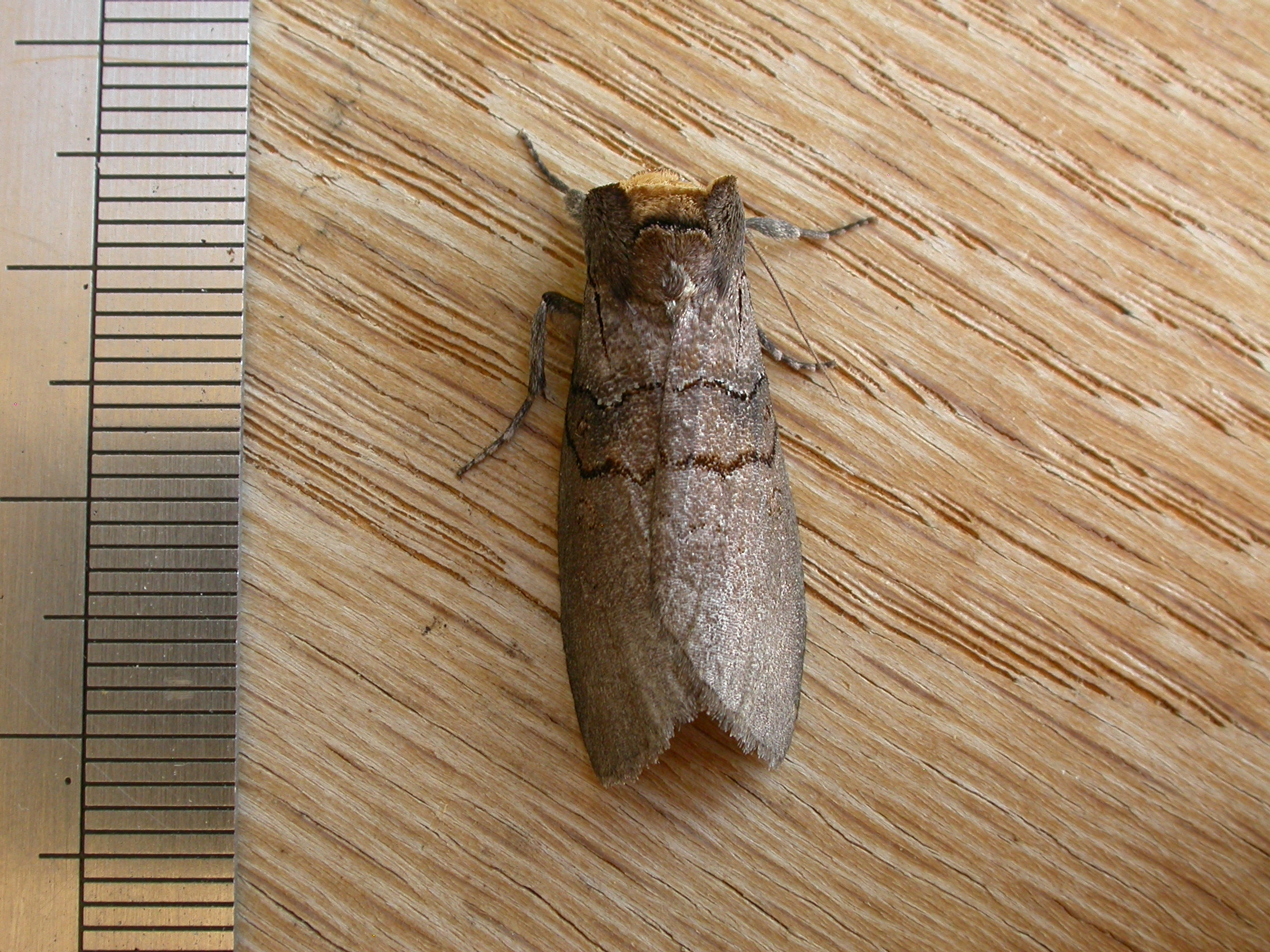

Scientific classification
- Domain: Eukaryota
- Kingdom: Animalia
- Phylum: Arthropoda
- Class: Insecta
- Order: Lepidoptera
- Superfamily: Noctuoidea
- Family: Oenosandridae
- Genus: Discophlebia
- Species: D. lucasii

Binomial name
- Discophlebia lucasii Rosenstock, 1885

= Discophlebia lucasii =

Species of moth

Discophlebia lucasii, or Lucas' stub moth, is a moth of the family Oenosandridae first described by Rudolph Rosenstock in 1885. It is found in the south-east quarter of Australia.

The wingspan is about 50 mm.
