= Duplex weintraubi =

Scientific classification
- Domain: Eukaryota
- Kingdom: Animalia
- Phylum: Arthropoda
- Class: Insecta
- Order: Lepidoptera
- Superfamily: Noctuoidea
- Family: Erebidae
- Genus: Duplex
- Species: D. weintraubi

Binomial name
- Duplex weintraubi Fibiger, 2010

Species of moth

Duplex weintraubi is a moth of the family Erebidae first described by Michael Fibiger in 2010. It is known from eastern Timor.

The wingspan is about 8 mm.
