= List of moths of Australia (Heliodinidae) =

Partial list of Australian moths

This is a list of the Australian moth species of the family Heliodinidae. It also acts as an index to the species articles and forms part of the full List of moths of Australia.

- Epicroesa ambrosia Meyrick, 1907
- Epicroesa metallifera Meyrick, 1907
- Epicroesa thiasarca Meyrick, 1907
- Heliodines princeps Meyrick, 1906
