= Duplex sumbawensis =

Scientific classification
- Domain: Eukaryota
- Kingdom: Animalia
- Phylum: Arthropoda
- Class: Insecta
- Order: Lepidoptera
- Superfamily: Noctuoidea
- Family: Erebidae
- Genus: Duplex
- Species: D. sumbawensis

Binomial name
- Duplex sumbawensis Fibiger, 2008

Species of moth

Duplex sumbawensis is a moth of the family Erebidae first described by Michael Fibiger in 2008. It is known from Sumbawa island of Indonesia.

The wingspan is about 8.5 mm.
