= List of moths of Australia (Roeslerstammiidae) =

Partial list of Australian moths

This is a list of the Australian moth species of the family Roeslerstammiidae. It also acts as an index to the species articles and forms part of the full List of moths of Australia.

- Amphithera hemerina Turner, 1923
- Amphithera heteroleuca (Turner, 1900)
- Amphithera heteromorpha Meyrick, 1893
- Chalcoteuches phlogera Turner, 1927
- Harpedonistis gonometra Meyrick, 1893
- Hestiaula rhodacris Meyrick, 1893
- Macarangela leucochrysa (Meyrick, 1893)
- Macarangela pyracma Meyrick, 1893
- Macarangela uranarcha Meyrick, 1893
- Nematobola candescens Meyrick, 1893
- Nematobola isorista Meyrick, 1893
- Nematobola orthotricha Meyrick, 1893
- Sphenograptis celetica Meyrick, 1913
- Thereutis arcana Meyrick, 1893
- Thereutis chionozyga Meyrick, 1893
- Thereutis conscia Meyrick, 1921
- Thereutis insidiosa Meyrick, 1893
- Thereutis noxia Meyrick, 1921
- Thereutis schismatica Meyrick, 1893
- Thereutis tanyceros (Turner, 1939)
- Vanicela dentigera Meyrick, 1913
- Vanicela tricolona Meyrick, 1913
- Vanicela xenadelpha Meyrick, 1889
