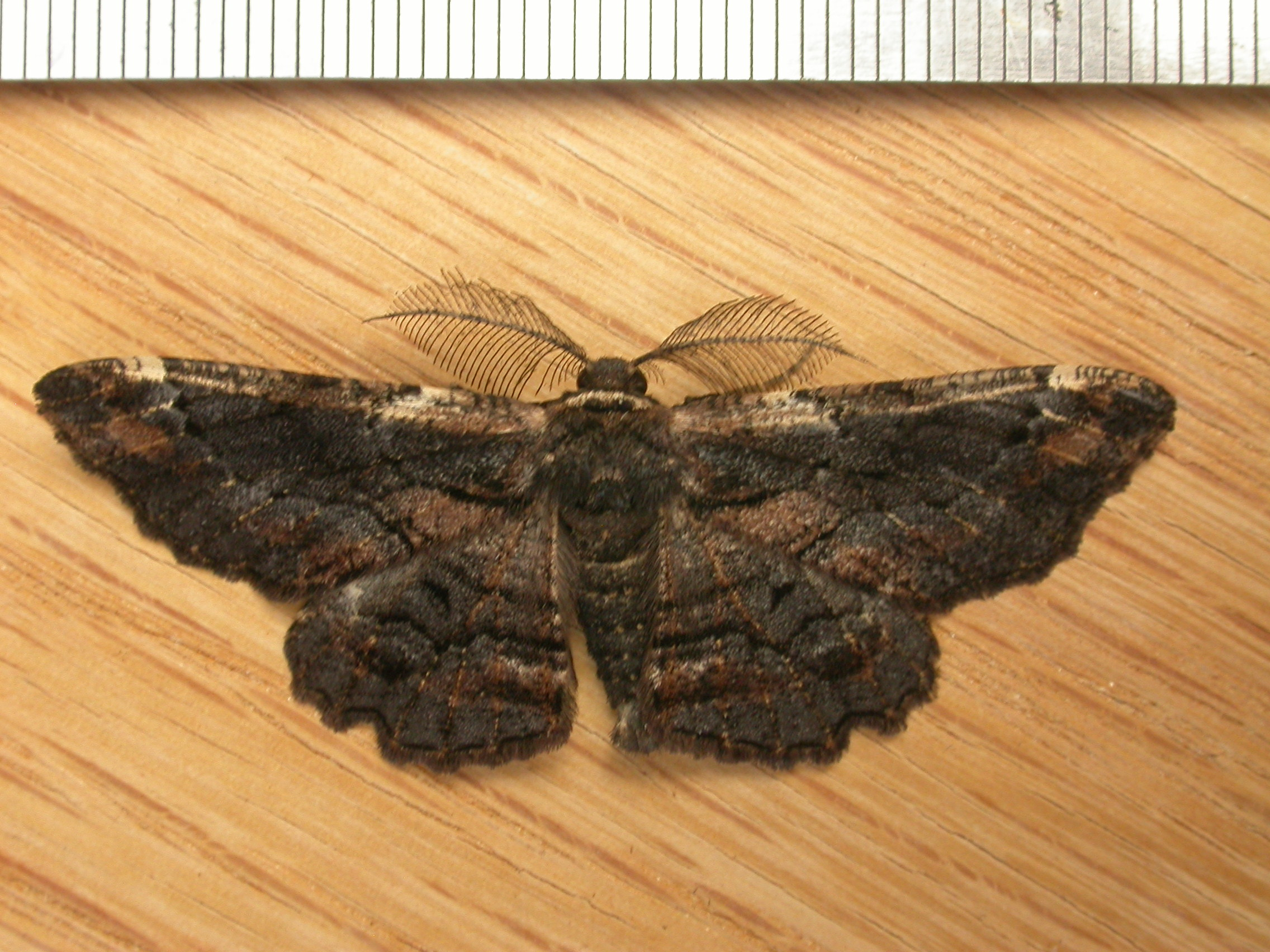
- Pholodes sinistraria

Scientific classification
- Kingdom: Animalia
- Phylum: Arthropoda
- Clade: Pancrustacea
- Class: Insecta
- Order: Lepidoptera
- Family: Geometridae
- Subfamily: Ennominae
- Genus: Pholodes; D. S. Fletcher, 1979

= Pholodes =

Genus of moths

Pholodes is a genus of moths in the family Geometridae. It was described by David Stephen Fletcher in 1979, though several species were previously known. Its junior homonym is the anagrammatic Lophodes.

== Species ==
Some species of this genus are:

- Pholodes atrifasciata (Warren, 1893)
- Pholodes australasiaria (Boisduval, 1832) (Australasia)
- Pholodes difformaria (Herrich-Schäffer, 1858)
- Pholodes fuliginea (Hampson, 1895) (India) - initially known as Scotosia fuliginea
- Pholodes indigna (Warren, 1899)
- Pholodes nigrescens (Warren, 1893) (India)
- Pholodes rufiplaga (Warren, 1899)
- Pholodes squamosa (Warren, 1896) (India)
- Pholodes sinistraria (Guenée, 1857) (Australia) - type species, initially known as Lophodes sinistraria
