= Duplex aarviki =

Scientific classification
- Domain: Eukaryota
- Kingdom: Animalia
- Phylum: Arthropoda
- Class: Insecta
- Order: Lepidoptera
- Superfamily: Noctuoidea
- Family: Erebidae
- Genus: Duplex
- Species: D. aarviki

Binomial name
- Duplex aarviki Fibiger, 2008

Species of moth

Duplex aarviki is a moth of the family Erebidae first described by Michael Fibiger in 2008. It is known from north and north-west Sumatra, southern West Malaysia and south-western Thailand.

Adults have been found in February, June and July, suggesting multiple generations per year. The habitat consists of lowland forests.

The wingspan is 7.5-9.5 mm.
