= Duplex hollowayi =

Scientific classification
- Domain: Eukaryota
- Kingdom: Animalia
- Phylum: Arthropoda
- Class: Insecta
- Order: Lepidoptera
- Superfamily: Noctuoidea
- Family: Erebidae
- Genus: Duplex
- Species: D. hollowayi

Binomial name
- Duplex hollowayi Fibiger, 2008

Species of moth

Duplex hollowayi is a moth of the family Erebidae first described by Michael Fibiger in 2008. It is known from Seram Island in Indonesia.

The wingspan is about 9 mm.
