= List of moths of Australia (Bucculatricidae) =

Partial list of Australian moths

This is a list of the Australian species of the family Bucculatricidae. It also acts as an index to the species articles and forms part of the full List of moths of Australia.

- Bucculatrix acrogramma Meyrick, 1919
- Bucculatrix asphyctella Meyrick, 1880
- Bucculatrix eucalypti Meyrick, 1880
- Bucculatrix gossypii Turner, 1926
- Bucculatrix ivella Busck, 1900
- Bucculatrix lassella Meyrick, 1880
- Bucculatrix mesoporphyra (Turner, 1933)
- Bucculatrix parthenica Bradley, 1990
- Bucculatrix perfixa Meyrick, 1915
- Bucculatrix ptochastis Meyrick, 1893
- Bucculatrix ulocarena Turner, 1923
- Bucculatrix xenaula Meyrick, 1893
- Cryphioxena notosema Meyrick, 1922
- Ogmograptis scribula Meyrick, 1935
