= Duplex septemtria =

Scientific classification
- Domain: Eukaryota
- Kingdom: Animalia
- Phylum: Arthropoda
- Class: Insecta
- Order: Lepidoptera
- Superfamily: Noctuoidea
- Family: Erebidae
- Genus: Duplex
- Species: D. septemtria

Binomial name
- Duplex septemtria Fibiger, 2008

Species of moth

Duplex septemtria is a moth of the family Erebidae first described by Michael Fibiger in 2008. It is known from Taiwan.

Adults have been found in May and July. The habitat consists of subtropical forests.

The wingspan is 7–8 mm.
