= Austromartyria =

Scientific classification
- Domain: Eukaryota
- Kingdom: Animalia
- Phylum: Arthropoda
- Class: Insecta
- Order: Lepidoptera
- Family: Micropterigidae
- Genus: Austromartyria; Gibbs, 2010

Species
- see text.

Monotypic genus of moths in family Micropterigidae

Austromartyria is a genus of small primitive metallic moths in the family Micropterigidae, with a single species.

== Species ==
- Austromartyria porphyrodes (Turner, 1932)
