= Duplex (moth) =

Scientific classification
- Domain: Eukaryota
- Kingdom: Animalia
- Phylum: Arthropoda
- Class: Insecta
- Order: Lepidoptera
- Superfamily: Noctuoidea
- Family: Erebidae
- Subtribe: Parachrostiina
- Genus: Duplex; Fibiger, 2008

Genus of moths

Duplex is a genus of moths of the family Erebidae erected by Michael Fibiger in 2008.

== Species ==
- Duplex septemtria Fibiger, 2008
- Duplex aarviki Fibiger, 2008
- Duplex timorensis (Hampson, 1926)
- Duplex hollowayi Fibiger, 2008
- Duplex halmaherensis Fibiger, 2008
- Duplex sumbawensis Fibiger, 2008
- Duplex weintraubi Fibiger, 2010
- Duplex horakae Fibiger, 2010
- Duplex edwardsi Fibiger, 2010
- Duplex pullata Fibiger, 2010
- Duplex cockingi Fibiger, 2010
