= List of moths of Australia (Uraniidae) =

Partial list of Australian moths

This is a list of the Australian moth species of the family Uraniidae. It also acts as an index to the species articles and forms part of the full List of moths of Australia.

== Epipleminae ==
- Balantiucha cyclocrossa Turner, 1926
- Balantiucha decorata (Warren, 1898)
- Balantiucha leucocephala (Walker, 1863)
- Balantiucha mutans (Butler, 1887)
- Balantiucha seminigra (Warren, 1896)
- Balantiucha stolida (Butler, 1886)
- Cathetus euthysticha (Turner, 1911)
- Chundana lugubris Walker, 1862
- Dirades lugens (Warren, 1897)
- Dysaethria pasteopa Turner, 1911
- Dysrhombia longipennis Warren, 1896
- Epiplema angulata Warren, 1896
- Epiplema argillodes Turner, 1903
- Epiplema coeruleotincta Warren, 1896
- Epiplema conflictaria (Walker, 1861)
- Epiplema desistaria (Walker, 1861)
- Epiplema leucosema Turner, 1911
- Epiplema quadristrigata (Walker, 1866)
- Epiplema stereogramma (Turner, 1903)
- Epiplema thiocosma Turner, 1911
- Lobogethes interrupta Warren, 1896
- Monobolodes subfalcata Warren, 1898
- Rhombophylla xylinopis (Turner, 1903)

== Uraniinae ==
- Acropteris nanula (Warren, 1898)
- Acropteris teriadata (Guenée, 1857)
- Alcides metaurus (Hopffer, 1856)
- Aploschema discata (Warren, 1899)
- Cyphura geminia (Cramer, 1777)
- Lyssa macleayi (Montrouzier, 1856)
- Stesichora quadripunctata Warren, 1896
- Strophidia directaria (Walker, 1866)
- Urapteroides astheniata (Guenée, 1857)
