= Ethmia hemadelpha =

Scientific classification
- Domain: Eukaryota
- Kingdom: Animalia
- Phylum: Arthropoda
- Class: Insecta
- Order: Lepidoptera
- Family: Depressariidae
- Genus: Ethmia
- Species: E. hemadelpha

Binomial name
- Ethmia hemadelpha (Lower, 1903)

Synonyms
- Psecadia hemadelpha Lower, 1903

Species of moth

Ethmia hemadelpha is a moth in the family Depressariidae. It is found in north-western Australia.

The larvae feed on Ehretia saligna.
