= Ethmia thoraea =

Scientific classification
- Kingdom: Animalia
- Phylum: Arthropoda
- Class: Insecta
- Order: Lepidoptera
- Family: Depressariidae
- Genus: Ethmia
- Species: E. thoraea

Binomial name
- Ethmia thoraea Meyrick, 1910

Species of moth

Ethmia thoraea is a moth belonging to the family Depressariidae. It is found in Australia, ranging from the north coast of Queensland to coastal New South Wales, with inland populations at Cunnamulla in Queensland, and Mount Kaputar in New South Wales.

The forewings are grey with black spots.

The larvae possibly feed on Cynoglossum australe.
