= Ethmia heptasema =

Scientific classification
- Domain: Eukaryota
- Kingdom: Animalia
- Phylum: Arthropoda
- Class: Insecta
- Order: Lepidoptera
- Family: Depressariidae
- Genus: Ethmia
- Species: E. heptasema

Binomial name
- Ethmia heptasema (Turner, 1898)

Synonyms
- Psecadia heptasema Turner, 1898

Species of moth

Ethmia heptasema is a moth in the family Depressariidae. It occurs in the rain forests of the coastal mountains of Australia from central Queensland to the Illawarra region of New South Wales and is possibly also present in New Guinea.

The larvae possibly feed on Ehretia acuminata.
