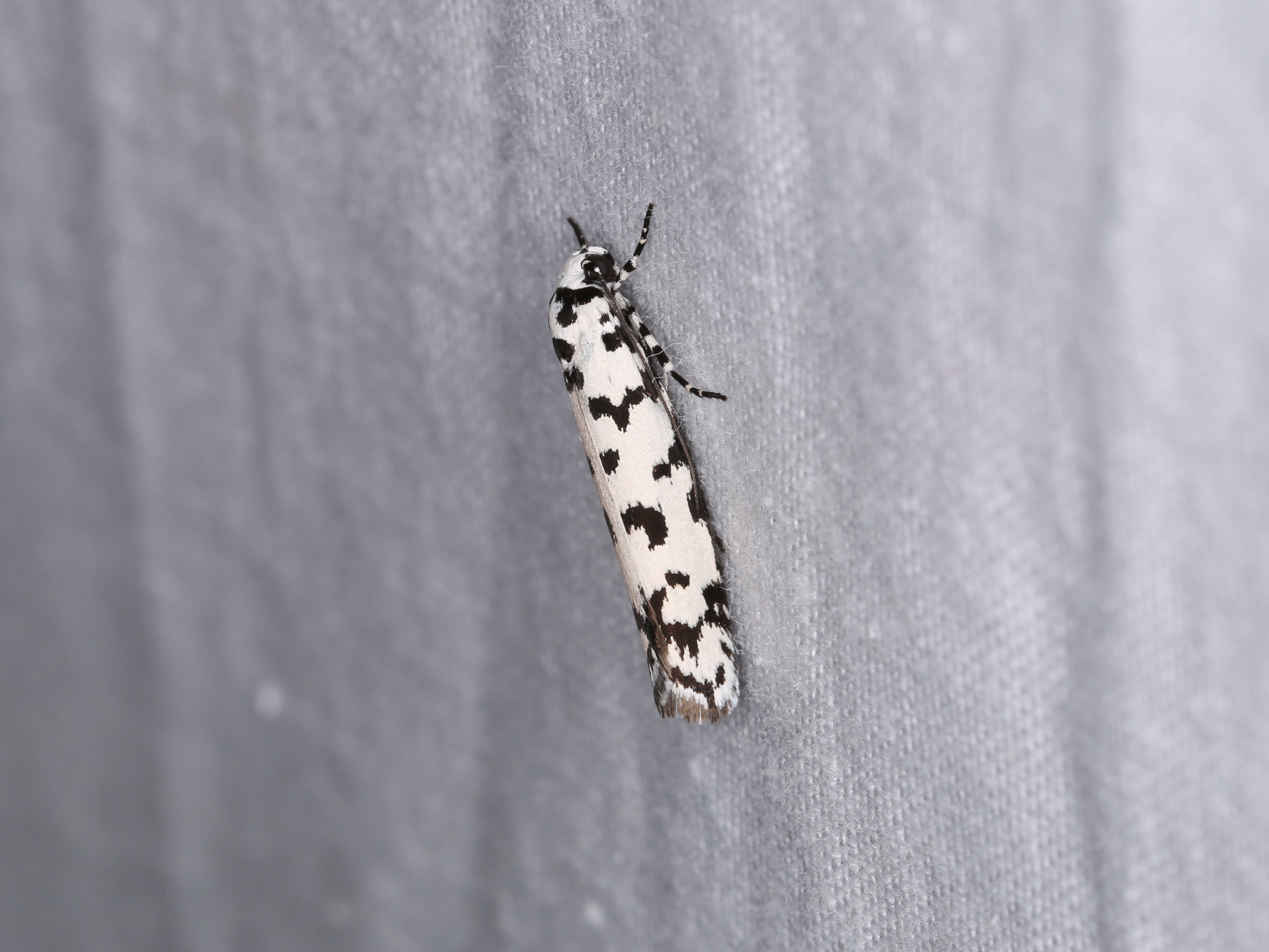

Scientific classification
- Kingdom: Animalia
- Phylum: Arthropoda
- Clade: Pancrustacea
- Class: Insecta
- Order: Lepidoptera
- Family: Depressariidae
- Genus: Ethmia
- Species: E. eupostica

Binomial name
- Ethmia eupostica Powell, 1985

= Ethmia eupostica =

Species of moth

Ethmia eupostica is a moth in the family Ethmiidae. It is widely distributed across inland Australia.
