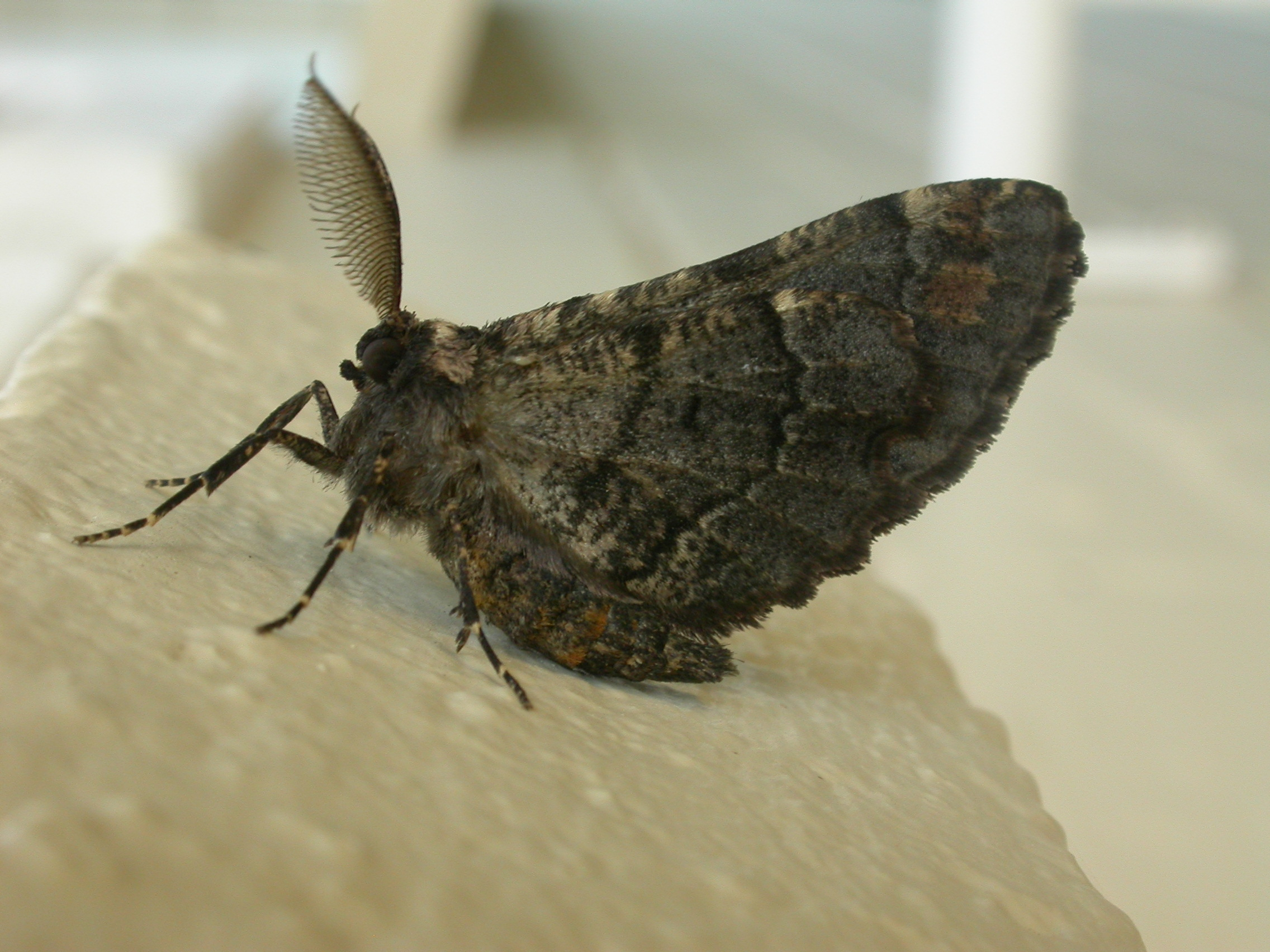

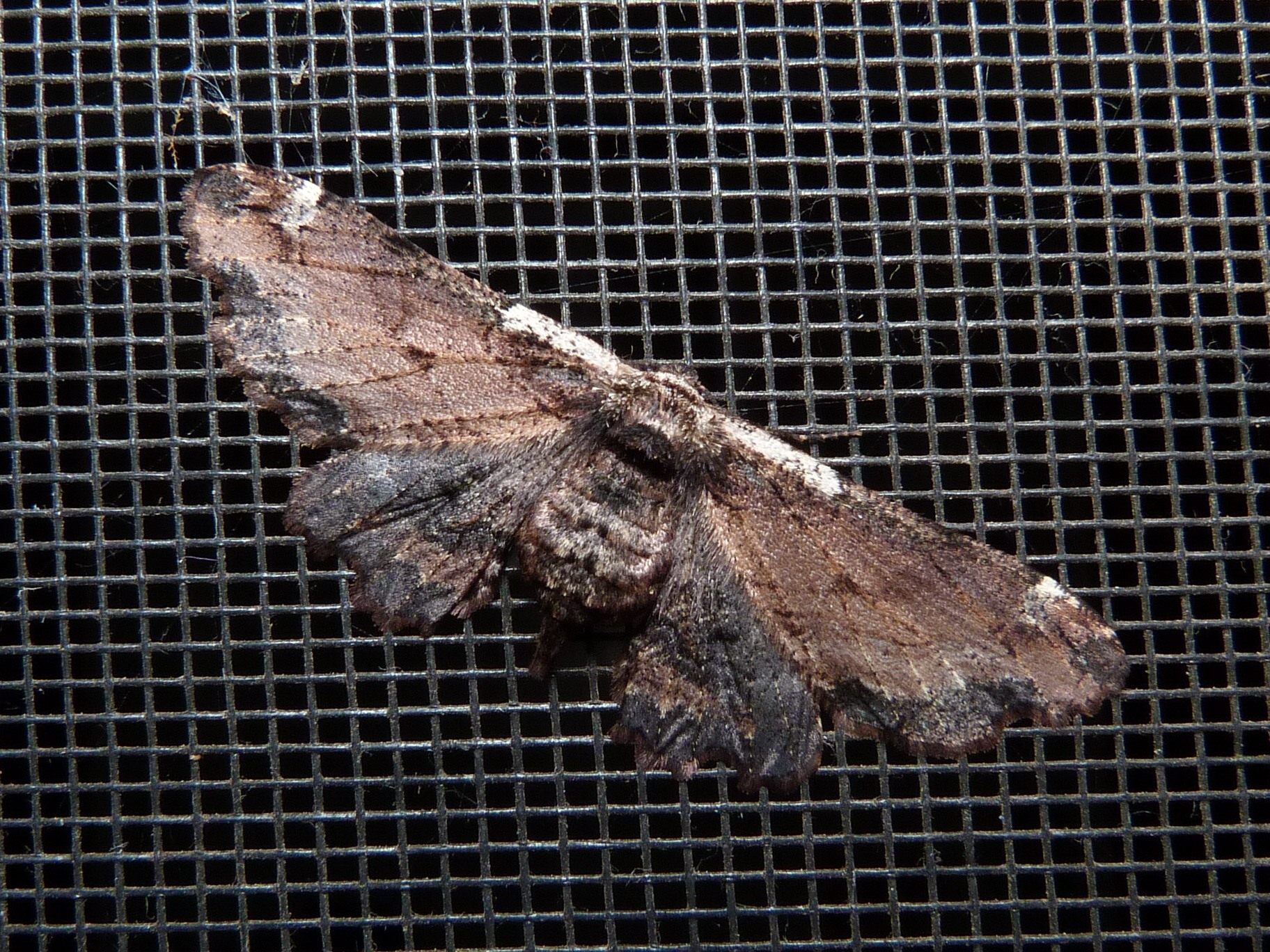

Scientific classification
- Kingdom: Animalia
- Phylum: Arthropoda
- Class: Insecta
- Order: Lepidoptera
- Family: Geometridae
- Genus: Pholodes
- Species: P. sinistraria

Binomial name
- Pholodes sinistraria Guenee, 1857

Synonyms
- Lophodes sinistraria

= Pholodes sinistraria =

Species of moth

Pholodes sinistraria, the sinister moth or frilled bark moth, is a moth of the family Geometridae. The species was first described by Achille Guenée in 1857. It is found in the eastern parts of Australia.

The wingspan is about 50 mm for males and 60 mm for females.

The larvae feed on a wide range of plants, including Rosa odorata, Camellia japonica, Persea americana, Citrus unshiu, Cassia species, Ricinus communis, Acacia species and Acmena smithii. Furthermore, it is considered a pest on Macadamia integrifolia.
