= Duplex cockingi =

Scientific classification
- Domain: Eukaryota
- Kingdom: Animalia
- Phylum: Arthropoda
- Class: Insecta
- Order: Lepidoptera
- Superfamily: Noctuoidea
- Family: Erebidae
- Genus: Duplex
- Species: D. cockingi

Binomial name
- Duplex cockingi Fibiger, 2010

Species of moth

Duplex cockingi is a moth of the family Erebidae first described by Michael Fibiger in 2010. It is known from Australia in south-western Queensland and the northern part of New South Wales.

The wingspan is 11–12 mm.
