= Ethmia praeclara =

Scientific classification
- Kingdom: Animalia
- Phylum: Arthropoda
- Class: Insecta
- Order: Lepidoptera
- Family: Depressariidae
- Genus: Ethmia
- Species: E. praeclara

Binomial name
- Ethmia praeclara Meyrick, 1910

Synonyms
- Ethmia preclara Yen, Wei & Kun, 2009

Species of moth

Ethmia praeclara is a moth in the family Depressariidae. It is found in Taiwan, the Philippines, Indonesia, New Guinea and Australia.
