= Aureopterix sterops =

Scientific classification
- Kingdom: Animalia
- Phylum: Arthropoda
- Clade: Pancrustacea
- Class: Insecta
- Order: Lepidoptera
- Family: Micropterigidae
- Genus: Aureopterix
- Species: A. sterops

Binomial name
- Aureopterix sterops (Turner, 1921)

Synonyms
- Sabatinca sterops Turner, 1921

Moth species in family Micropterigidae

Aureopterix sterops is a moth of the family Micropterigidae. It is known from eastern Australia, where it is known from northern Queensland, in wet coastal or elevated coastal forest between Mount Finnigan and Kirrama State Forest.

The forewing length is 9 millimetres (0.35 in) for males and 3.1 millimetres (0.12 in) for females.
