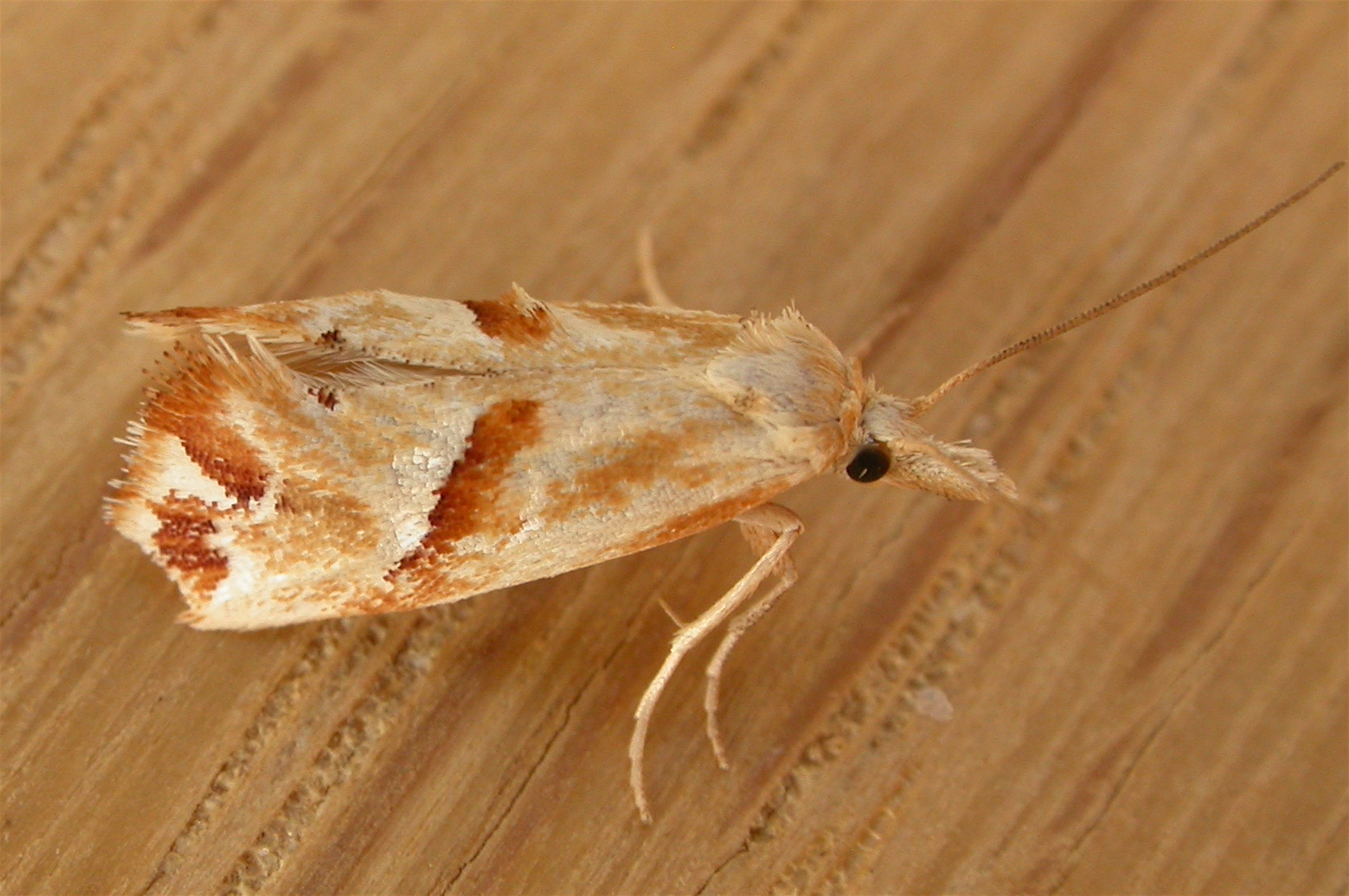

Scientific classification
- Domain: Eukaryota
- Kingdom: Animalia
- Phylum: Arthropoda
- Class: Insecta
- Order: Lepidoptera
- Genus: Heliocosma
- Species: H. argyroleuca

Binomial name
- Heliocosma argyroleuca Lower, 1916

= Heliocosma argyroleuca =

Species of moth

Heliocosma argyroleuca is a species of moth of the Tortricoidea superfamily. It is found in Australia, including Tasmania.
