= Discophlebia celaena =

Variable stub moth

Scientific classification
- Kingdom: Animalia
- Phylum: Arthropoda
- Clade: Pancrustacea
- Class: Insecta
- Order: Lepidoptera
- Superfamily: Noctuoidea
- Family: Oenosandridae
- Genus: Discophlebia
- Species: D. celaena

Binomial name
- Discophlebia celaena (Turner, 1903)

Synonyms
- Themerastis celaena Turner, 1903

Species of moth

Discophlebia celaena, the variable stub moth, is a moth of the family Oenosandridae. The species was first described by Alfred Jefferis Turner in 1903. It is found in the south-east quarter of Australia. The larvae of D. celaena are believed to feed on Eucalyptus species, consistent with other members of the family Oenosandridae (Common, 1990). Adults are nocturnal and are most often observed in forested habitats during summer months.

The wingspan is about 40 mm.
