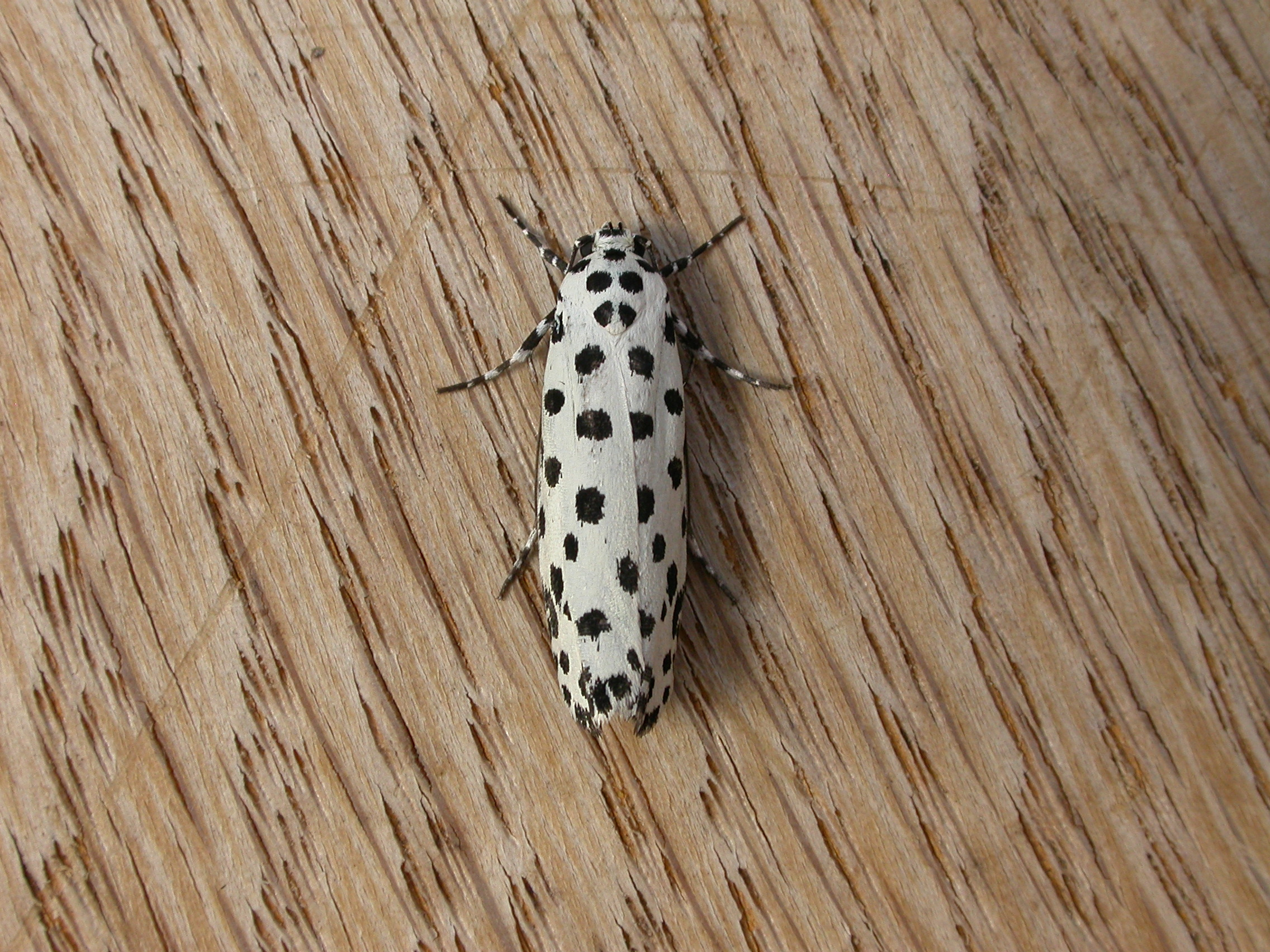

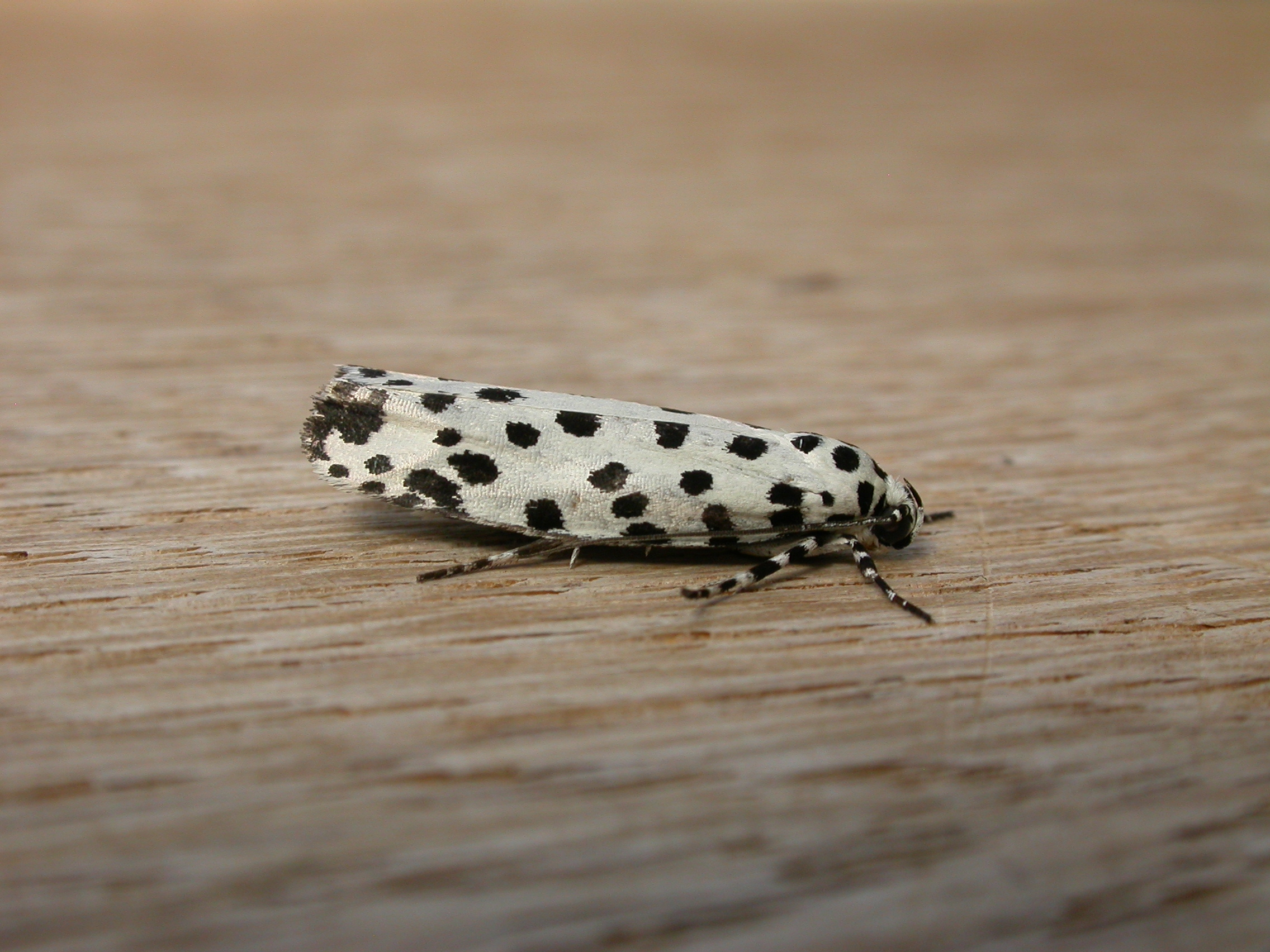

Scientific classification
- Kingdom: Animalia
- Phylum: Arthropoda
- Class: Insecta
- Order: Lepidoptera
- Family: Depressariidae
- Genus: Ethmia
- Species: E. clytodoxa

Binomial name
- Ethmia clytodoxa Turner, 1917

= Ethmia clytodoxa =

Species of moth

Ethmia clytodoxa is a moth of the family Depressariidae. It is known from the states of New South Wales and Queensland in Australia.
