= Metaprotus asuridia =

Scientific classification
- Domain: Eukaryota
- Kingdom: Animalia
- Phylum: Arthropoda
- Class: Insecta
- Order: Lepidoptera
- Family: Crambidae
- Genus: Metaprotus
- Species: M. asuridia

Binomial name
- Metaprotus asuridia (Butler, 1886)

Synonyms
- Gonocausta asuridia Butler, 1886

Species of moth

Metaprotus asuridia is a moth in the family Crambidae. It was described by Arthur Gardiner Butler in 1886. It is found in Australia, where it has been recorded from Queensland.
