= Discophlebia lipauges =

Scientific classification
- Kingdom: Animalia
- Phylum: Arthropoda
- Clade: Pancrustacea
- Class: Insecta
- Order: Lepidoptera
- Superfamily: Noctuoidea
- Family: Oenosandridae
- Genus: Discophlebia
- Species: D. lipauges

Binomial name
- Discophlebia lipauges Turner, 1917

Species of moth

Discophlebia lipauges is a moth of the family Oenosandridae first described by Alfred Jefferis Turner in 1917. It is found in Australia.
