= Ethmia sphaerosticha =

Scientific classification
- Kingdom: Animalia
- Phylum: Arthropoda
- Class: Insecta
- Order: Lepidoptera
- Family: Depressariidae
- Genus: Ethmia
- Species: E. sphaerosticha

Binomial name
- Ethmia sphaerosticha (Meyrick, 1887)

Synonyms
- Ceratophysetis sphaerosticha Meyrick, 1887

Species of moth

Ethmia sphaerosticha is a moth in the family Depressariidae. It is found in eastern Australia, including New South Wales and Queensland.

The larvae feed on the foliage of Ehretia acuminata.
