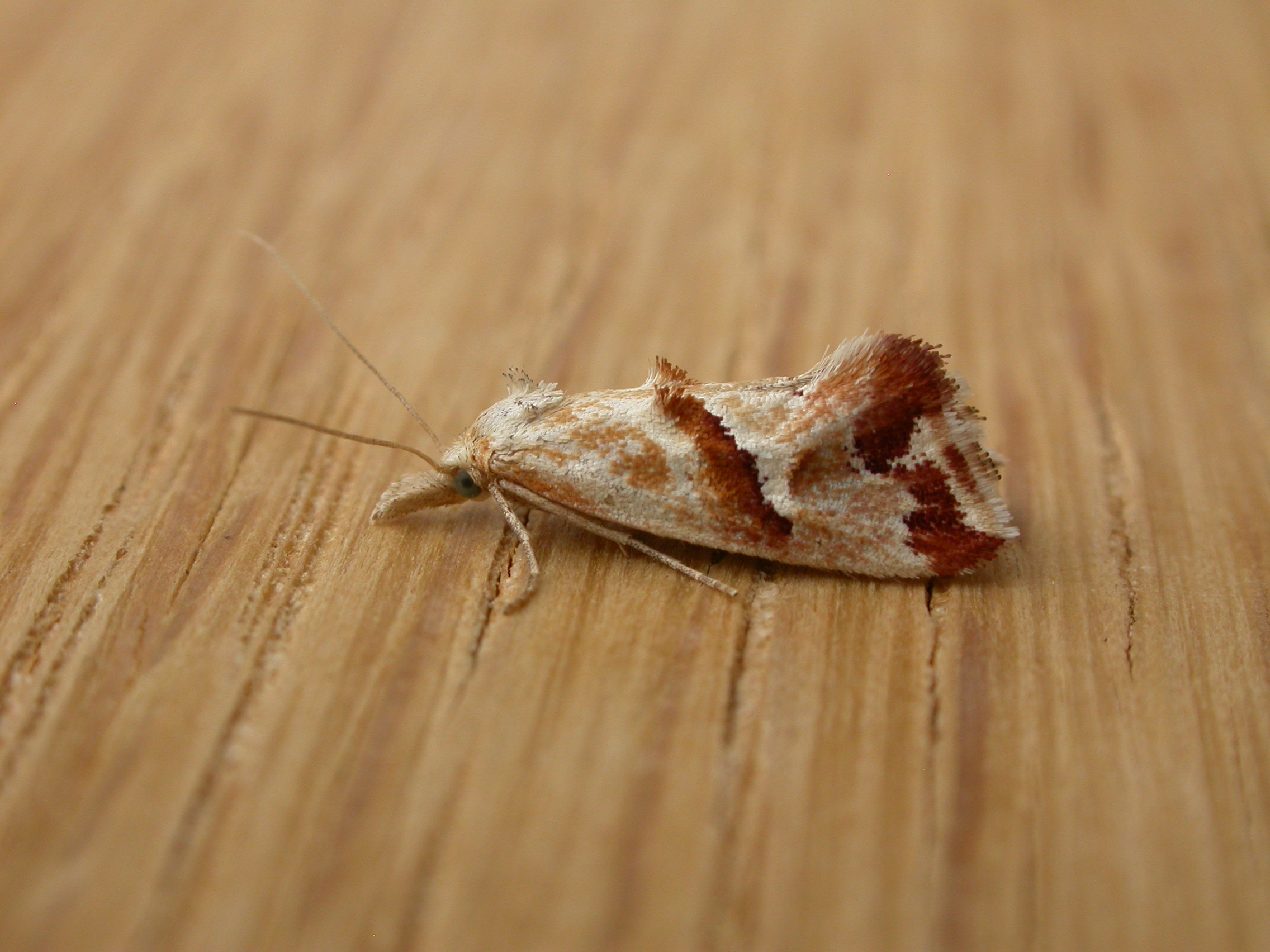

Scientific classification
- Kingdom: Animalia
- Phylum: Arthropoda
- Class: Insecta
- Order: Lepidoptera
- Genus: Heliocosma
- Species: H. incongruana

Binomial name
- Heliocosma incongruana (Walker, 1863)

Synonyms
- Conchylis albidana Walker, 1864

= Heliocosma incongruana =

Species of moth

Heliocosma incongruana is a species of moth of the Tortricoidea superfamily. It is known from the Australian Capital Territory and New South Wales.

The wingspan is about 15 mm. Adults have silvery white forewings with patches of raised brown scales.
