= Duplex horakae =

Scientific classification
- Domain: Eukaryota
- Kingdom: Animalia
- Phylum: Arthropoda
- Class: Insecta
- Order: Lepidoptera
- Superfamily: Noctuoidea
- Family: Erebidae
- Genus: Duplex
- Species: D. horakae

Binomial name
- Duplex horakae Fibiger, 2010

Species of moth

Duplex horakae is a moth of the family Erebidae first described by Michael Fibiger in 2010. It is known from the northern parts of Australia's Northern Territory and the north-eastern part of the state of Western Australia.

The wingspan is 7.5–9 mm.
