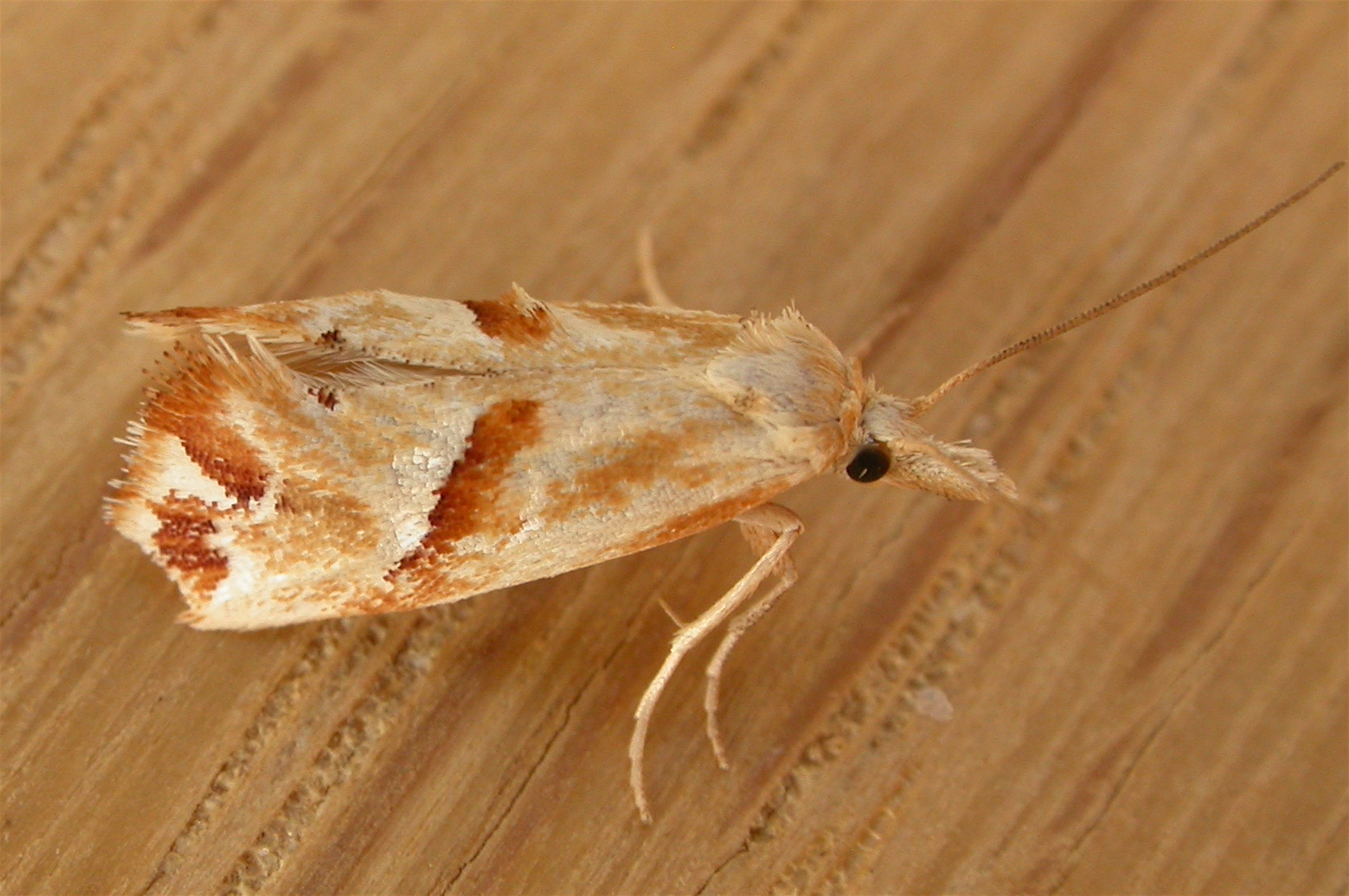
- Heliocosma argyroleuca

Scientific classification
- Kingdom: Animalia
- Phylum: Arthropoda
- Class: Insecta
- Order: Lepidoptera
- Superfamily: Tortricoidea
- Genus: Heliocosma; Meyrick, 1881

Synonyms
- Helioocosoma Razowski, 1977

= Heliocosma =

Genus of moths

Heliocosma is a genus of moths, mostly placed in the Tortricoidea superfamily and Tortricidae family. Others recognise as and 'unplaced genus', while some molecular data suggest it belongs to Zygaenoidea.

== Species ==
- Heliocosma anthodes Meyrick, 1910
- Heliocosma argyroleuca Lower, 1916
- Heliocosma exoeca Meyrick, 1910
- Heliocosma incongruana (Walker, 1863)
- Heliocosma melanotypa Turner, 1925
- Heliocosma rhodopnoana Meyrick, 1881
