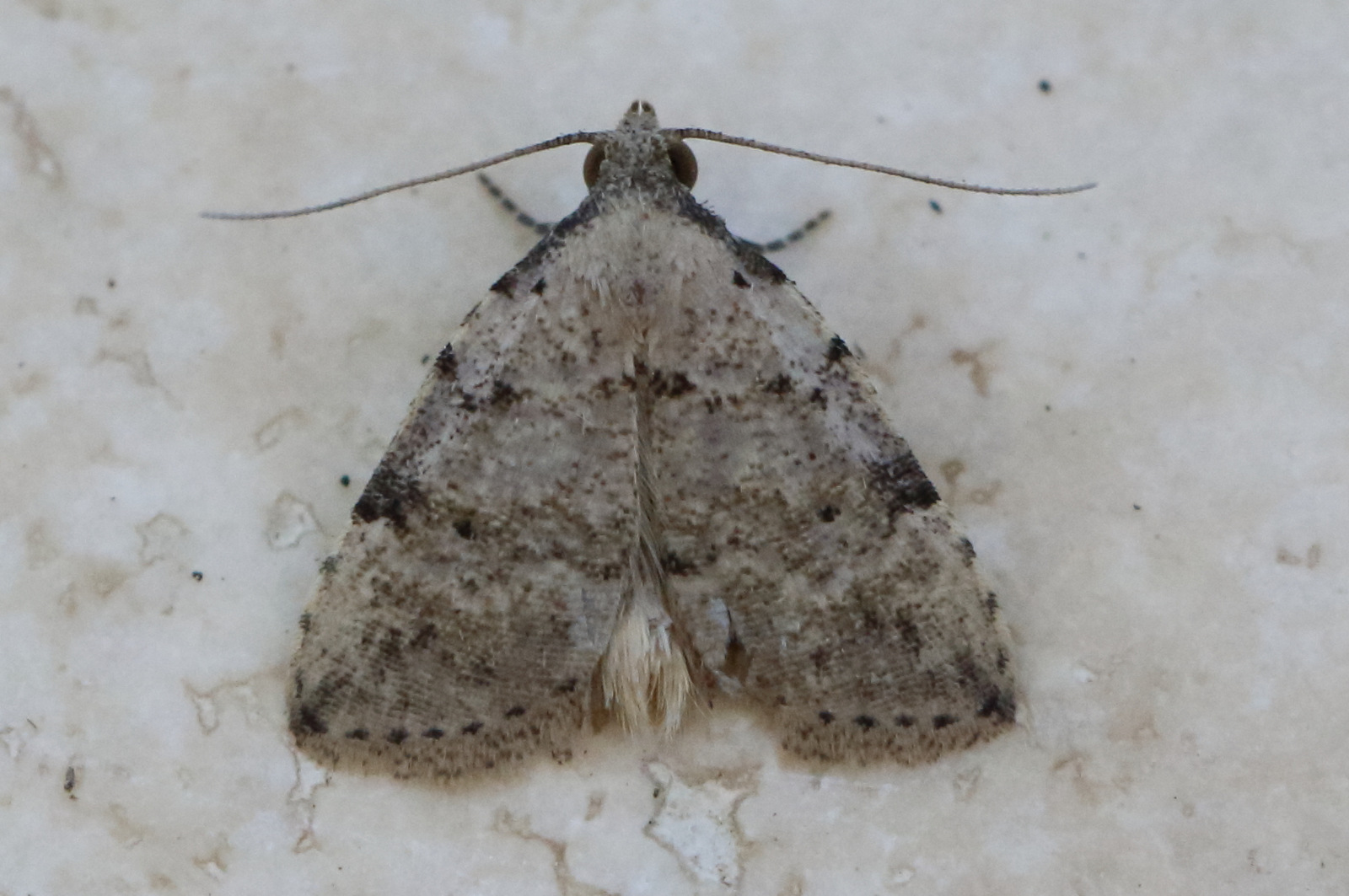

Scientific classification
- Kingdom: Animalia
- Phylum: Arthropoda
- Class: Insecta
- Order: Lepidoptera
- Superfamily: Noctuoidea
- Family: Erebidae
- Genus: Magna; Fibiger, 2008
- Species: M. myops

Binomial name
- Magna myops (Hampson, 1907)

Synonyms
- Tolpia myops Hampson, 1907

= Magna myops =

Species of moth

Magna is a genus of moths of the family Erebidae erected by Michael Fibiger in 2008. Its only species, Magna myops, was first described by George Hampson in 1907. It is known from the mountains of Sri Lanka. Records for other countries are misidentifications.

There are multiple generations per year, with adults recorded year round.

The wingspan is 15 to 19 millimetres (0.59 to 0.75 in).
