= Choristis =

Scientific classification
- Kingdom: Animalia
- Phylum: Arthropoda
- Class: Insecta
- Order: Lepidoptera
- Superfamily: Tortricoidea
- Family: Unassigned
- Genus: Choristis Turner, 1945
- Species: C. discotypa

Binomial name
- Choristis discotypa (Turner, 1916)

Synonyms
- Heliocosma discotypa Turner, 1916

Species of moth

Choristis discotypa is a species of moth of the Tortricoidea superfamily. It is found in Australia, where it has been recorded from Queensland.

The wingspan is about 12 mm. The forewings are whitish-grey, the costa tinged with reddish-brown and with reddish-brown markings, which are edged with ochreous-whitish. The hindwings are grey.
