= Discophlebia blosyrodes =

Scientific classification
- Kingdom: Animalia
- Phylum: Arthropoda
- Clade: Pancrustacea
- Class: Insecta
- Order: Lepidoptera
- Superfamily: Noctuoidea
- Family: Oenosandridae
- Genus: Discophlebia
- Species: D. blosyrodes

Binomial name
- Discophlebia blosyrodes Turner, 1903

Species of moth

Discophlebia blosyrodes is a moth of the family Oenosandridae first described by Alfred Jefferis Turner in 1903. It is found in Australia.
