= Ethmia postica =

Scientific classification
- Kingdom: Animalia
- Phylum: Arthropoda
- Clade: Pancrustacea
- Class: Insecta
- Order: Lepidoptera
- Family: Depressariidae
- Genus: Ethmia
- Species: E. postica

Binomial name
- Ethmia postica (Zeller, 1877)

Synonyms
- Psecadia postica Zeller, 1877; Psecadia sciaptera Lower, 1903

Species of moth

Ethmia postica is a moth in the family Depressariidae. It occurs in the interior areas of Australia, from north-western and south central Western Australia to western Queensland, New South Wales and Victoria.

== Description ==
E. postica's wingspan is 21–22 mm (0.83–0.87 in). The forewings of the species are white, with blackish-fuscous markings. The costal edge is of the wing is blackish, interrupted about one-fourth and near the apex. There are a number of spots on the dorsal side of the forewings. For example there is an irregular costal spot near the base and a dorsal dot at one-fourth, an irregular costal spot near the base and a dorsal dot at one-fourth. There is an irregular bar from one-fifth of the costa, reaching three-fourths across the wing and there is a small subdorsal spot before the middle. There is also a small triangular spot on the costa at two-fifths, and a dot below it and a small triangular spot on the costa beyond the middle. A transverse S-shaped mark is found beyond the middle towards the dorsum, but not reaching it, and a discal dot is found at three-fourths and there is an irregular transverse line from about three-fourths of the costa to the tornus, curved outwards from near the costa to three-fourths, whence a sharp projection proceeds to touch the lower side of the preceding discal dot. Finally, there is a slender streak along the termen, all on E. postica's forewings. Th hindwings of this species are white and thinly scaled with the costa and apical fourth fuscous, and darker towards the apex.
