= Austromartyria porphyrodes =

Scientific classification
- Domain: Eukaryota
- Kingdom: Animalia
- Phylum: Arthropoda
- Class: Insecta
- Order: Lepidoptera
- Family: Micropterigidae
- Genus: Austromartyria
- Species: A. porphyrodes

Binomial name
- Austromartyria porphyrodes (Turner, 1932)

Synonyms
- Sabatinca porphyrodes Turner, 1932

Moth species in family Micropterigidae

Austromartyria porphyrodes is a moth of the family Micropterigidae. It is only known to be from the higher rainfall regions of the Atherton Tableland in northern Queensland.

The forewing length is 3.5 mm for males and 4 mm for females.
