= Metaprotus magnifica =

Scientific classification
- Domain: Eukaryota
- Kingdom: Animalia
- Phylum: Arthropoda
- Class: Insecta
- Order: Lepidoptera
- Family: Crambidae
- Genus: Metaprotus
- Species: M. magnifica

Binomial name
- Metaprotus magnifica (Meyrick, 1887)

Synonyms
- Siculodes magnifica Meyrick, 1887

Species of moth

Metaprotus magnifica is a moth in the family Crambidae. It was described by Edward Meyrick in 1887. It is found in Australia, where it has been recorded from New South Wales.

The wingspan is about 18 mm. The forewings are black with three orange fasciae and an orange dot at the costa. The hindwings are black with a broad orange median band and a small cloudy orange spot beneath the costa before the apex, as well as a larger orange spot before the middle of the hindmargin. Adults have been recorded on wing in October.
