= Nycteropa =

Scientific classification
- Domain: Eukaryota
- Kingdom: Animalia
- Phylum: Arthropoda
- Class: Insecta
- Order: Lepidoptera
- Superfamily: Noctuoidea
- Family: Oenosandridae
- Genus: Nycteropa; Turner, 1941
- Species: N. subovalis

Binomial name
- Nycteropa subovalis Turner, 1941

Synonyms
- Oxymetopa phaeogramma Turner, 1943

Genus of moths

Nycteropa subovalis is a moth of the family Oenosandridae and only member of the genus Nycteropa.

The wingspan is about 40 mm.
