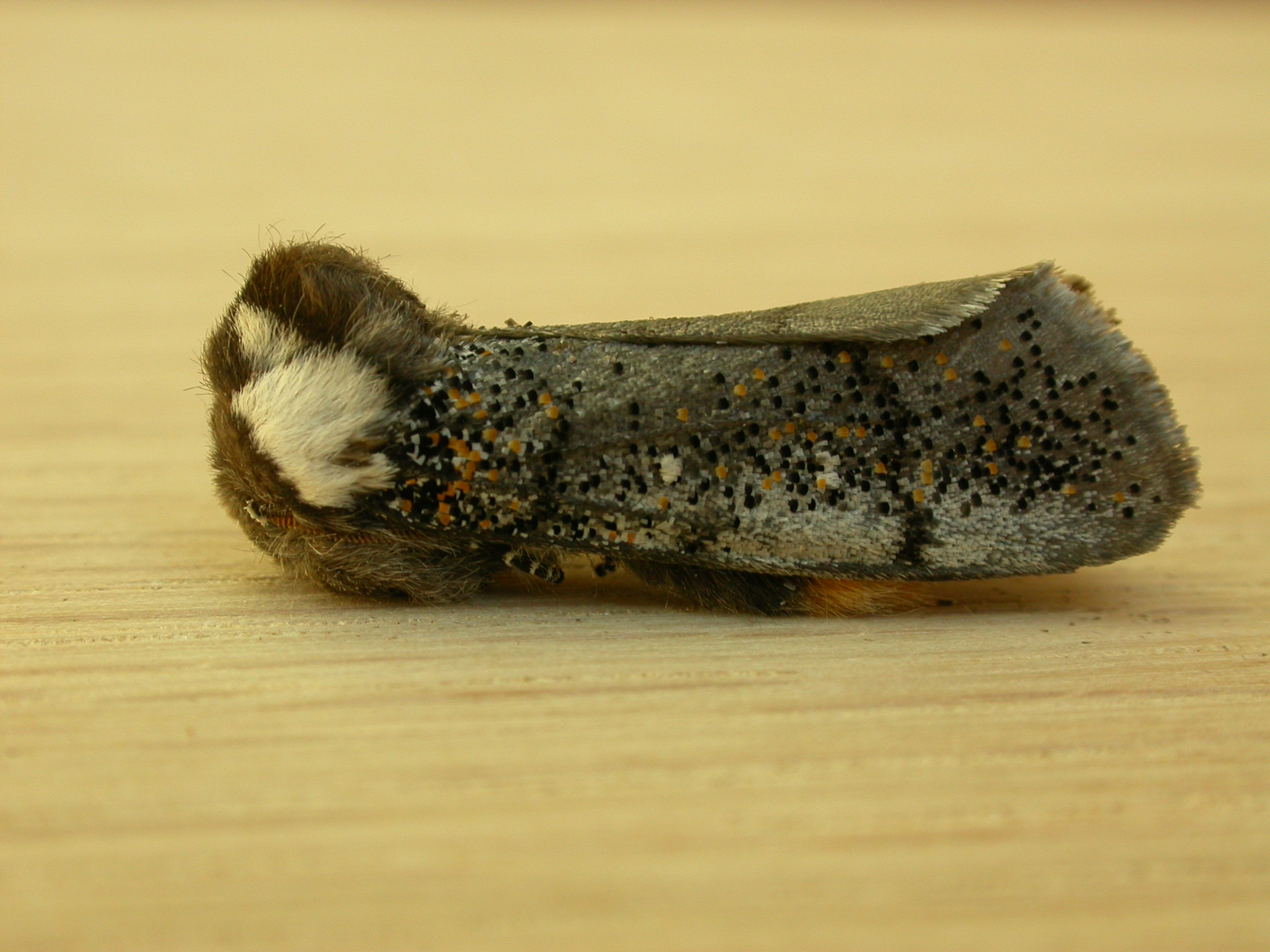
- Male
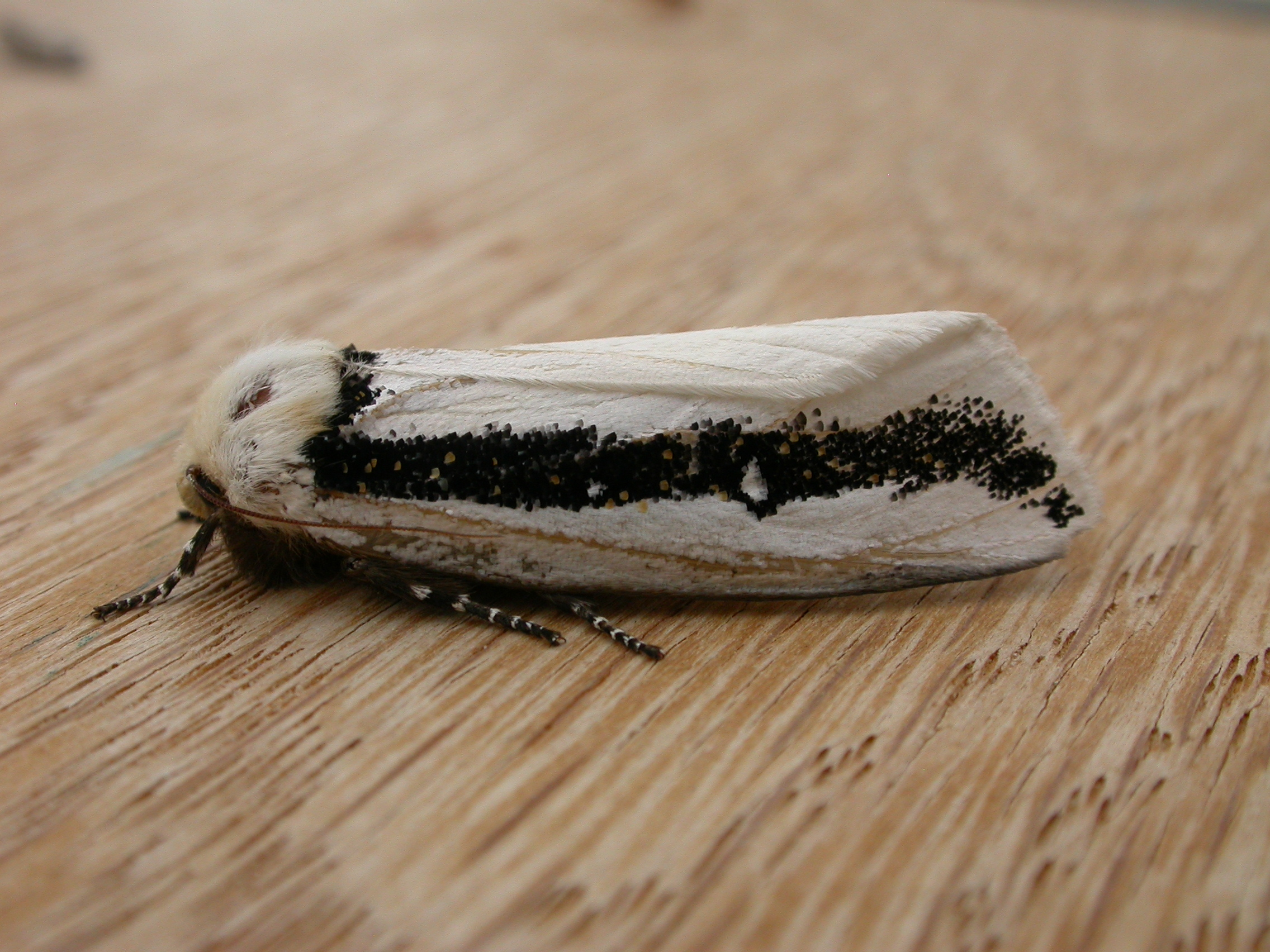
- Female

Scientific classification
- Domain: Eukaryota
- Kingdom: Animalia
- Phylum: Arthropoda
- Class: Insecta
- Order: Lepidoptera
- Superfamily: Noctuoidea
- Family: Oenosandridae
- Genus: Oenosandra; Newman, 1856
- Species: O. boisduvalii

Binomial name
- Oenosandra boisduvalii Newman, 1856

Synonyms
- Oenosanda duponchelii Walker, 1856; Teara terminalis Walker, 1856; Teara luctipennis Walker, 1869; Lomatosticha nigrostriata Möschler, 1872; Pterygosoma squamipunctum R. Felder, 1874; Oenosanda duponcheli Tepper, 1890; Oenosanda boisduvali Strand, 1929

= Oenosandra =

Genus of moths

Oenosandra is a monotypic moth genus in the family Oenosandridae. Its only species, Oenosandra boisduvalii, or Boisduval's autumn moth, is found in the southern half of Australia, including Tasmania. Both the genus and species were first described by Edward Newman in 1856.

The wingspan is about 50 mm.

The larvae feed on Eucalyptus species.
