= Diceratucha =

Scientific classification
- Kingdom: Animalia
- Phylum: Arthropoda
- Clade: Pancrustacea
- Class: Insecta
- Order: Lepidoptera
- Superfamily: Noctuoidea
- Family: Oenosandridae
- Genus: Diceratucha; Lower, 1902
- Species: D. xenopis

Binomial name
- Diceratucha xenopis Lower, 1902

Synonyms
- Oenone xenopis Lower, 1902

Single-species genus of moths

Diceratucha xenopis is a moth of the family Oenosandridae and only member of the monotypic genus Diceratucha. It is found in Australia.
