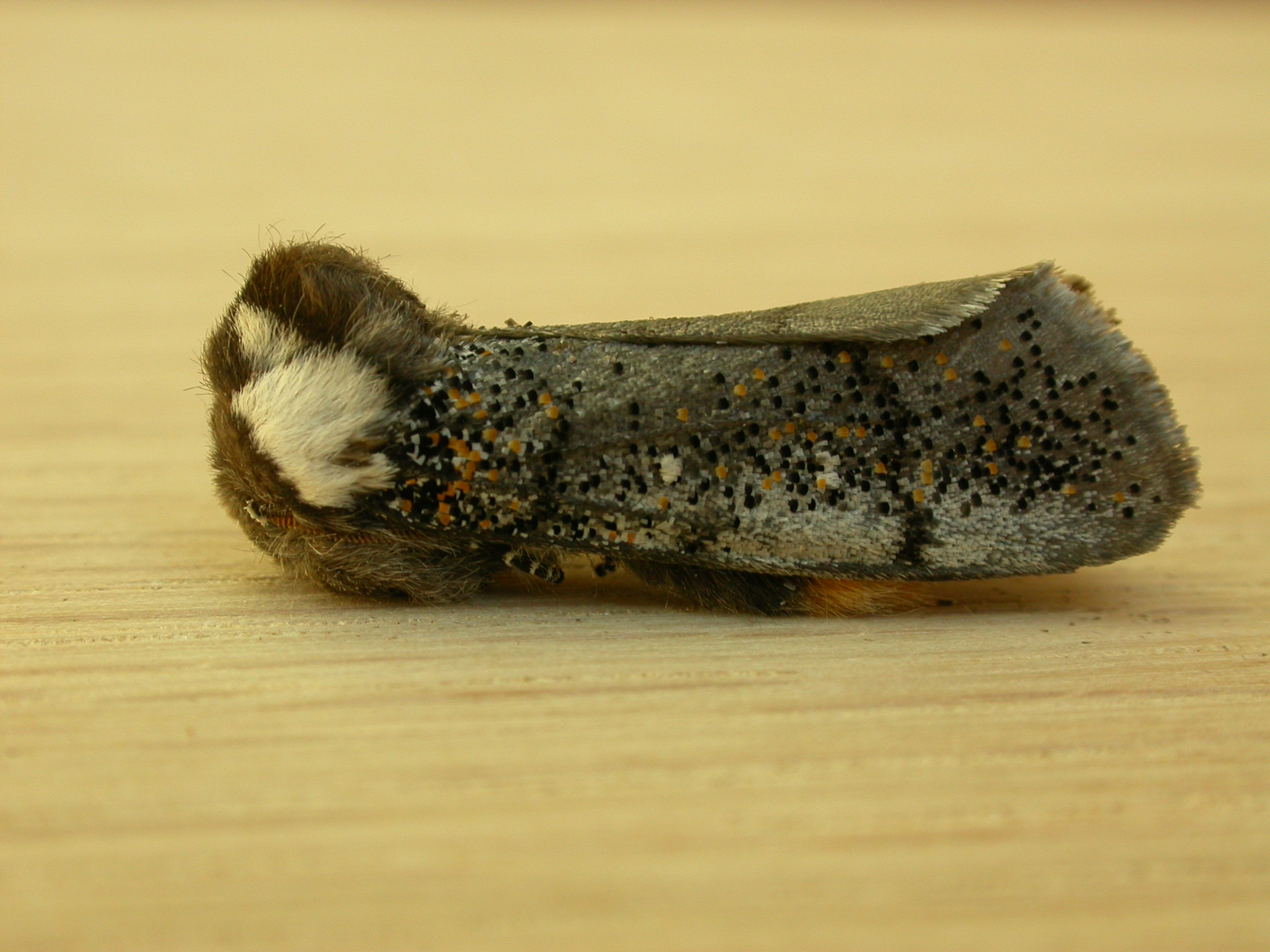
- Oenosandra boisduvallii

Scientific classification
- Kingdom: Animalia
- Phylum: Arthropoda
- Clade: Pancrustacea
- Class: Insecta
- Order: Lepidoptera
- Superfamily: Noctuoidea
- Family: Oenosandridae; Miller, 1991

= Oenosandridae =

Family of moths

Oenosandridae is a family of Australian noctuoid moths. Genera include:

- Diceratucha
- Discophlebia
- Nycteropa
- Oenosandra
