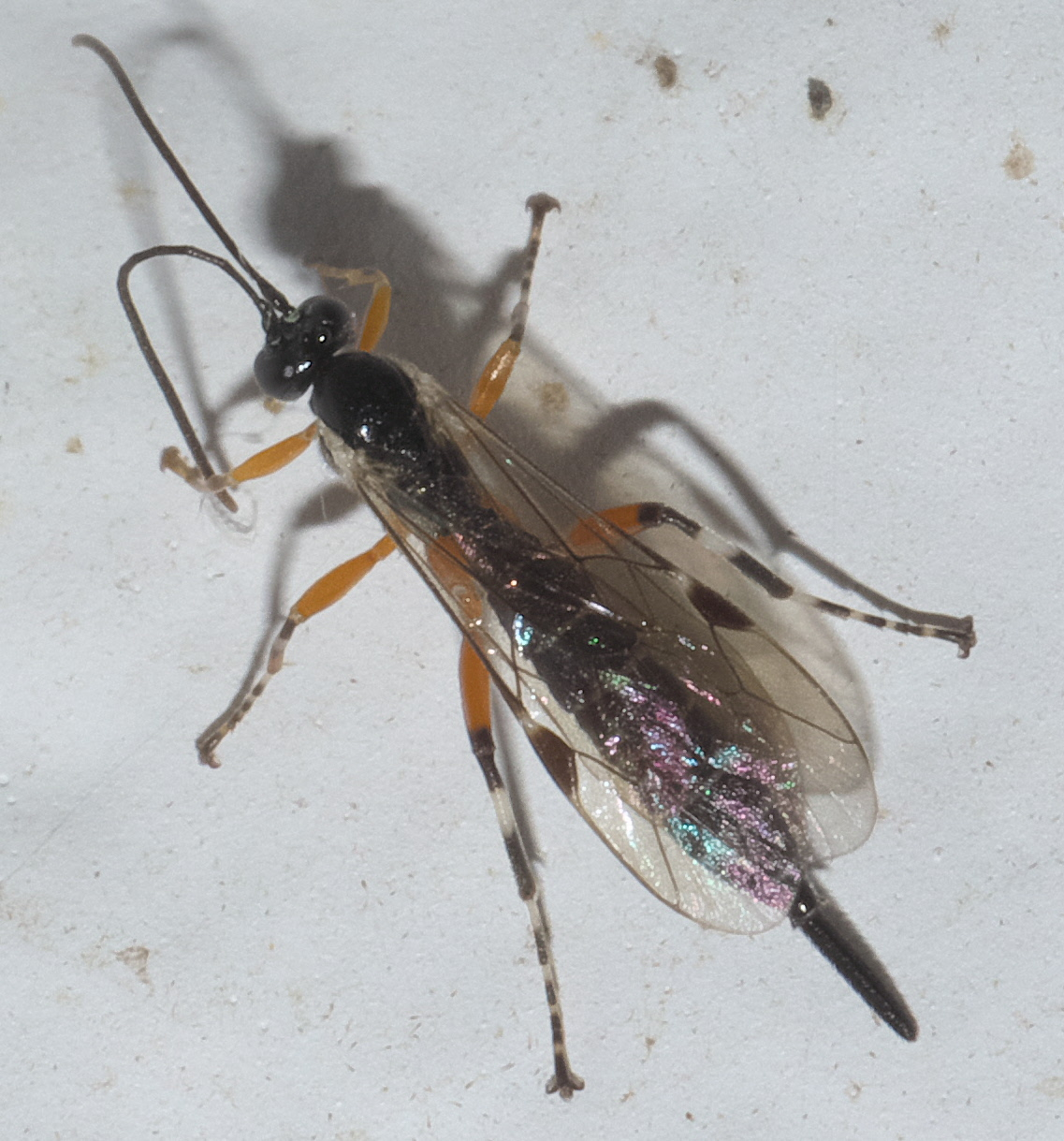
- Itoplectis conquisitor

Scientific classification
- Domain: Eukaryota
- Kingdom: Animalia
- Phylum: Arthropoda
- Class: Insecta
- Order: Hymenoptera
- Superfamily: Ichneumonoidea
- Family: Ichneumonidae
- Subfamily: Pimplinae
- Tribe: Pimplini
- Genus: Itoplectis; Förster, 1869

= Itoplectis =

Genus of wasps

Itoplectis is a genus of parasitoid wasp belonging to the family Ichneumonidae. The genus was first described by Arnold Förster in 1869.

The genus has cosmopolitan distribution.

== Species ==
There are about 35 species of Itoplectis according to Kasparyan. GBIF includes 61 species:

- Itoplectis albipes Seyrig, 1932
- Itoplectis alternans (Gravenhorst, 1829)
- Itoplectis alturae Gauld, Ugalde & Hanson, 1998
- Itoplectis aterrima Jussila, 1965
- Itoplectis australis Momoi, 1966
- Itoplectis behrensii (Cresson, 1879)
- Itoplectis brasiliensis (Dalla Torre, 1901)
- Itoplectis clavicornis (Thomson, 1889)
- Itoplectis conquisitor (Say, 1836)
- Itoplectis cristatae Iwata, 1961
- Itoplectis curticauda (Kriechbaumer, 1887)
- Itoplectis decora Förster, 1888
- Itoplectis discrepans Förster, 1888
- Itoplectis enslini (Ulbricht, 1911)
- Itoplectis evetriae Viereck, 1913
- Itoplectis flavicincta Förster, 1888
- Itoplectis fustiger Townes, 1960
- Itoplectis glabra (Morley, 1914)
- Itoplectis gonzalezi Kasparyan, 2007
- Itoplectis himalayensis Gupta, 1968
- Itoplectis homonae Sonan, 1930
- Itoplectis insignis Perkins, 1957
- Itoplectis insularis Hellen, 1949
- Itoplectis lavaudeni Seyrig, 1932
- Itoplectis leucobasis Momoi, 1971
- Itoplectis lissa Porter, 1970
- Itoplectis lissos Momoi, 1973
- Itoplectis maculator (Fabricius, 1775)
- Itoplectis marianneae Gauld, 1991
- Itoplectis medioflava (Morley, 1914)
- Itoplectis melanocephala (Gravenhorst, 1829) - hosts include Galleria mellonella, Aletia impura, Chilo phragmitellus, Depressaria daucella, Depressaria pastinacella, and Leucania obsoleta.
- Itoplectis melanocera Förster, 1888
- Itoplectis melanopus Momoi, 1973
- Itoplectis melanospila (Cameron, 1906)
- Itoplectis melanthes Momoi, 1973
- Itoplectis mexicanus Kasparyan & Niño, 2004 - host is the pupa of Coptocycla texana
- Itoplectis multicolor Kasparyan, 2007
- Itoplectis naranyae (Ashmead 1906)
- Itoplectis nefasta Förster, 1888
- Itoplectis nigrithorax Kasparyan, 2007
- Itoplectis niobe (Schrottky, 1902)
- Itoplectis ocris Momoi, 1973
- Itoplectis oreius Momoi, 1973
- Itoplectis philippinensis Momoi, 1971
- Itoplectis phoenogaster Porter, 1970
- Itoplectis provocator (Seyrig, 1935)
- Itoplectis quadricingulatus (Provancher, 1880)
- Itoplectis roberti Gauld, 1991
- Itoplectis santoshae Gupta, 1968
- Itoplectis saxosa Cockerell, 1921
- Itoplectis specularis Kasparyan, 2007
- Itoplectis spilopus Momoi, 1973
- Itoplectis suada (Tosquinet, 1896)
- Itoplectis tabatai (Uchida, 1930)
- Itoplectis tibetensis Perkins, 1957
- Itoplectis triannulata Uchida, 1928
- Itoplectis tunetana (Schmiedeknecht, 1914)
- Itoplectis vesca Townes, 1960
- Itoplectis viduata (Gravenhorst, 1829)
- Itoplectis virga Momoi, 1973
- Itoplectis winnieae Gauld, Ugalde & Hanson, 1998
