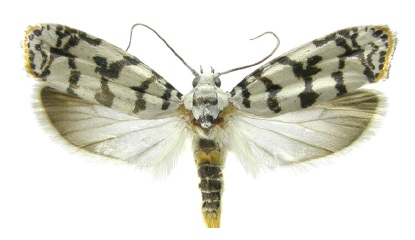

Scientific classification
- Domain: Eukaryota
- Kingdom: Animalia
- Phylum: Arthropoda
- Class: Insecta
- Order: Lepidoptera
- Family: Depressariidae
- Genus: Ethmia
- Species: E. delliella

Binomial name
- Ethmia delliella (Fernald, 1891)

Synonyms
- Psecadia delliella Fernald, 1891; Babaiaxa delliella; Tamarrha delliella

= Ethmia delliella =

Species of moth

Ethmia delliella, the ladder-backed ethmia moth, is a moth in the family Depressariidae. It is found from the Gulf region of Texas and Mexico to the west coastal plain of Mexico, Chiapas, El Salvador and Costa Rica.

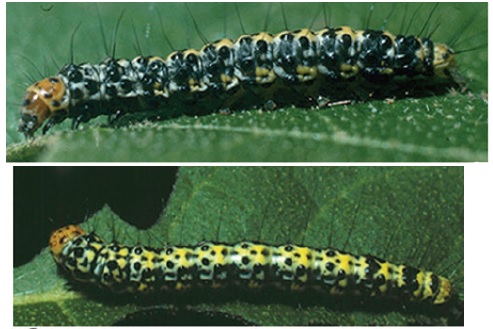
Larva

The length of the forewings is 9–12 mm (0.35–0.47 in). The ground color of the forewings is white with black markings, reflecting metallic steel blue. The ground color of the hindwings is white, becoming slightly to strongly brown toward the apex. Adults are on wing from March to October in Texas and from April to August elsewhere. There are probably multiple generations per year.

The larvae feed on Ehretia elliptica and Cordia alliodora.
