= Ethmia semiombra =

Scientific classification
- Kingdom: Animalia
- Phylum: Arthropoda
- Class: Insecta
- Order: Lepidoptera
- Family: Depressariidae
- Genus: Ethmia
- Species: E. semiombra

Binomial name
- Ethmia semiombra Dyar, 1902

Species of moth

Ethmia semiombra is a moth in the family Depressariidae. It is found in Texas and Mexico.

The length of the forewings is 9.2–11.7 mm (0.36–0.46 in). The ground color of the forewings is dark on the costal half and whitish, lightly to heavily tinged with gray on the dorsal half. The ground color of the hindwings is whitish basally, becoming pale brownish on the apical half. Adults of subspecies semiombra are on wing in February, May, June and September (in Texas) and July (in Tamaulipas). There are probably multiple generations per year.

The larvae probably feed on Ehretia elliptica.

== Subspecies ==
- Ethmia semiombra semiombra (eastern Mexico and southern Texas)
- Ethmia semiombra nebulombra Powell, 1973 (Yucatán)
