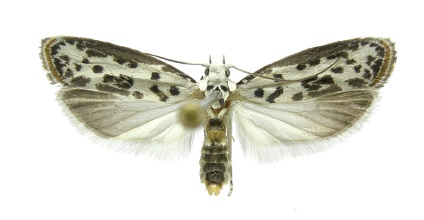

Scientific classification
- Domain: Eukaryota
- Kingdom: Animalia
- Phylum: Arthropoda
- Class: Insecta
- Order: Lepidoptera
- Family: Depressariidae
- Genus: Ethmia
- Species: E. bittenella

Binomial name
- Ethmia bittenella (Busck, 1906)

Synonyms
- Tamarrha bittenella Busck, 1906

= Ethmia bittenella =

Species of moth

Ethmia bittenella is a moth in the family Depressariidae. It is found in the United States from southern Texas to southern and central Mexico (Chiapas and Guerrero) and then northward along the west coast to Sinaloa and Sonora. It is also found in north-western Costa Rica.

The length of the forewings is 7.4–9.6 mm (0.29–0.38 in). The ground color of the forewings is white with blackish brown markings, those longitudinally through the middle of the wing are reflecting metallic blue. The ground color of the hindwings is whitish basally, becoming pale brownish on the apical half. Adults are on wing in February, March, May, June and November (in Texas) and from late June to August (in Sonora and Sinaloa).

The larvae possibly feed on Ehretia anacua. Pupae were collected in galleries in stems of Pseudabutilon lozani, which probably represents a pupation site only.
