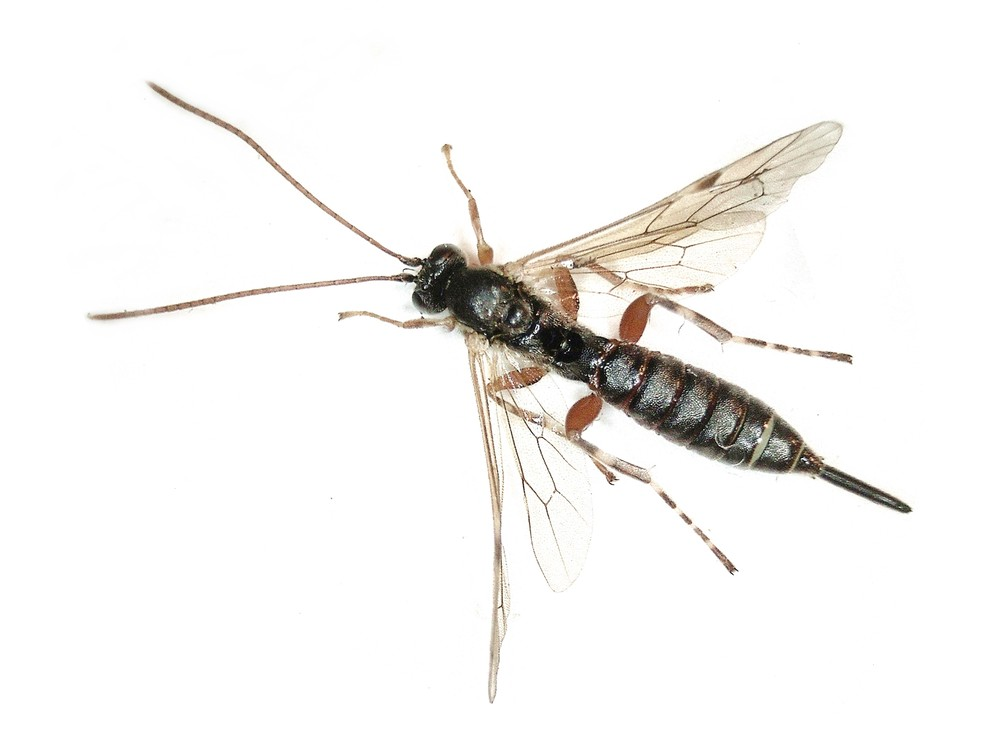

Scientific classification
- Domain: Eukaryota
- Kingdom: Animalia
- Phylum: Arthropoda
- Class: Insecta
- Order: Hymenoptera
- Family: Ichneumonidae
- Subfamily: Pimplinae
- Tribe: Pimplini
- Genus: Itoplectis
- Species: I. maculator

Binomial name
- Itoplectis maculator (Fabricius, 1775)

= Itoplectis maculator =

Species of wasp

Itoplectis maculator is a species of insect belonging to the family Ichneumonidae.

It is native to Europe. Hosts include Archips rosana and Tortrix viridana.
