= Coptocycla ganglbaueri =

Scientific classification
- Kingdom: Animalia
- Phylum: Arthropoda
- Clade: Pancrustacea
- Class: Insecta
- Order: Coleoptera
- Suborder: Polyphaga
- Infraorder: Cucujiformia
- Family: Chrysomelidae
- Genus: Coptocycla
- Species: C. ganglbaueri

Binomial name
- Coptocycla ganglbaueri Spaeth, 1909

Species of beetle

Coptocycla ganglbaueri is a species of beetle of the family Chrysomelidae. It is found in Brazil (Pernambuco).
