= Coptocycla elegans =

Scientific classification
- Kingdom: Animalia
- Phylum: Arthropoda
- Class: Insecta
- Order: Coleoptera
- Suborder: Polyphaga
- Infraorder: Cucujiformia
- Family: Chrysomelidae
- Genus: Coptocycla
- Species: C. elegans

Binomial name
- Coptocycla elegans Boheman, 1855

Species of beetle

Coptocycla elegans is a species of leaf beetle in the genus Coptocycla found in Brazil.
