= Coptocycla roseocincta =

Scientific classification
- Kingdom: Animalia
- Phylum: Arthropoda
- Clade: Pancrustacea
- Class: Insecta
- Order: Coleoptera
- Suborder: Polyphaga
- Infraorder: Cucujiformia
- Family: Chrysomelidae
- Genus: Coptocycla
- Species: C. roseocincta

Binomial name
- Coptocycla roseocincta Boheman, 1855

Species of beetle

Coptocycla roseocincta is a species of beetle of the family Chrysomelidae. It is found in Brazil (Bahia, São Paulo and possibly Pernambuco).
