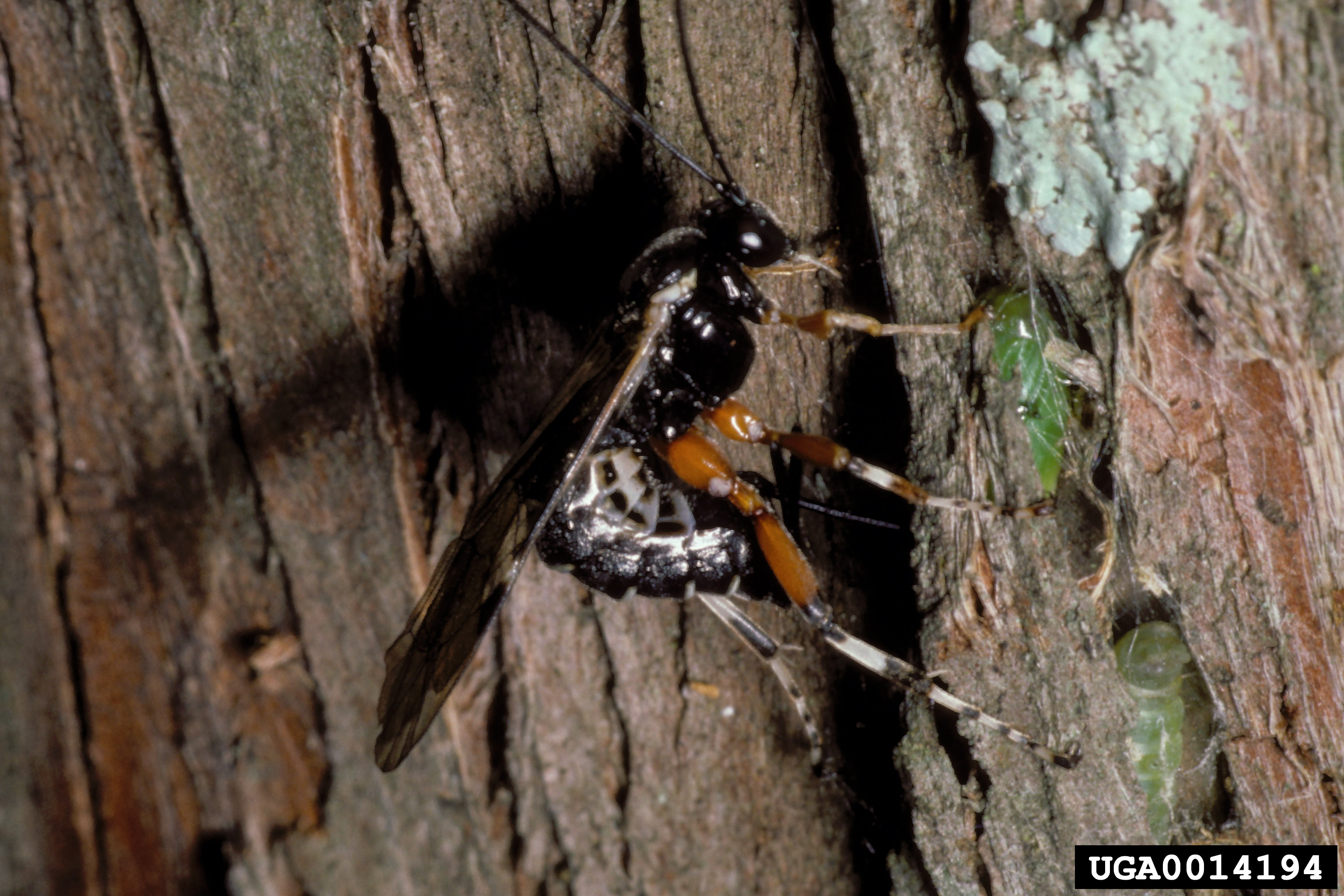

Scientific classification
- Kingdom: Animalia
- Phylum: Arthropoda
- Class: Insecta
- Order: Hymenoptera
- Family: Ichneumonidae
- Genus: Itoplectis
- Species: I. conquisitor

Binomial name
- Itoplectis conquisitor (Say, 1835)

Synonyms
- Cryptus conquisitor

= Itoplectis conquisitor =

Species of parasitoid wasp

Itoplectis conquisitor is a wasp species in the Ichneumonidae family of parasitoid wasps.

== Range ==
Itoplectis conquisitor is found across North America, on the East Coast from Pennsylvania south through Florida, and on the West Coast from British Columbia extending south through Central America to Ecuador. As of September 16, 2023, data on iNaturalist noted observations found as far north as the Province of Québec, Canada in Eastern North America and as far north as Alaska in Western North America. Observations appear to be sparse and regional in Western North America. Some sightings have also appeared in Europe.

== Ecology ==
Itoplectis conquisitor practices multiparasitism.

== Taxonomy ==
Itoplectis conquisitor (synonym Cryptus conquisitor) was first described in scientific journals in 1835 by T. Say in "Descriptions of new North American Hymenoptera, and observations on some already described," Boston Journal of Natural History.
