= Coptocycla arcuata =

Scientific classification
- Kingdom: Animalia
- Phylum: Arthropoda
- Clade: Pancrustacea
- Class: Insecta
- Order: Coleoptera
- Suborder: Polyphaga
- Infraorder: Cucujiformia
- Family: Chrysomelidae
- Genus: Coptocycla
- Species: C. arcuata

Binomial name
- Coptocycla arcuata (Swederus, 1787)

Synonyms
- Cassida arcuata Swederus, 1787

Species of beetle

Coptocycla arcuata is a species of beetle of the family Chrysomelidae. It is found in Brazil (Minas Gerais, Rio de Janeiro, Santa Catarina, Pernambuco, São Paulo).
