= Coptocycla usta =

Scientific classification
- Kingdom: Animalia
- Phylum: Arthropoda
- Clade: Pancrustacea
- Class: Insecta
- Order: Coleoptera
- Suborder: Polyphaga
- Infraorder: Cucujiformia
- Family: Chrysomelidae
- Genus: Coptocycla
- Species: C. usta

Binomial name
- Coptocycla usta Boheman, 1855

Synonyms
- Microctenochira usta

Species of beetle

Coptocycla usta is a species of beetle of the family Chrysomelidae. It is found in Bolivia, Brazil (Goiás, Pará, Pernambuco), Colombia, Ecuador, French Guiana and Peru.
