= Coptocycla stigma =

Scientific classification
- Kingdom: Animalia
- Phylum: Arthropoda
- Clade: Pancrustacea
- Class: Insecta
- Order: Coleoptera
- Suborder: Polyphaga
- Infraorder: Cucujiformia
- Family: Chrysomelidae
- Genus: Coptocycla
- Species: C. stigma

Binomial name
- Coptocycla stigma (Germar, 1824)

Synonyms
- Cassida stigma Germar, 1824

Species of beetle

Coptocycla stigma is a species of beetle of the family Chrysomelidae. It is found in Argentina, Bolivia, and Brazil (Mato Grosso, Pará, Paraná, Rio de Janeiro, Santa Catarina, São Paulo, Pernambuco).
