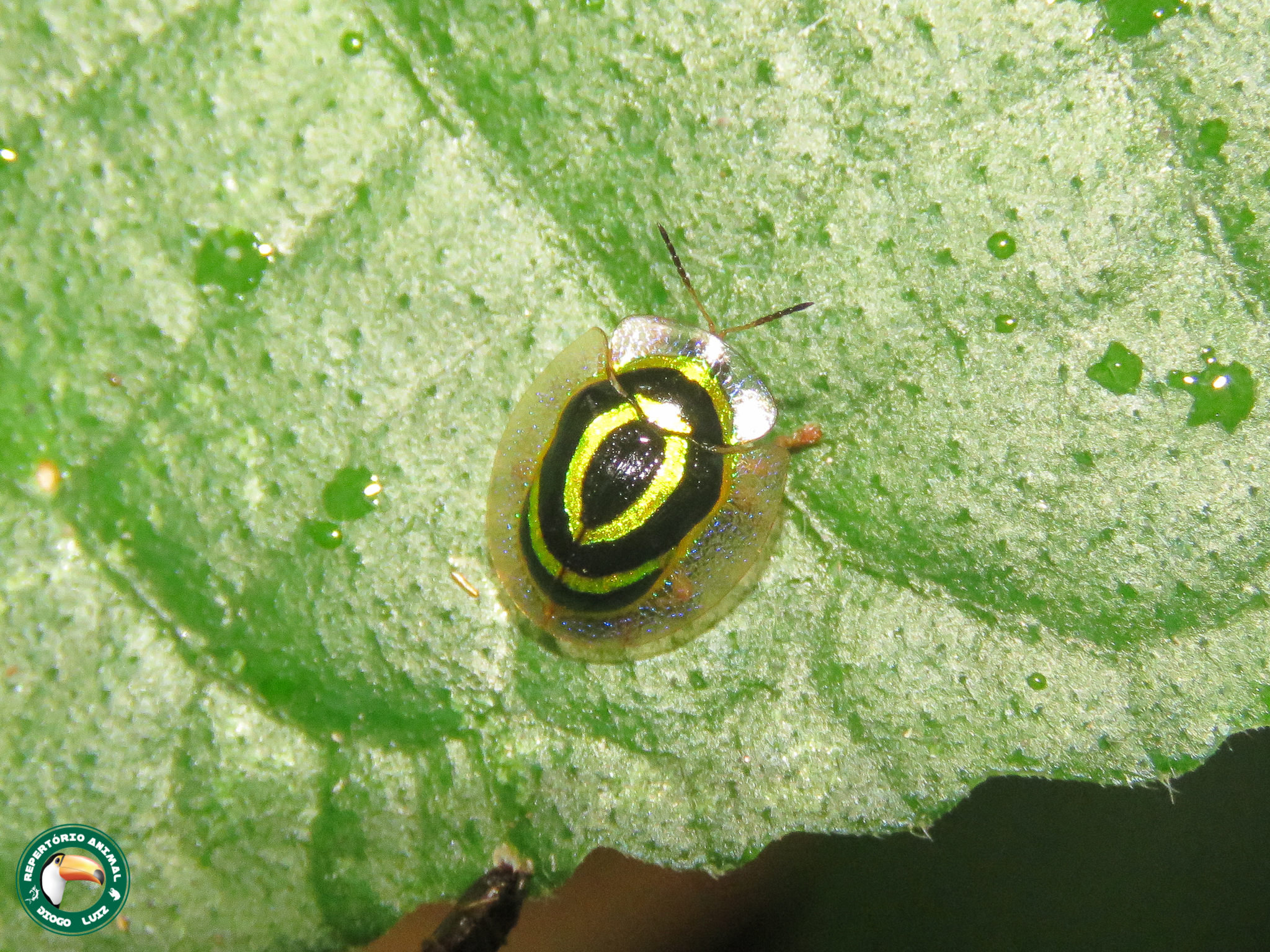
- Coptocycla lunifera

Scientific classification
- Kingdom: Animalia
- Phylum: Arthropoda
- Clade: Pancrustacea
- Class: Insecta
- Order: Coleoptera
- Suborder: Polyphaga
- Infraorder: Cucujiformia
- Family: Chrysomelidae
- Tribe: Cassidini
- Genus: Coptocycla; Chevrolat, 1837

Subgenera
- (Coptocycla); (Coptocyclella); (Dyscineta); (Podostraba); (Psalidonota)

= Coptocycla =

Genus of beetles

Coptocycla is a tortoise beetle genus in the subfamily Cassidinae.

== Species ==
These 58 species belong to the genus Coptocycla:

- Coptocycla adamantina (Germar, 1824)^{i c g}
- Coptocycla aerata (Boheman, 1855)^{i c g}
- Coptocycla apicata Spaeth, 1936^{i c g}
- Coptocycla arcuata (Swederus, 1787)^{i c g}
- Coptocycla atriceps (Boheman, 1855)^{i c g}
- Coptocycla auricoma Boheman, 1855^{i c g}
- Coptocycla aurifera Boheman, 1855^{i c g}
- Coptocycla bahiana Boheman, 1855^{i c g}
- Coptocycla bicolon (Germar, 1824)^{i c g}
- Coptocycla bicurvata Boheman, 1855^{i c g}
- Coptocycla bidivisa Boheman, 1862^{i c g}
- Coptocycla bisbipustulata Boheman, 1855^{i c g}
- Coptocycla circumspicua (Boheman, 1855)^{i c g}
- Coptocycla concolor Boheman, 1855^{i c g}
- Coptocycla conspicillata Boheman, 1855^{i c g}
- Coptocycla constellata Boheman, 1855^{i c g}
- Coptocycla contemta (Boheman, 1855)^{i c g}
- Coptocycla cruciata Linnaeus, 1767^{g}
- Coptocycla decussata Boheman, 1855^{i c g}
- Coptocycla dentata (Blake, 1965)^{i c g}
- Coptocycla dolosa Boheman, 1855^{i c g}
- Coptocycla dorsoplagiata Champion, 1894^{i c g}
- Coptocycla dorsopunctata (Klug, 1829)^{i c g}
- Coptocycla elegans Boheman, 1855^{i c g}
- Coptocycla excelsa Boheman, 1855^{i c g}
- Coptocycla exsanguis Boheman, 1855^{i c g}
- Coptocycla fastidiosa Boheman, 1855^{i c g}
- Coptocycla febricitans Spaeth, 1936^{i c g}
- Coptocycla flavovittata Boheman, 1855^{i c g}
- Coptocycla ganglbaueri (Spaeth, 1909)^{i c}
- Coptocycla infans Spaeth, 1937^{i c g}
- Coptocycla jamaicana Spaeth, 1936^{i c g}
- Coptocycla laeta Boheman, 1855^{i c g}
- Coptocycla laqueata Spaeth, 1936^{i c g}
- Coptocycla leprosa (Boheman, 1855)^{i c g}
- Coptocycla lunifera Boheman, 1855^{i c g}
- Coptocycla marmorata Champion, 1894^{i c g}
- Coptocycla mundula Boheman, 1862^{i c g}
- Coptocycla orbiculata Champion, 1894^{i c g}
- Coptocycla paranensis Spaeth, 1936^{i c g}
- Coptocycla placida Boheman, 1855^{i c g}
- Coptocycla quadrinotata Boheman, 1855^{i c g}
- Coptocycla robusta Spaeth, 1936^{i c g}
- Coptocycla roseocincta Boheman, 1855^{i c g}
- Coptocycla ruficornis Spaeth, 1936^{i c g}
- Coptocycla rufonotata Champion, 1894^{i c g}
- Coptocycla sagana Boheman, 1862^{i c g}
- Coptocycla sordida Boheman, 1855^{i c g}
- Coptocycla stigma (Germar, 1824)^{i c g}
- Coptocycla strandi Spaeth, 1936^{i c g}
- Coptocycla subovata Spaeth, 1937^{i c g}
- Coptocycla subpunctata Spaeth, 1937^{i c g}
- Coptocycla texana (Schaeffer, 1933)^{i c g b} (anacua tortoise beetle)
- Coptocycla undecimpunctata (Fabricius, 1781)^{i c g}
- Coptocycla usta Boheman, 1855^{i c g}
- Coptocycla vana Boheman, 1855^{i c g}
- Coptocycla virguncula Boheman, 1862^{i c g}
- Coptocycla vittipennis Boheman, 1855^{i c g}

Data sources: i = ITIS, c = Catalogue of Life, g = GBIF, b = Bugguide.net
