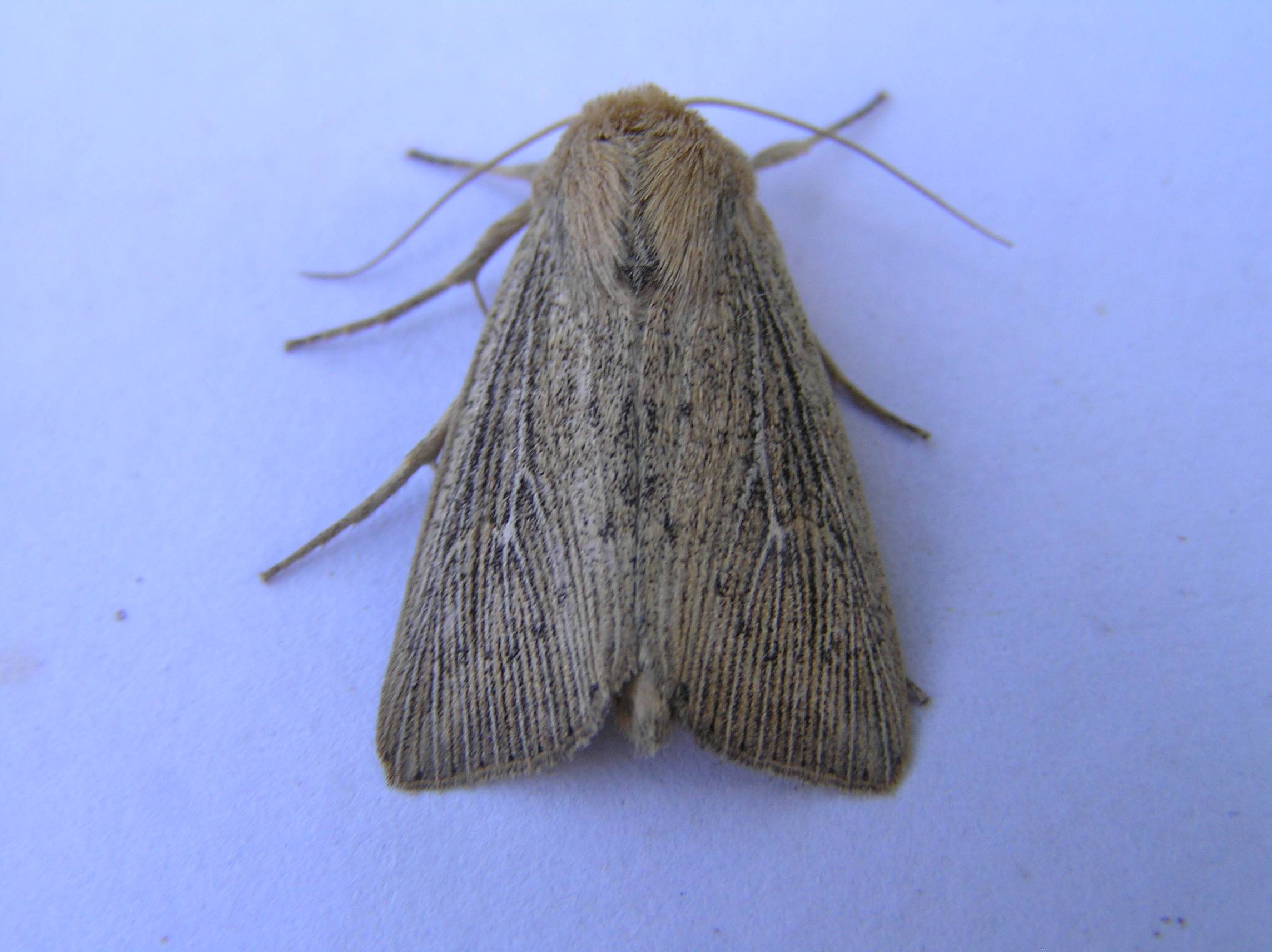

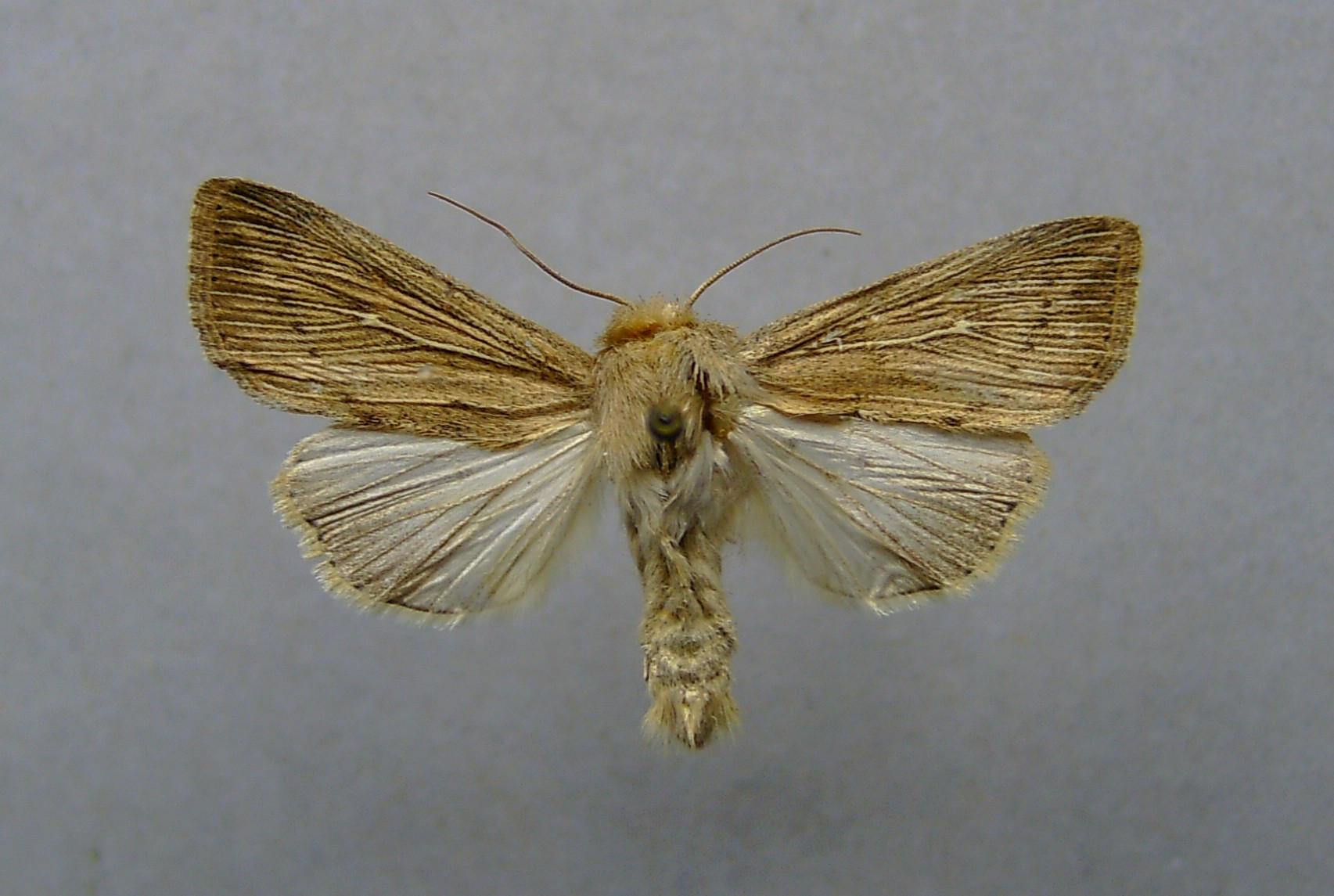

Scientific classification
- Domain: Eukaryota
- Kingdom: Animalia
- Phylum: Arthropoda
- Class: Insecta
- Order: Lepidoptera
- Superfamily: Noctuoidea
- Family: Noctuidae
- Genus: Leucania
- Species: L. obsoleta

Binomial name
- Leucania obsoleta (Hübner, 1803)

= Leucania obsoleta =

Species of moth

Leucania obsoleta, the obscure wainscot, is a moth of the superfamily Noctuoidea. The species was first described by Jacob Hübner in 1803. It is found in Europe.

The length of the forewings is 15–18 mm. The moth flies in one generation from early May to late July.

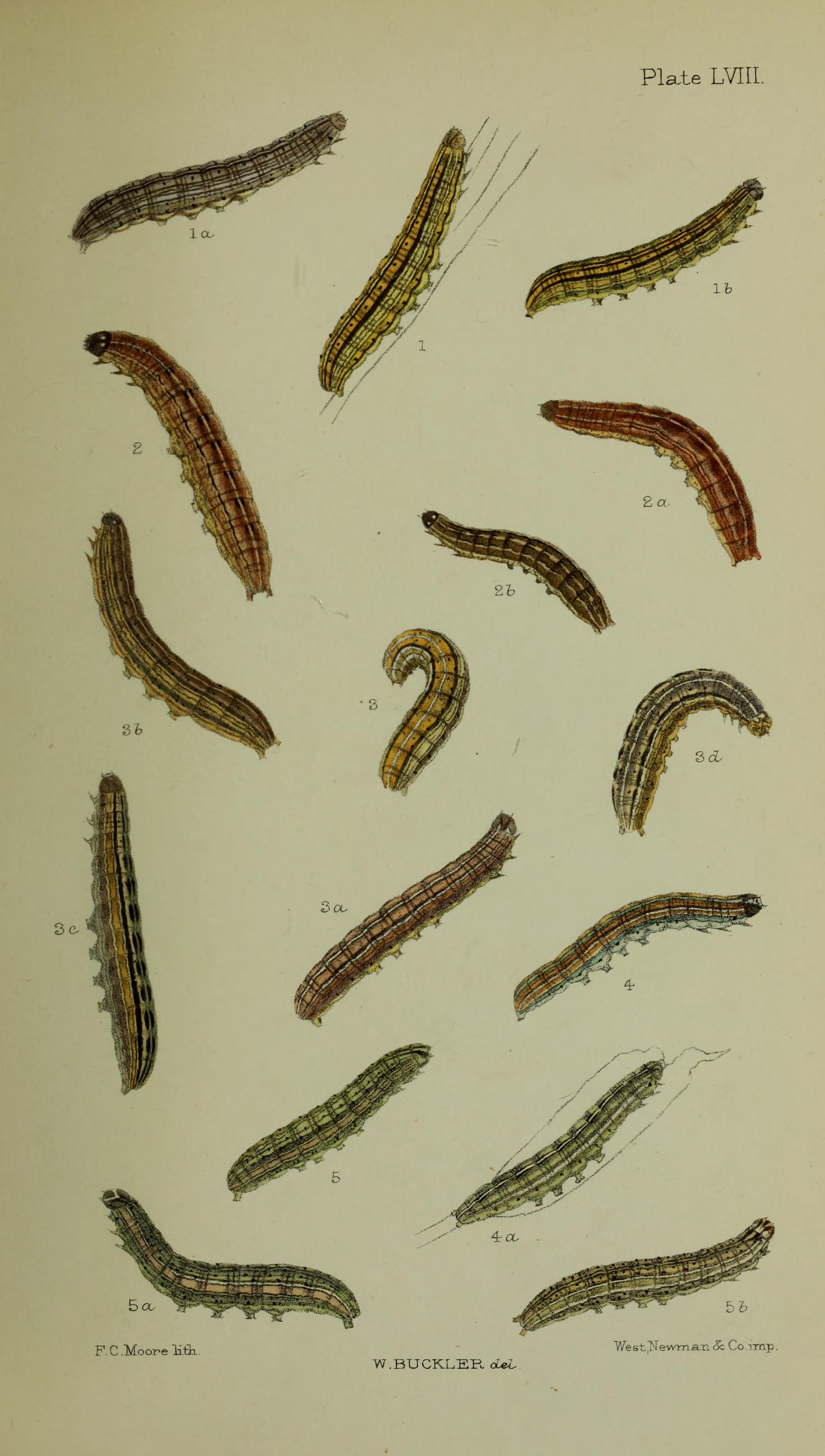
Figs 4, 4a larvae after final moult

The larvae feed on Phragmites species.

== Notes ==
1. The flight season refers to Belgium and the Netherlands. This may vary in other parts of the range.
