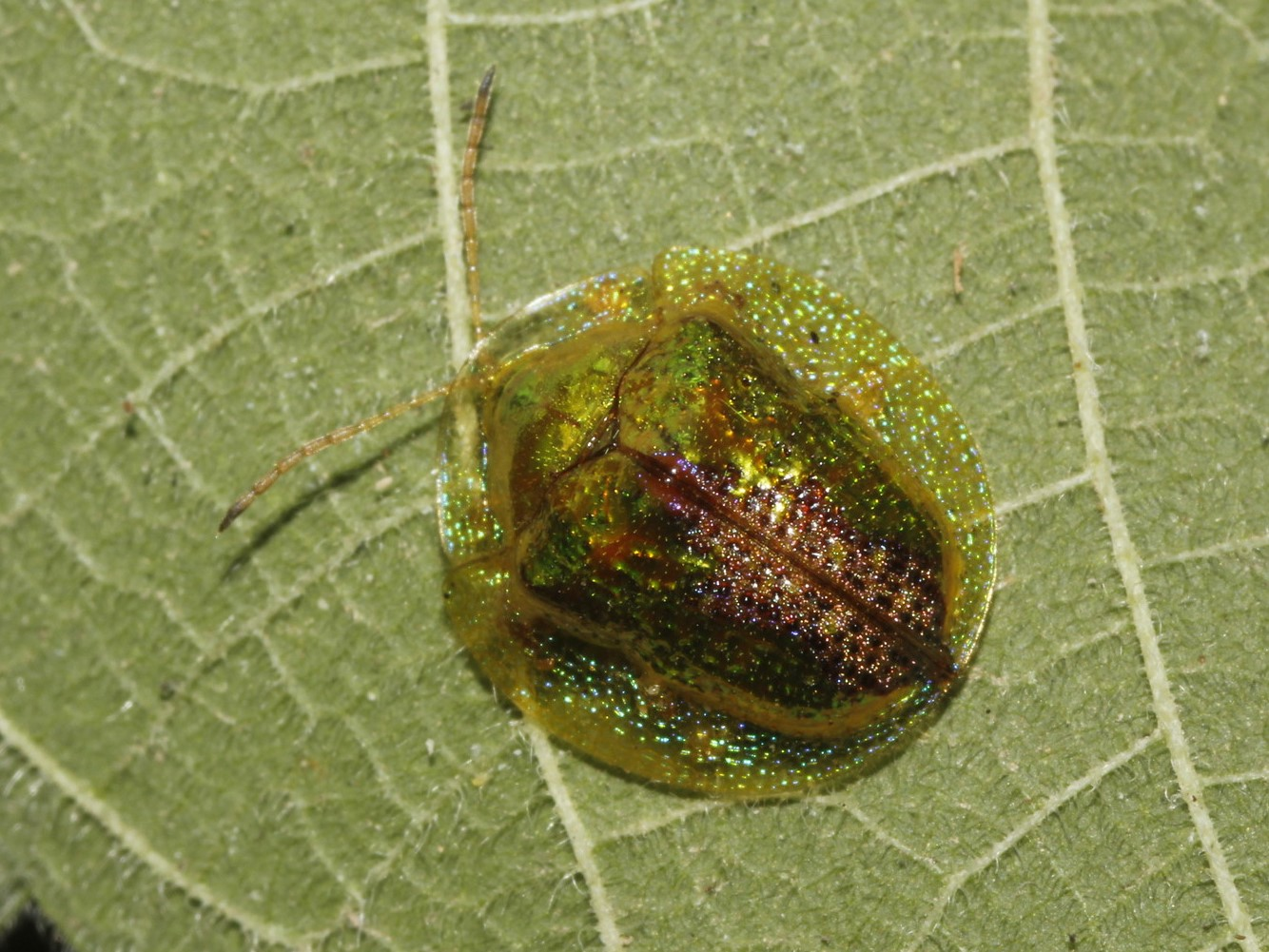

Scientific classification
- Kingdom: Animalia
- Phylum: Arthropoda
- Clade: Pancrustacea
- Class: Insecta
- Order: Coleoptera
- Suborder: Polyphaga
- Infraorder: Cucujiformia
- Family: Chrysomelidae
- Genus: Coptocycla
- Species: C. texana

Binomial name
- Coptocycla texana (Schaeffer, 1933)

= Coptocycla texana =

Species of beetle

Coptocycla texana, the anacua tortoise beetle, is a species of tortoise beetle in the family Chrysomelidae. It is found in Central America and North America.

This monophagous beetle feeds entirely on the leaves of the anacua (Ehretia anacua).
