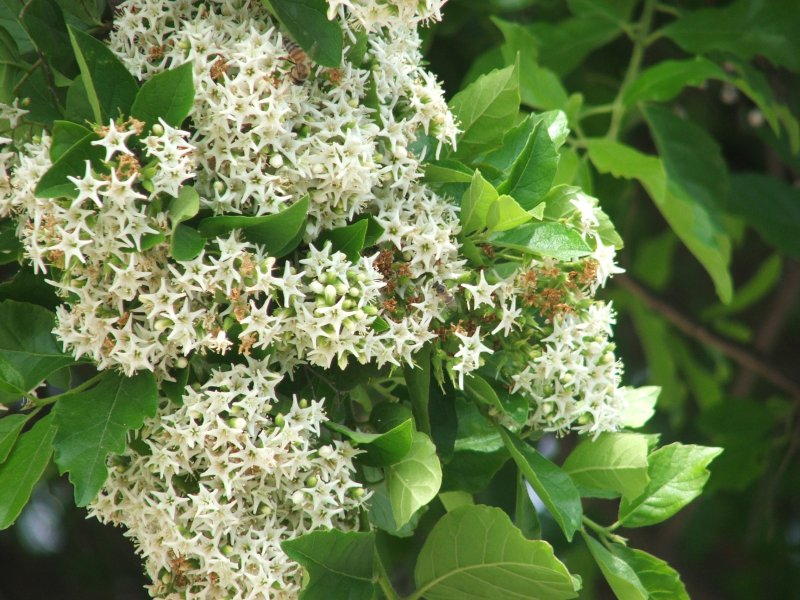

Scientific classification
- Kingdom: Plantae
- Clade: Embryophytes
- Clade: Tracheophytes
- Clade: Spermatophytes
- Clade: Angiosperms
- Clade: Eudicots
- Clade: Asterids
- Order: Boraginales
- Family: Ehretiaceae
- Genus: Ehretia
- Species: E. anacua

Binomial name
- Ehretia anacua (Terán & Berland.) I.M.Johnst.
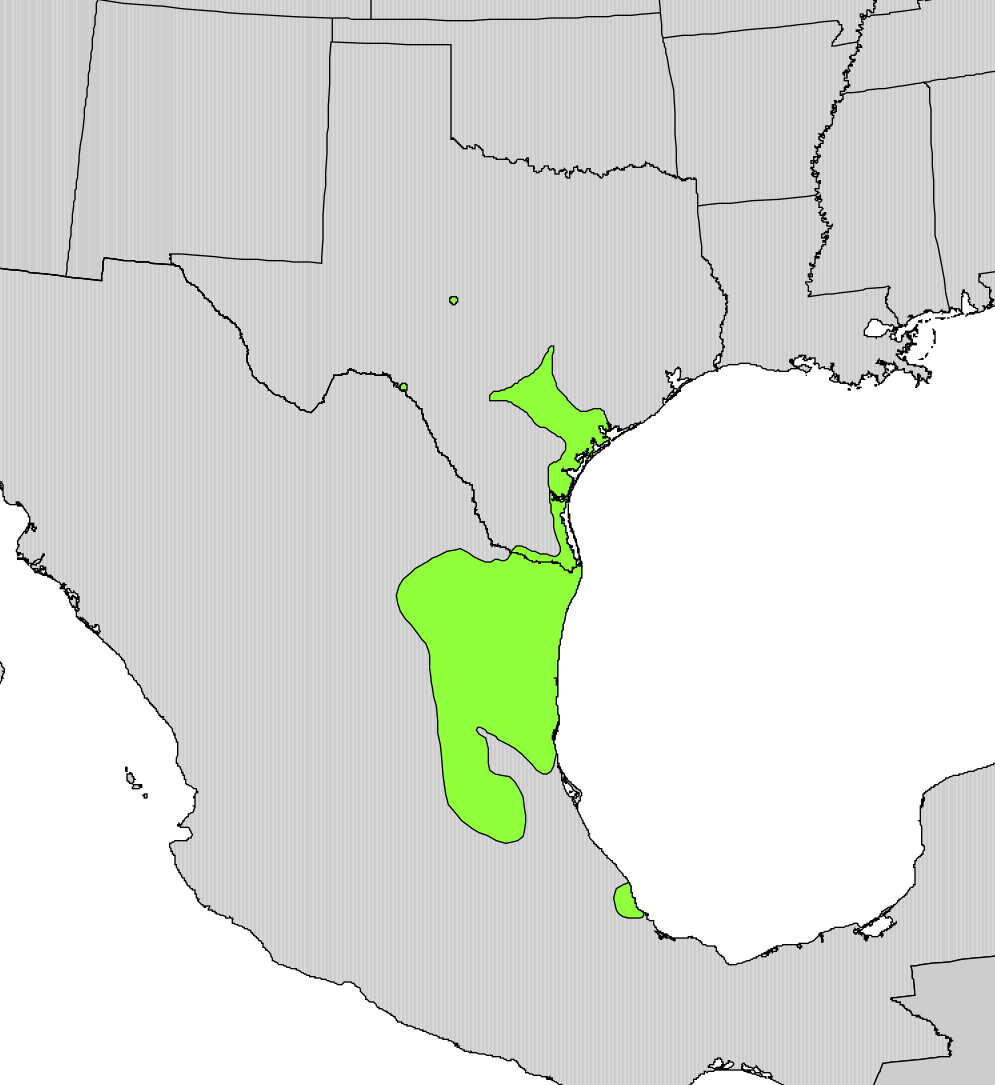
- Natural range

Synonyms
- Ehretia elliptica DC. Gaza anacua Terán & Berland.

= Ehretia anacua =

Species of tree

Ehretia anacua is medium-sized tree found in eastern Mexico and southern Texas in the United States. It is a member of the family Ehretiaceae. One of its common names, anacua, is derived from the Mexican Spanish word anacahuite, as is that of the related Cordia boissieri, the anacahuita. That word in turn is derived from the Nahuatl words āmatl, meaning "paper," and cuahuitl, meaning "tree," possibly referring to the bark. It is also known as knockaway, a corruption of anacua, and sandpaper tree. Alternate spellings are anaqua and anachua.

== Description ==
Anacua reaches a height of 6–14 m (20–45 ft) and a diameter of 0.3 m (1 ft), often producing suckers or multiple trunks. The bark is reddish-brown to gray with narrow furrows and peeling scales. The dark green leaves are 3–8 cm (1.2–3.1 in) and 2–4 cm (0.79–1.57 in) wide and elliptical or ovate. Their upper surfaces are remarkably rough, feeling like low-grade sandpaper. Anacua is a partial evergreen, replacing some of the leaves in early spring. Abundant white flowers form in panicles or cymes 5–7.5 cm (2.0–3.0 in) in length at the ends of twigs, making trees appear to be covered in snow when in bloom from spring to summer. Flowers are 8 mm (0.31 in) wide and have 5 corolla lobes. The fruits are spherical drupes 8 mm in diameter and yellowish-orange. The drupes contain two stones, each with two seeds. In addition to being edible by humans, the drupes are eaten by mammals and birds such as the clay-colored thrush. The lifespan of an Anacua is at least 50 years.

== Habitat ==
Anacua is found on dry hillsides as a shrub, but reaches tree size in the moist soils of riparian zones and floodplains. It can be found at elevations from sea level to 1,000 ft (300 m).

== Ecology ==
The leaves of E. anacua are the sole food source of the Texas tortoise beetle (Coptocycla texana).
