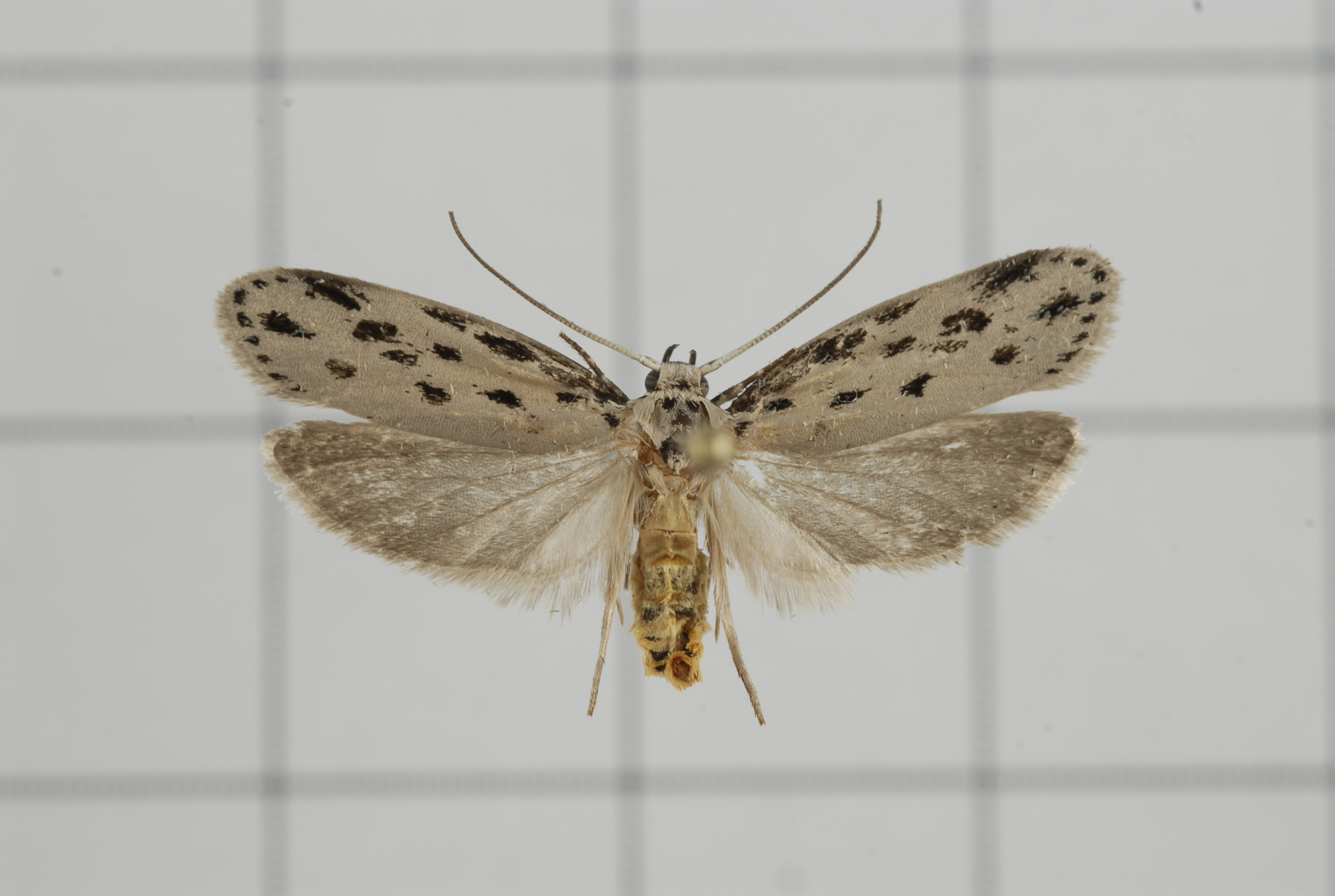

Scientific classification
- Kingdom: Animalia
- Phylum: Arthropoda
- Class: Insecta
- Order: Lepidoptera
- Family: Depressariidae
- Genus: Ethmia
- Species: E. crocosoma

Binomial name
- Ethmia crocosoma Meyrick, 1914

= Ethmia crocosoma =

Species of moth

Ethmia crocosoma is a moth in the family Depressariidae. It is found in India and Nepal. Records for Taiwan are probably based on misidentifications.

The wingspan is 24–35 mm (0.94–1.38 in).
