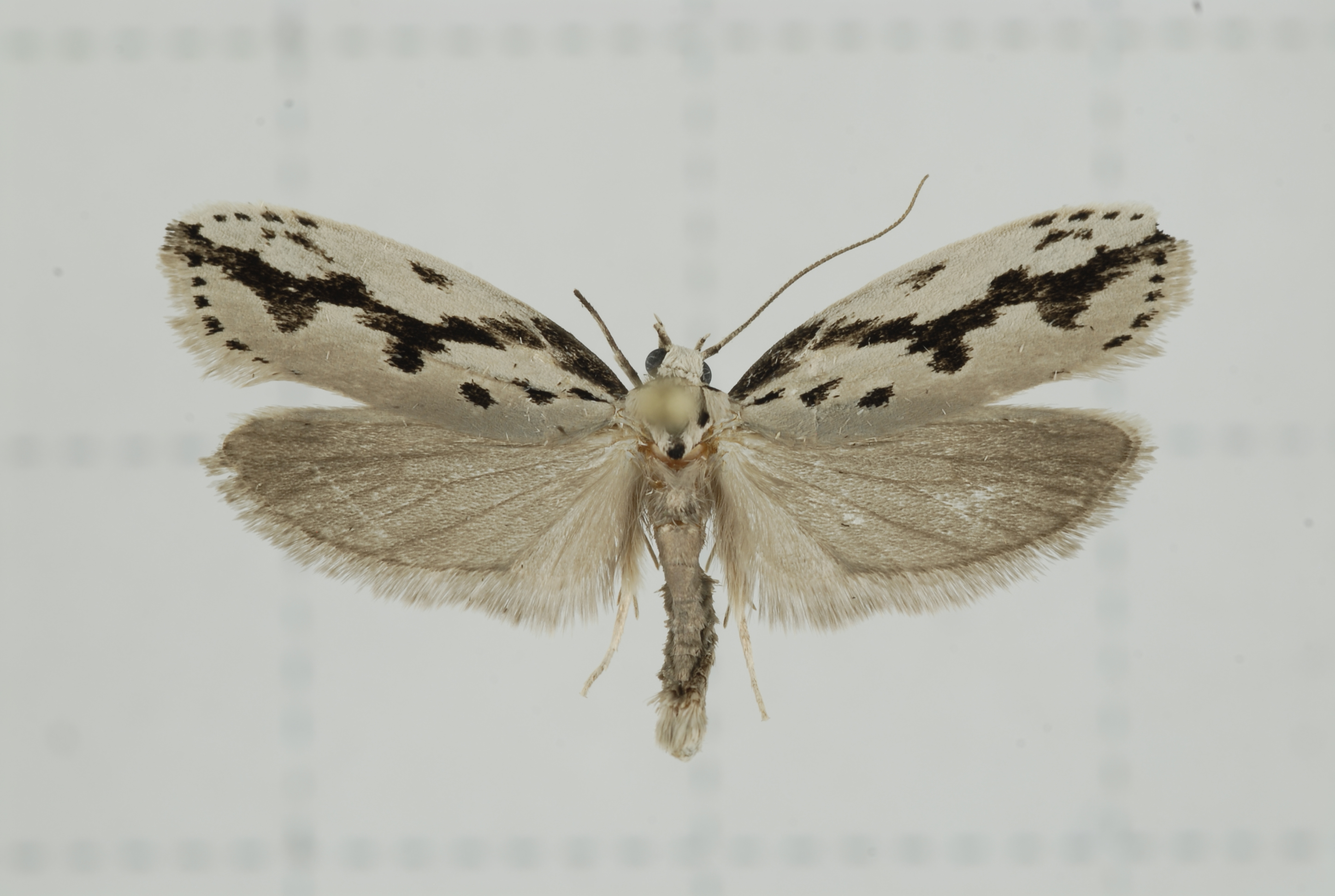

Scientific classification
- Kingdom: Animalia
- Phylum: Arthropoda
- Class: Insecta
- Order: Lepidoptera
- Family: Depressariidae
- Genus: Ethmia
- Species: E. zygospila

Binomial name
- Ethmia zygospila Meyrick, 1934

= Ethmia zygospila =

Species of moth

Ethmia zygospila is a moth in the family Depressariidae. It is found in Taiwan.
