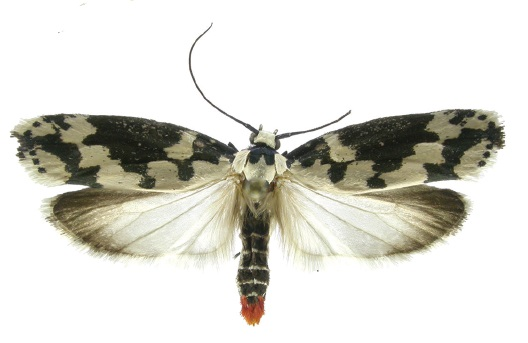

Scientific classification
- Kingdom: Animalia
- Phylum: Arthropoda
- Clade: Pancrustacea
- Class: Insecta
- Order: Lepidoptera
- Family: Depressariidae
- Genus: Ethmia
- Species: E. stephenrumseyi

Binomial name
- Ethmia stephenrumseyi Phillips, 2014

= Ethmia stephenrumseyi =

Species of moth

Ethmia stephenrumseyi is a moth in the family Depressariidae. It is found in Costa Rica, where it has been recorded from most of the country at altitudes ranging from 660 to 1,250 meters (2,170 to 4,100 ft).

The length of the forewings is 12.1–15.8 mm (0.48–0.62 in) for males and 13.4–16.3 mm (0.53–0.64 in) for females. The ground color of the forewings is white with well defined black markings. There is an elongated blotch at costal half, interrupted by a white patch. There is a short oblique band in the terminal area and a broad oblique irregular band from the middle of forewing, reaching the posterior margin. The hindwing ground colour is whitish, becoming dark grey towards the apex.

== Etymology ==
The species is named in honor of Stephen Rumsey for his use of forest conservation and recuperation to reverse climate alteration by humans and to increase biodiversity in the wild.
