= Ethmia duplicata =

Scientific classification
- Kingdom: Animalia
- Phylum: Arthropoda
- Class: Insecta
- Order: Lepidoptera
- Family: Depressariidae
- Genus: Ethmia
- Species: E. duplicata

Binomial name
- Ethmia duplicata Meyrick, 1914

Species of moth

Ethmia duplicata is a moth in the family Depressariidae. It was described by Edward Meyrick in 1914. It is found in Sri Lanka.

The wingspan is 30–32 mm (1.2–1.3 in). Adults are very similar to Ethmia hilarella, but can be distinguished by the absence of dorsal spots on the two basal segments of the abdomen, and the reduced or absent spots on the third segment. The hindwings in both sexes are as the hindwings of the female of E. hilarella, but with the apical patch wider and much more convex anteriorly, less produced beneath and not reaching the middle of the termen and the grey apical patch in the cilia is also reduced and does not reach the middle of the termen.
