= Ethmia hilarella =

Scientific classification
- Kingdom: Animalia
- Phylum: Arthropoda
- Class: Insecta
- Order: Lepidoptera
- Family: Depressariidae
- Genus: Ethmia
- Species: E. hilarella

Binomial name
- Ethmia hilarella (Walker, 1863)

Synonyms
- Azinis hilarella Walker, 1863; Theoxenia penicillata Walsingham, [1887]

Species of moth

Ethmia hilarella is a moth in the family Depressariidae. It was described by Francis Walker in 1863. It is found in Sri Lanka, southern India and Taiwan.

Adults are pale slate grey, the forewings with eighteen black whitish-bordered dots and with a row of small submarginal black dots. The hindwings are luteous, but black at the tips.
