= Ethmia scutula =

Scientific classification
- Kingdom: Animalia
- Phylum: Arthropoda
- Clade: Pancrustacea
- Class: Insecta
- Order: Lepidoptera
- Family: Depressariidae
- Genus: Ethmia
- Species: E. scutula

Binomial name
- Ethmia scutula Powell, 1973

Species of insect

Ethmia scutula is a moth in the family Depressariidae. It is found along the west coast of Mexico.

The length of the forewings is 7.7–8.4 mm (0.30–0.33 in). The pattern on the forewings is as in Ethmia penthica, but tends to be less distinct in the apical and tornal areas owing to an infusion of brown in pale areas. The ground color of the hindwings is dark brown.
