= Ethmia penthica =

Scientific classification
- Domain: Eukaryota
- Kingdom: Animalia
- Phylum: Arthropoda
- Class: Insecta
- Order: Lepidoptera
- Family: Depressariidae
- Genus: Ethmia
- Species: E. penthica

Binomial name
- Ethmia penthica Walsingham, 1912

Species of moth

Ethmia penthica is a moth in the family Depressariidae. It is found in southern Mexico.

The length of the forewings is 8–9.9 mm (0.31–0.39 in). The pattern of the forewings is divided by a sinuate (wavy) line, forming three broad, triangulate to nearly U-shaped projections of costal brown into the white ground color. The ground color of the hindwings is dark brown, but whitish inside the fold. Adults are on wing from late June to August.
