= Ethmia sphenisca =

Scientific classification
- Kingdom: Animalia
- Phylum: Arthropoda
- Clade: Pancrustacea
- Class: Insecta
- Order: Lepidoptera
- Family: Depressariidae
- Genus: Ethmia
- Species: E. sphenisca

Binomial name
- Ethmia sphenisca Powell, 1973

Species of moth

Ethmia sphenisca is a moth in the family Depressariidae. It is found in North America in the high mountains of Arizona and north-western and central Mexico.

The length of the forewings is 10–13 mm (0.39–0.51 in). The ground color of the forewings is divided by a sinuate (wavy) longitudinal line running from the base to the termen. The dorsal area below this line is narrowly white, sending a pointed projection to the Cu fold at the basal one-fourth and another beyond the Cu at the end of the cell, each projection containing a conspicuous black spot. The remainder of the wing costad of the longitudinal line is brownish black or black, only slightly paler toward the costa. The ground color of the hindwings is whitish gray, becoming slightly darker distally.
