= Ethmia julia =

Scientific classification
- Kingdom: Animalia
- Phylum: Arthropoda
- Clade: Pancrustacea
- Class: Insecta
- Order: Lepidoptera
- Family: Depressariidae
- Genus: Ethmia
- Species: E. julia

Binomial name
- Ethmia julia Powell, 1973

Species of moth

Ethmia julia is a moth in the family Depressariidae. It is found in Puerto Rico and the Florida Keys.

The length of the forewings is 5.6–6.4 mm (0.22–0.25 in). The ground color of the forewings is white, tinged with pale brownish gray in the costal area, more broadly so towards the end of the cell and less conspicuously so over the remainder of the wing, or evenly over the whole wing. The markings are round, blackish dots which are more or less uniform in size. The ground color of the hindwings is translucent white, becoming brownish distally.
