= Ethmia pericentrota =

Scientific classification
- Kingdom: Animalia
- Phylum: Arthropoda
- Class: Insecta
- Order: Lepidoptera
- Family: Depressariidae
- Genus: Ethmia
- Species: E. pericentrota

Binomial name
- Ethmia pericentrota Meyrick, 1926

Species of moth

Ethmia pericentrota is a moth in the family Depressariidae. It is found in South Africa.

The wingspan is 15–16 mm (0.59–0.63 in). The forewings are ochreous-white with the costal edge black towards the base and with a large black dot near the base in the middle. The stigmata forms small round black spots, with the plical rather obliquely before the first discal, an additional spot is found midway between the plical and the base and there is a marginal series of about nine rather large irregular black dots around the posterior part of the costa and termen. The hindwings are light grey.
