= Ethmia confusellastra =

Scientific classification
- Kingdom: Animalia
- Phylum: Arthropoda
- Clade: Pancrustacea
- Class: Insecta
- Order: Lepidoptera
- Family: Depressariidae
- Genus: Ethmia
- Species: E. confusellastra

Binomial name
- Ethmia confusellastra Powell, 1973

Species of moth

Ethmia confusellastra is a moth in the family Depressariidae. It is found on the Yucatan Peninsula and Cuba.

The length of the forewings is 7–7.7 mm (0.28–0.30 in). The ground color of the forewings is white, generally somewhat infused with pale grayish. The markings are brownish gray. The ground color of the hindwings is white and semitranslucent, becoming brownish at the distal margins.
