= Ethmia infelix =

Scientific classification
- Kingdom: Animalia
- Phylum: Arthropoda
- Class: Insecta
- Order: Lepidoptera
- Family: Depressariidae
- Genus: Ethmia
- Species: E. infelix

Binomial name
- Ethmia infelix Meyrick, 1914

Synonyms
- Psecadia confusella Rebel, 1901 (preocc.); Ethmia kurdistanella Amsel, 1959

Species of moth

Ethmia infelix is a moth in the family Depressariidae. It was described by Edward Meyrick in 1914. It is found in Turkey (Mardin) and northern Iraq (Kurdistan).
