= Ethmia oculimarginata =

Scientific classification
- Domain: Eukaryota
- Kingdom: Animalia
- Phylum: Arthropoda
- Class: Insecta
- Order: Lepidoptera
- Family: Depressariidae
- Genus: Ethmia
- Species: E. oculimarginata

Binomial name
- Ethmia oculimarginata Diakonoff, 1947

Species of moth

Ethmia oculimarginata is a moth in the family Depressariidae. The species is found in Madagascar.
