= Ethmia unilongistriella =

Scientific classification
- Kingdom: Animalia
- Phylum: Arthropoda
- Class: Insecta
- Order: Lepidoptera
- Family: Depressariidae
- Genus: Ethmia
- Species: E. unilongistriella

Binomial name
- Ethmia unilongistriella Capuse, 1981

Species of moth

Ethmia unilongistriella is a moth in the family Depressariidae. It was described by Capuse in 1981. It is found in Cuba.
