= Ethmia coscineutis =

Scientific classification
- Kingdom: Animalia
- Phylum: Arthropoda
- Class: Insecta
- Order: Lepidoptera
- Family: Depressariidae
- Genus: Ethmia
- Species: E. coscineutis

Binomial name
- Ethmia coscineutis Meyrick, 1912

Species of moth

Ethmia coscineutis is a moth in the family Depressariidae. It is found in South Africa.
