= Ethmia glandifera =

Scientific classification
- Kingdom: Animalia
- Phylum: Arthropoda
- Class: Insecta
- Order: Lepidoptera
- Family: Depressariidae
- Genus: Ethmia
- Species: E. glandifera

Binomial name
- Ethmia glandifera Meyrick, 1918

Species of moth

Ethmia glandifera is a moth in the family Depressariidae. It is found in South Africa.
