= Ethmia pylorella =

Scientific classification
- Kingdom: Animalia
- Phylum: Arthropoda
- Class: Insecta
- Order: Lepidoptera
- Family: Depressariidae
- Genus: Ethmia
- Species: E. pylorella

Binomial name
- Ethmia pylorella Viette, 1956

Species of moth

Ethmia pylorella is a moth in the family Depressariidae. It is found in Madagascar.
