= A. agrestis =

A. agrestis may refer to:

- Achlidon agrestis, a crab species
- Amynthas agrestis, a worm species
- Anthoceros agrestis, a bryophyte species
- Antiblemma agrestis, a moth species
- Astragalus agrestis, a flowering plant species
- Austrodrillia agrestis, a sea snail species
- Auximobasis agrestis, a moth species

== Synonyms ==
- Agoseris agrestis, a synonym of Agoseris glauca, a flowering plant species
- Alopecurus agrestis, a synonym of Alopecurus creticus, a grass species
- Anthemis agrestis, a synonym of Anthemis arvensis, a flowering plant species
