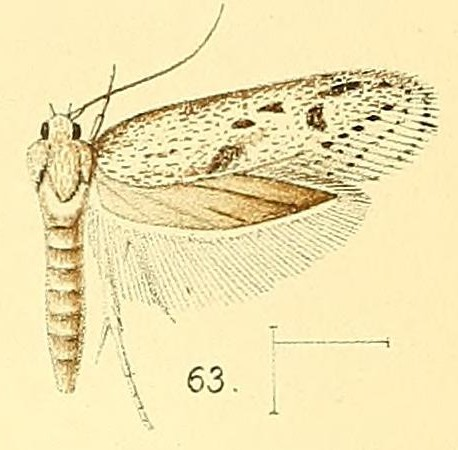
- Holcocera irroratella

Scientific classification
- Kingdom: Animalia
- Phylum: Arthropoda
- Clade: Pancrustacea
- Class: Insecta
- Order: Lepidoptera
- Family: Blastobasidae
- Subfamily: Holcocerinae
- Genus: Holcocera; Clemens, 1863

Species
- Several, see text

Synonyms
- Catacrypsis Walsingham, 1907; Catacrypris Dietz, 1910; Cynotes Walsingham, 1907; Eubolepia Dietz, 1910; Hypatima Herrich-Schäffer, 1853; Prosodica Walsingham, 1907; Prorodica Dietz, 1910; Syndroma Meyrick, 1914

= Holcocera =

Moth genus in family Blastobasidae

Holcocera is a gelechoid moth genus of the family Blastobasidae. There are about 70 described species.

== Taxonomy ==
The genera Hypatopa and Calosima are sometimes treated as synonyms of Holcocera.

=== Species ===
- Holcocera aclydis
- Holcocera adjutrix Meyrick, 1918
- Holcocera amicae
- Holcocera amicitiae
- Holcocera anomalella
- Holcocera arcae
- Holcocera audaciae
- Holcocera aurorae
- Holcocera basiplagata Walsingham, 1912
- Holcocera bucinae
- Holcocera calthae
- Holcocera cathedrae
- Holcocera cerradicola
- Holcocera chalcofrontella
- Holcocera chloropeda Meyrick, 1922
- Holcocera coccivorella
- Holcocera concolor
- Holcocera crassicornella
- Holcocera cryptae
- Holcocera cylindrota Meyrick, 1918
- Holcocera digesta Meyrick, 1922
- Holcocera dominae
- Holcocera epitomae
- Holcocera eusaris Meyrick, 1922
- Holcocera extensa
- Holcocera famae
- Holcocera fergusoni Adamski, 2004
- Holcocera fugae
- Holcocera gargantuella
- Holcocera gigantella
- Holcocera gozmanyi Adamski & Landry, 2007
- Holcocera grenadensis
- Holcocera guilandinae
- Holcocera hemiteles Walsingham, 1912
- Holcocera homochromatica Walsingham, 1912
- Holcocera ianuae
- Holcocera iceryaeella
- Holcocera immaculella
- Holcocera increta Meyrick, 1930
- Holcocera irroratella
- Holcocera iubae
- Holcocera laudis
- Holcocera lignyodes
- Holcocera limicola Meyrick, 1922
- Holcocera luxuriae
- Holcocera lyrae
- Holcocera macrotoma Meyrick, 1916
- Holcocera mortis
- Holcocera musicae
- Holcocera nephalia Walsingham, 1912
- Holcocera notae
- Holcocera nuptae
- Holcocera panurgella
- Holcocera paradoxa
- Holcocera percnoscia Meyrick, 1932
- Holcocera piratae
- Holcocera plagatola
- Holcocera poetae
- Holcocera portae
- Holcocera puellae
- Holcocera pugionaria Meyrick, 1918
- Holcocera sakura Ohshima, 2003
- Holcocera sollertiae
- Holcocera subolivacea (Walsingham, 1897)
- Holcocera sympasta Meyrick, 1918
- Holcocera titanica Walsingham, 1912
- Holcocera villella
- Holcocera zonae

=== Former species ===
- Holcocera anthracographa Meyrick, 1937
- Holcocera aphanes (Zeller, 1877)
- Holcocera controversella (Zeller, 1877)
- Holcocera orthophrontis Meyrick, 1932
- Holcocera proagorella (Zeller, 1877)
- Holcocera suppletella (Zeller, 1877)
