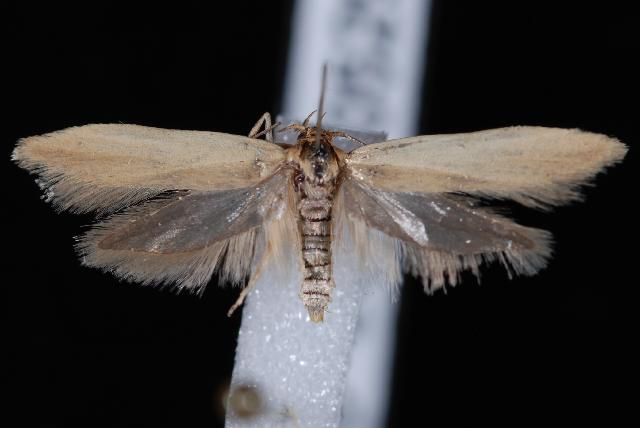

Scientific classification
- Domain: Eukaryota
- Kingdom: Animalia
- Phylum: Arthropoda
- Class: Insecta
- Order: Lepidoptera
- Family: Blastobasidae
- Genus: Holcocera
- Species: H. immaculella

Binomial name
- Holcocera immaculella McDunnough, 1930

= Holcocera immaculella =

Species of moth

Holcocera immaculella is a moth in the family Blastobasidae. It is found in North America and Canada, including Ontario, Quebec, Alabama, Arizona, British Columbia, Florida, Maine, Manitoba, Massachusetts, Minnesota, New Brunswick, New York and Tennessee.

The larvae feed on the seeds of Picea species.
