= Holcocera plagatola =

Scientific classification
- Kingdom: Animalia
- Phylum: Arthropoda
- Clade: Pancrustacea
- Class: Insecta
- Order: Lepidoptera
- Family: Blastobasidae
- Genus: Holcocera
- Species: H. plagatola

Binomial name
- Holcocera plagatola Adamski, 2009

Species of moth

Holcocera plagatola is a moth in the family Blastobasidae. It is found in Guatemala.

The length of the forewings is 9.5–9.7 mm.
