= Calosima arguta =

Scientific classification
- Kingdom: Animalia
- Phylum: Arthropoda
- Clade: Pancrustacea
- Class: Insecta
- Order: Lepidoptera
- Family: Blastobasidae
- Genus: Calosima
- Species: C. arguta

Binomial name
- Calosima arguta (Meyrick, 1918): Blastobasis arguta Meyrick, 1918; Zenodochium arguta

Species of moth

Calosima arguta is a moth in the family Blastobasidae. It is found in South Africa.

The length of the forewings is 6.7–7 mm.
