= Holcocera pugionaria =

Scientific classification
- Kingdom: Animalia
- Phylum: Arthropoda
- Clade: Pancrustacea
- Class: Insecta
- Order: Lepidoptera
- Family: Blastobasidae
- Genus: Holcocera
- Species: H. pugionaria

Binomial name
- Holcocera pugionaria Meyrick, 1918

Species of moth

Holcocera pugionaria is a species of moth in the family Blastobasidae. It was described by Edward Meyrick in 1918. It is found in Guyana.
