= Auximobasis persimilella =

Scientific classification
- Domain: Eukaryota
- Kingdom: Animalia
- Phylum: Arthropoda
- Class: Insecta
- Order: Lepidoptera
- Family: Blastobasidae
- Genus: Auximobasis
- Species: A. persimilella

Binomial name
- Auximobasis persimilella Walsingham, 1891

Synonyms
- Blastobasis persimilella

Species of moth

Auximobasis persimilella is a moth in the family Blastobasidae. It was described by Walsingham in 1891. It is found in the West Indies.
