= Calosima argyrosplendella =

Scientific classification
- Kingdom: Animalia
- Phylum: Arthropoda
- Clade: Pancrustacea
- Class: Insecta
- Order: Lepidoptera
- Family: Blastobasidae
- Genus: Calosima
- Species: C. argyrosplendella

Binomial name
- Calosima argyrosplendella Dietz, 1910

Species of moth

Calosima argyrosplendella is a species of moth in the family Blastobasidae. It is found in the United States, including Maryland, Pennsylvania, Louisiana, Florida, Maine and West Virginia.
