= Holcocera sympasta =

Scientific classification
- Kingdom: Animalia
- Phylum: Arthropoda
- Class: Insecta
- Order: Lepidoptera
- Family: Blastobasidae
- Genus: Holcocera
- Species: H. sympasta

Binomial name
- Holcocera sympasta Meyrick, 1918

Species of moth

Holcocera sympasta is a moth in the family Blastobasidae. It was described by Edward Meyrick in 1918. It is found in Peru.
