= Auximobasis insularis =

Scientific classification
- Domain: Eukaryota
- Kingdom: Animalia
- Phylum: Arthropoda
- Class: Insecta
- Order: Lepidoptera
- Family: Blastobasidae
- Genus: Auximobasis
- Species: A. insularis

Binomial name
- Auximobasis insularis Walsingham, 1897

Species of moth

Auximobasis insularis is a moth in the family Blastobasidae. It was described by Lord Walsingham in 1897. It is found in the West Indies.

== Taxonomy ==
The name insularis is preoccupied by Asychna insularis described by Thomas Vernon Wollaston in 1858.
