= Tecmerium anthophaga =

Scientific classification
- Domain: Eukaryota
- Kingdom: Animalia
- Phylum: Arthropoda
- Class: Insecta
- Order: Lepidoptera
- Family: Blastobasidae
- Genus: Tecmerium
- Species: T. anthophaga

Binomial name
- Tecmerium anthophaga (Staudinger, 1870)

Synonyms
- Blastobasis anthophaga Staudinger, 1870; Tecmerium anthophagum; Blastobasis stoechadella Constant, 1885; Symmoca staechadella Constant, 1885

Species of moth

Tecmerium anthophaga is a moth in the family Blastobasidae. It is found in France, Portugal and Spain, as well as on Corsica and Sardinia.

The wingspan is 14–16 mm.
