= Barbaloba jubae =

Scientific classification
- Kingdom: Animalia
- Phylum: Arthropoda
- Clade: Pancrustacea
- Class: Insecta
- Order: Lepidoptera
- Family: Blastobasidae
- Genus: Barbaloba
- Species: B. jubae

Binomial name
- Barbaloba jubae Adamski, 2013

Species of moth

Barbaloba jubae is a moth in the family Blastobasidae. It is found in Costa Rica.

The length of the forewings is 5.6–6 mm.
