= Auximobasis tarachodes =

Scientific classification
- Domain: Eukaryota
- Kingdom: Animalia
- Phylum: Arthropoda
- Class: Insecta
- Order: Lepidoptera
- Family: Blastobasidae
- Genus: Auximobasis
- Species: A. tarachodes

Binomial name
- Auximobasis tarachodes (Walsingham, 1912)

Synonyms
- Valentinia tarachodes Walsingham, 1912; Blastobasis tarachodes

Species of moth

Auximobasis tarachodes is a moth in the family Blastobasidae. It was described by Walsingham in 1912. It is found in Central America.
