= Auximobasis flavida =

Scientific classification
- Kingdom: Animalia
- Phylum: Arthropoda
- Class: Insecta
- Order: Lepidoptera
- Family: Blastobasidae
- Genus: Auximobasis
- Species: A. flavida

Binomial name
- Auximobasis flavida Meyrick, 1922

Synonyms
- Blastobasis flavida

Species of moth

Auximobasis flavida is a moth in the family Blastobasidae. It was described by Edward Meyrick in 1922. It is found in Peru and Pará, Brazil.
