= Holcocera grenadensis =

Scientific classification
- Domain: Eukaryota
- Kingdom: Animalia
- Phylum: Arthropoda
- Class: Insecta
- Order: Lepidoptera
- Family: Blastobasidae
- Genus: Holcocera
- Species: H. grenadensis

Binomial name
- Holcocera grenadensis (Walsingham, 1897)

Synonyms
- Blastobasis grenadensis Walsingham, 1897

Species of moth

Holcocera grenadensis is a moth in the family Blastobasidae. It is found on the Caribbean islands of Grenada and Dominica.

The length of the forewings is 5.9-6.2 mm. The ground color of the forewings is brown intermixed with pale-brown scales, irregularly streaked with pale greyish-brown scales above the veins. The hindwing dorsal and ventral surfaces are uniformly brownish grey, darkening to the outer margin.
