= Pseudohypatopa paulilobata =

Scientific classification
- Domain: Eukaryota
- Kingdom: Animalia
- Phylum: Arthropoda
- Class: Insecta
- Order: Lepidoptera
- Family: Blastobasidae
- Genus: Pseudohypatopa
- Species: P. paulilobata

Binomial name
- Pseudohypatopa paulilobata H. Zhen & H.H. Li, 2008

Species of moth

Pseudohypatopa paulilobata is a moth in the family Blastobasidae. It was described by H. Zhen and H.H. Li in 2008. It is found in China (Zhejiang).
