= Auximobasis =

Scientific classification
- Kingdom: Animalia
- Phylum: Arthropoda
- Clade: Pancrustacea
- Class: Insecta
- Order: Lepidoptera
- Family: Blastobasidae
- Subfamily: Blastobasinae
- Tribe: Blastobasini
- Genus: Auximobasis; Walsingham, 1892

Synonyms
- Valentinia Walsingham, 1907

Moth genus in family Blastobasidae

Auximobasis is a genus of the gelechioid moth family Blastobasidae. It is sometimes included in Blastobasis.

== Species ==
- Auximobasis normalis Meyrick, 1918
- Auximobasis administra Meyrick, 1922
- Auximobasis agrestis Meyrick, 1922
- Auximobasis angusta Meyrick, 1922
- Auximobasis brevipalpella Walsingham, 1897
- Auximobasis bromeliae Walsingham, 1912
- Auximobasis coffeaella Busck, 1925
- Auximobasis confectella Zeller, 1873
- Auximobasis constans Walsingham, 1897
- Auximobasis flaviciliata Walsingham, 1897
- Auximobasis flavida Meyrick, 1922
- Auximobasis floridella Dietz, 1910
- Auximobasis fractilinea Zeller, 1873
- Auximobasis glandulella Riley, 1871
- Auximobasis incretata Meyrick, 1931
- Auximobasis insularis Walsingham, 1897
- Auximobasis invigorata Meyrick, 1932
- Auximobasis liberatella Walker, 1864
- Auximobasis neptes Walsingham, 1912
- Auximobasis nothrotes Walsingham, 1907
- Auximobasis obstricta Meyrick, 1918
- Auximobasis persimilella Walsingham, 1891
- Auximobasis prolixa Meyrick, 1922
- Auximobasis quaintancella Dietz, 1910
- Auximobasis repartella Dietz, 1910
- Auximobasis retectella Zeller, 1873
- Auximobasis tarachodes Walsingham, 1912
- Auximobasis variolata Walsingham, 1897
