= Holcocera percnoscia =

Scientific classification
- Kingdom: Animalia
- Phylum: Arthropoda
- Class: Insecta
- Order: Lepidoptera
- Family: Blastobasidae
- Genus: Holcocera
- Species: H. percnoscia

Binomial name
- Holcocera percnoscia Meyrick, 1932

Species of moth

Holcocera percnoscia is a moth in the family Blastobasidae. It was described by Edward Meyrick in 1932. It is found in Brazil.
