= Holcocera adjutrix =

Scientific classification
- Domain: Eukaryota
- Kingdom: Animalia
- Phylum: Arthropoda
- Class: Insecta
- Order: Lepidoptera
- Family: Blastobasidae
- Genus: Holcocera
- Species: H. adjutrix

Binomial name
- Holcocera adjutrix Meyrick, 1918

Species of moth

Holcocera adjutrix is a moth in the family Blastobasidae. It was described by Edward Meyrick in 1918. It is found in Guyana.
