= Pseudohypatopa pulverea =

Scientific classification
- Kingdom: Animalia
- Phylum: Arthropoda
- Class: Insecta
- Order: Lepidoptera
- Family: Blastobasidae
- Genus: Pseudohypatopa
- Species: P. pulverea

Binomial name
- Pseudohypatopa pulverea (Meyrick, 1907)

Synonyms
- Blastobasis pulverea Meyrick, 1907

Species of moth

Pseudohypatopa pulverea is a moth in the family Blastobasidae. It is found in India.
