= Tecmerium perplexum =

Scientific classification
- Kingdom: Animalia
- Phylum: Arthropoda
- Clade: Pancrustacea
- Class: Insecta
- Order: Lepidoptera
- Family: Blastobasidae
- Genus: Tecmerium
- Species: T. perplexum

Binomial name
- Tecmerium perplexum (Gozmány, 1957)

Synonyms
- Oroclintrus perplexum Gozmány, 1957

Species of moth

Tecmerium perplexum is a moth in the family Blastobasidae. It is found in Hungary, Slovakia, Greece, Turkey and on Cyprus.
