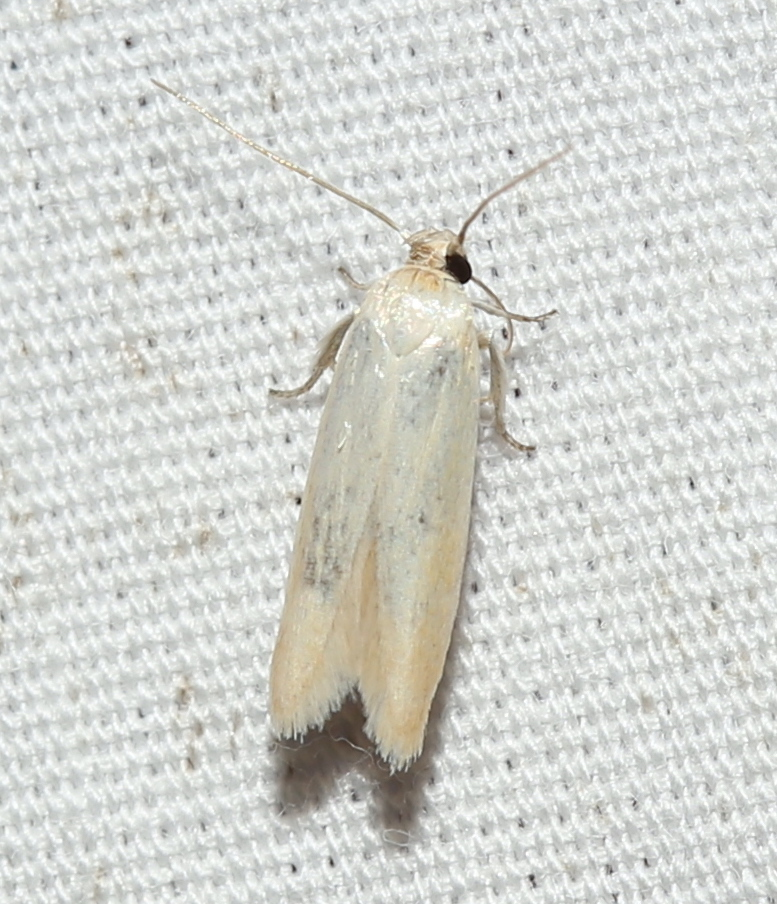

Scientific classification
- Kingdom: Animalia
- Phylum: Arthropoda
- Class: Insecta
- Order: Lepidoptera
- Family: Blastobasidae
- Genus: Calosima
- Species: C. dianella

Binomial name
- Calosima dianella Dietz, 1910

Synonyms
- Holcocera lepidophaga Clarke, 1960; Calosima lepidophaga

= Calosima dianella =

Species of moth

Calosima dianella, the eastern pine catkin borer, is a moth in the family Blastobasidae. It is found in the United States, including Florida, Georgia, South Carolina and Tennessee.

The larvae feed on the catkins of Pinus elliottii.
