= Hallicis bisetosellus =

Scientific classification
- Kingdom: Animalia
- Phylum: Arthropoda
- Clade: Pancrustacea
- Class: Insecta
- Order: Lepidoptera
- Family: Blastobasidae
- Genus: Hallicis
- Species: H. bisetosellus

Binomial name
- Hallicis bisetosellus Adamski, 2013

Species of moth

Hallicis bisetosellus is a moth in the family Blastobasidae. It is found in Costa Rica.

The length of the forewings is 4–5.9 mm.
