= Calosima darwini =

Scientific classification
- Kingdom: Animalia
- Phylum: Arthropoda
- Clade: Pancrustacea
- Class: Insecta
- Order: Lepidoptera
- Family: Blastobasidae
- Genus: Calosima
- Species: C. darwini

Binomial name
- Calosima darwini Adamski & Landry, 1997

Species of moth

Calosima darwini is a moth in the family Blastobasidae. It is found on the Galapagos Islands.

The length of the forewings is 4-6.9 mm.

== Etymology ==
The species is named after Charles Darwin.
