= Holcocera panurgella =

Scientific classification
- Domain: Eukaryota
- Kingdom: Animalia
- Phylum: Arthropoda
- Class: Insecta
- Order: Lepidoptera
- Family: Blastobasidae
- Genus: Holcocera
- Species: H. panurgella

Binomial name
- Holcocera panurgella Heinrich, 1920

Species of moth

Holcocera panurgella is a moth in the family Blastobasidae. It is found in Arizona, United States.

The larvae feed on the seeds of Pinus species.
