= Holcocera lignyodes =

Scientific classification
- Kingdom: Animalia
- Phylum: Arthropoda
- Class: Insecta
- Order: Lepidoptera
- Family: Blastobasidae
- Genus: Holcocera
- Species: H. lignyodes

Binomial name
- Holcocera lignyodes (Meyrick, 1914)

Synonyms
- Syndroma lignyodes Meyrick, 1914

Species of moth

Holcocera lignyodes is a moth in the family Blastobasidae. It is found in Malawi.
