= Holcocera crassicornella =

Scientific classification
- Domain: Eukaryota
- Kingdom: Animalia
- Phylum: Arthropoda
- Class: Insecta
- Order: Lepidoptera
- Family: Blastobasidae
- Genus: Holcocera
- Species: H. crassicornella

Binomial name
- Holcocera crassicornella Dietz, 1910

Synonyms
- Blastobasis eriobotryae Busck, 1915

Species of moth

Holcocera crassicornella is a moth in the family Blastobasidae. It is found in southern Florida.

The length of the forewings is 5.5–7.8 mm.

The larvae feed on the fruit of Eriobotrya japonica and have also been recorded on Acer rubrum.
