= Calosima favillae =

Scientific classification
- Kingdom: Animalia
- Phylum: Arthropoda
- Clade: Pancrustacea
- Class: Insecta
- Order: Lepidoptera
- Family: Blastobasidae
- Genus: Calosima
- Species: C. favillae

Binomial name
- Calosima favillae Adamski, 2002

Species of moth

Calosima favillae is a moth in the family Blastobasidae which is endemic to Costa Rica.
