= Holcocera subolivacea =

Scientific classification
- Domain: Eukaryota
- Kingdom: Animalia
- Phylum: Arthropoda
- Class: Insecta
- Order: Lepidoptera
- Family: Blastobasidae
- Genus: Holcocera
- Species: H. subolivacea

Binomial name
- Holcocera subolivacea (Walsingham, 1897)

Synonyms
- Blastobasis subolivacea Walsingham, 1897

Species of moth

Holcocera subolivacea is a moth in the family Blastobasidae. It was described by Walsingham in 1897. It is found in the West Indies.
