= Auximobasis invigorata =

Scientific classification
- Kingdom: Animalia
- Phylum: Arthropoda
- Class: Insecta
- Order: Lepidoptera
- Family: Blastobasidae
- Genus: Auximobasis
- Species: A. invigorata

Binomial name
- Auximobasis invigorata Meyrick, 1932

Synonyms
- Blastobasis invigorata

Species of moth

Auximobasis invigorata is a moth in the family Blastobasidae. It was described by Edward Meyrick in 1932. It is found on the Virgin Islands.
