= Tecmerium mnemosynella =

Scientific classification
- Domain: Eukaryota
- Kingdom: Animalia
- Phylum: Arthropoda
- Class: Insecta
- Order: Lepidoptera
- Family: Blastobasidae
- Genus: Tecmerium
- Species: T. mnemosynella

Binomial name
- Tecmerium mnemosynella (Millière, 1876)

Synonyms
- Blastobasis mnemosynella Millière, 1876; Tecmerium mnemosynellum

Species of moth

Tecmerium mnemosynella is a moth in the family Blastobasidae. It is found in France.
