= Auximobasis brevipalpella =

Scientific classification
- Domain: Eukaryota
- Kingdom: Animalia
- Phylum: Arthropoda
- Class: Insecta
- Order: Lepidoptera
- Family: Blastobasidae
- Genus: Auximobasis
- Species: A. brevipalpella

Binomial name
- Auximobasis brevipalpella Walsingham, 1897

Synonyms
- Blastobasis brevipalpella

Species of moth

Auximobasis brevipalpella is a moth in the family Blastobasidae. It was described by Walsingham in 1897. It is found in the West Indies.
