= Calosima citharae =

Scientific classification
- Kingdom: Animalia
- Phylum: Arthropoda
- Clade: Pancrustacea
- Class: Insecta
- Order: Lepidoptera
- Family: Blastobasidae
- Genus: Calosima
- Species: C. citharae

Binomial name
- Calosima citharae Adamski, 2002

Species of moth

Calosima citharae is a moth in the family Blastobasidae which is endemic to Costa Rica.
