= Calosima lucidella =

Scientific classification
- Kingdom: Animalia
- Phylum: Arthropoda
- Clade: Pancrustacea
- Class: Insecta
- Order: Lepidoptera
- Family: Blastobasidae
- Genus: Calosima
- Species: C. lucidella

Binomial name
- Calosima lucidella Adamski, 1989

Species of moth

Calosima lucidella is a moth in the family Blastobasidae. It is found in the US state of Florida.
