= Holcocera eusaris =

Scientific classification
- Kingdom: Animalia
- Phylum: Arthropoda
- Class: Insecta
- Order: Lepidoptera
- Family: Blastobasidae
- Genus: Holcocera
- Species: H. eusaris

Binomial name
- Holcocera eusaris Meyrick, 1922

Species of moth

Holcocera eusaris is a moth in the family Blastobasidae. It was described by Edward Meyrick in 1922. It is found in Peru.
