= Holcocera paradoxa =

Scientific classification
- Kingdom: Animalia
- Phylum: Arthropoda
- Clade: Pancrustacea
- Class: Insecta
- Order: Lepidoptera
- Family: Blastobasidae
- Genus: Holcocera
- Species: H. paradoxa

Binomial name
- Holcocera paradoxa Powell, 1976

Species of moth

Holcocera paradoxa is a moth in the family Blastobasidae. It is found in Arizona, United States.

The larvae feed on the seeds and pods of Yucca species, including Yucca schottii.
