= Holcocera concolor =

Scientific classification
- Kingdom: Animalia
- Phylum: Arthropoda
- Clade: Pancrustacea
- Class: Insecta
- Order: Lepidoptera
- Family: Blastobasidae
- Genus: Holcocera
- Species: H. concolor

Binomial name
- Holcocera concolor Adamski & Maier, 2003

Species of moth

Holcocera concolor is a moth in the family Blastobasidae. It is found from Massachusetts north to Nova Scotia and west to British Columbia.

The length of the forewings is 6.9–8.1 millimetres (0.27–0.32 in). The forewings are yellow orange.

Larvae have been reared from several Pinaceae species, including Pinus resinosa, Pinus rigida, Pinus strobus, Picea abies, Picea glauca and Larix species.
