= Holcocera nephalia =

Scientific classification
- Kingdom: Animalia
- Phylum: Arthropoda
- Clade: Pancrustacea
- Class: Insecta
- Order: Lepidoptera
- Family: Blastobasidae
- Genus: Holcocera
- Species: H. nephalia

Binomial name
- Holcocera nephalia Meyrick, 1905

Species of moth

Holcocera nephalia is a species of moth in the family Blastobasidae. It was first described by Edward Meyrick in 1905.

== Description ==
The species has morphological features typical of the genus Holcocera, including narrow forewings and subdued coloration.

== Distribution ==
Holcocera nephalia has been recorded from South Asia.

== Taxonomy ==
The species belongs to the genus Holcocera within the family Blastobasidae, a group of small moths often associated with plant material.
