= Holcocera iceryaeella =

Scientific classification
- Kingdom: Animalia
- Phylum: Arthropoda
- Class: Insecta
- Order: Lepidoptera
- Family: Blastobasidae
- Genus: Holcocera
- Species: H. iceryaeella

Binomial name
- Holcocera iceryaeella (Riley, 1887)

Synonyms
- Blastobasis iceryaeella Riley, 1887; Cynotes iceryaeella; Holcocera phenococci Braun, 1927

Species of moth

Holcocera iceryaeella is a moth in the family Blastobasidae. It is found in California, United States.

The length of the forewings is 9.8–14.1 mm. The forewings are brownish gray intermixed with pale-gray and a few white scales or white intermixed with gray and pale-gray scales. The hindwings are translucent on the basal half, gradually darkening to the margin.

The larvae feed on decaying plant tissue, but have also been recorded as a predator on gregarious Hemiptera. They have been recorded feeding on plant debris of the following plant species: Yucca whipplei, Juniper, Sequoia sempervirens, Quercus agrifolia, Quercus lobata, Persea americana, Medicago arborea, Ficus, Abies concolor, Pinus radiata, Eriogonum parvifilium, Polyporus hirsutus, Heteromeles arbutifolia, Prunus dulcis and Citrus sinensis. Recorded animal hosts are Lepidosaphes camelliae, Icerya purchase, Lecanium persicae, Planococcus citri and Pseudococcus species.
