= Pseudohypatopa beljaevi =

Scientific classification
- Kingdom: Animalia
- Phylum: Arthropoda
- Clade: Pancrustacea
- Class: Insecta
- Order: Lepidoptera
- Family: Blastobasidae
- Genus: Pseudohypatopa
- Species: P. beljaevi

Binomial name
- Pseudohypatopa beljaevi Sinev, 2007

Species of moth

Pseudohypatopa beljaevi is a moth in the family Blastobasidae. It is known from eastern Russia.
