= Holcocera villella =

Scientific classification
- Domain: Eukaryota
- Kingdom: Animalia
- Phylum: Arthropoda
- Class: Insecta
- Order: Lepidoptera
- Family: Blastobasidae
- Genus: Holcocera
- Species: H. villella

Binomial name
- Holcocera villella (Busck, 1900)

Synonyms
- Triclonella villella Busck, 1900; Holcocera vilella Dietz, 1910; Holcocera augusti Heinrich, 1920

Species of moth

Holcocera villella is a moth in the family Blastobasidae. It is found in the United States, including Maryland, Oregon, Maine and California.

The larvae feed on the seeds of Pinus species.
