= Holcocera guilandinae =

Scientific classification
- Domain: Eukaryota
- Kingdom: Animalia
- Phylum: Arthropoda
- Class: Insecta
- Order: Lepidoptera
- Family: Blastobasidae
- Genus: Holcocera
- Species: H. guilandinae

Binomial name
- Holcocera guilandinae (Busck, 1900)

Synonyms
- Blastobasis guilandinae Busck, 1900

Species of moth

Holcocera guilandinae is a moth in the family Blastobasidae. It is found in the United States in southern Florida and on Bermuda.

The length of the forewings is 6.1-9.2 mm.

The larvae feed in the stem of Caesalpina bonducella and Garberia heterophylla.
