= Holcocera macrotoma =

Scientific classification
- Kingdom: Animalia
- Phylum: Arthropoda
- Class: Insecta
- Order: Lepidoptera
- Family: Blastobasidae
- Genus: Holcocera
- Species: H. macrotoma

Binomial name
- Holcocera macrotoma Meyrick, 1916

Species of moth

Holcocera macrotoma is a moth in the family Blastobasidae. It was described by Edward Meyrick in 1916. It is found in southern India.
