= Pseudohypatopa ramusella =

Scientific classification
- Kingdom: Animalia
- Phylum: Arthropoda
- Clade: Pancrustacea
- Class: Insecta
- Order: Lepidoptera
- Family: Blastobasidae
- Genus: Pseudohypatopa
- Species: P. ramusella

Binomial name
- Pseudohypatopa ramusella Adamski & H.H. Li, 2010

Species of moth

Pseudohypatopa ramusella is a moth in the family Blastobasidae. It was described by Adamski and H.H. Li in 2010. It is found in China (Beijing).
