= Calosima munroei =

Scientific classification
- Kingdom: Animalia
- Phylum: Arthropoda
- Clade: Pancrustacea
- Class: Insecta
- Order: Lepidoptera
- Family: Blastobasidae
- Genus: Calosima
- Species: C. munroei

Binomial name
- Calosima munroei Adamski, 2003

Species of moth

Calosima munroei is a moth in the family Blastobasidae. It is found in the Marin and Contra Costa counties of coastal California.

The length of the forewings is 7.4–9 mm.

Larvae have been reared from cones of Cupressus goveniana, Cupressus sargenti and also from dead willow.

== Etymology ==
The species is named in honor of Eugene Munroe.
