= Barbaloba meleagrisellae =

Scientific classification
- Kingdom: Animalia
- Phylum: Arthropoda
- Clade: Pancrustacea
- Class: Insecta
- Order: Lepidoptera
- Family: Blastobasidae
- Genus: Barbaloba
- Species: B. meleagrisellae

Binomial name
- Barbaloba meleagrisellae Adamski, 2013

Species of moth

Barbaloba meleagrisellae is a moth in the family Blastobasidae. It is found in Costa Rica.

The length of the forewings is about 5.1 mm.
