= Calosima albafaciella =

Scientific classification
- Domain: Eukaryota
- Kingdom: Animalia
- Phylum: Arthropoda
- Class: Insecta
- Order: Lepidoptera
- Family: Blastobasidae
- Genus: Calosima
- Species: C. albafaciella

Binomial name
- Calosima albafaciella Adamski, 2002

Species of moth

Calosima albafaciella is a moth in the family Blastobasidae which is endemic to Thailand.
