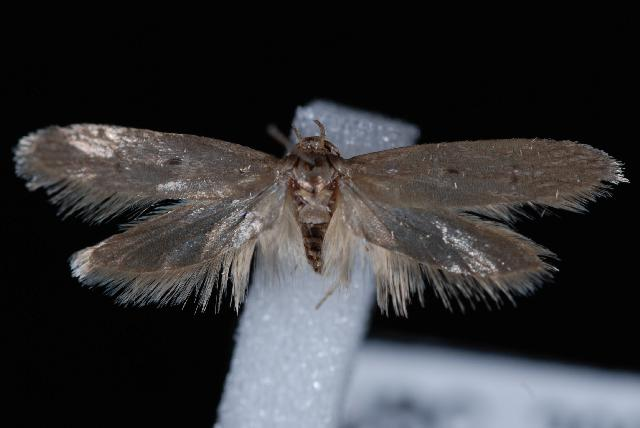

Scientific classification
- Kingdom: Animalia
- Phylum: Arthropoda
- Clade: Pancrustacea
- Class: Insecta
- Order: Lepidoptera
- Family: Blastobasidae
- Genus: Holcocera
- Species: H. chalcofrontella

Binomial name
- Holcocera chalcofrontella Clemens, 1863

Synonyms
- Holcocera purpurocomella Clemens, 1863; Holcocera gilbociliella Clemens, 1863; Holcocera gibbociliella; Blastobasis chalcofrontella var. quisquiliella Zeller, 1873; Blastobasis livorella Zeller, 1873; Nothris maligemmella Murtfeldt, 1898; Holcocera ochrocephala Dietz, 1910; Holcocera chalcofrontella var. minorella Dietz, 1910; Holcocera chalcofrontella var. fumerella Dietz, 1910; Holcocera funebra var. reductella Dietz, 1910

= Holcocera chalcofrontella =

Species of moth

Holcocera chalcofrontella is a moth in the family Blastobasidae. It is found in North America, including Pennsylvania, Texas, Missouri, Maryland, West Virginia, Arizona, British Columbia, Florida, Illinois, Maine, Manitoba, Michigan, New Brunswick, Ohio, Ontario, Quebec, Tennessee, Vermont and Washington.

Larvae have been reared on the seeds of Rhus species, as well as the burrs of chestnuts.
