= Holcocera lyrae =

Scientific classification
- Kingdom: Animalia
- Phylum: Arthropoda
- Clade: Pancrustacea
- Class: Insecta
- Order: Lepidoptera
- Family: Blastobasidae
- Genus: Holcocera
- Species: H. lyrae

Binomial name
- Holcocera lyrae Adamski, 2002

Species of moth

Holcocera lyrae is a moth in the family Blastobasidae which is endemic to Costa Rica.
