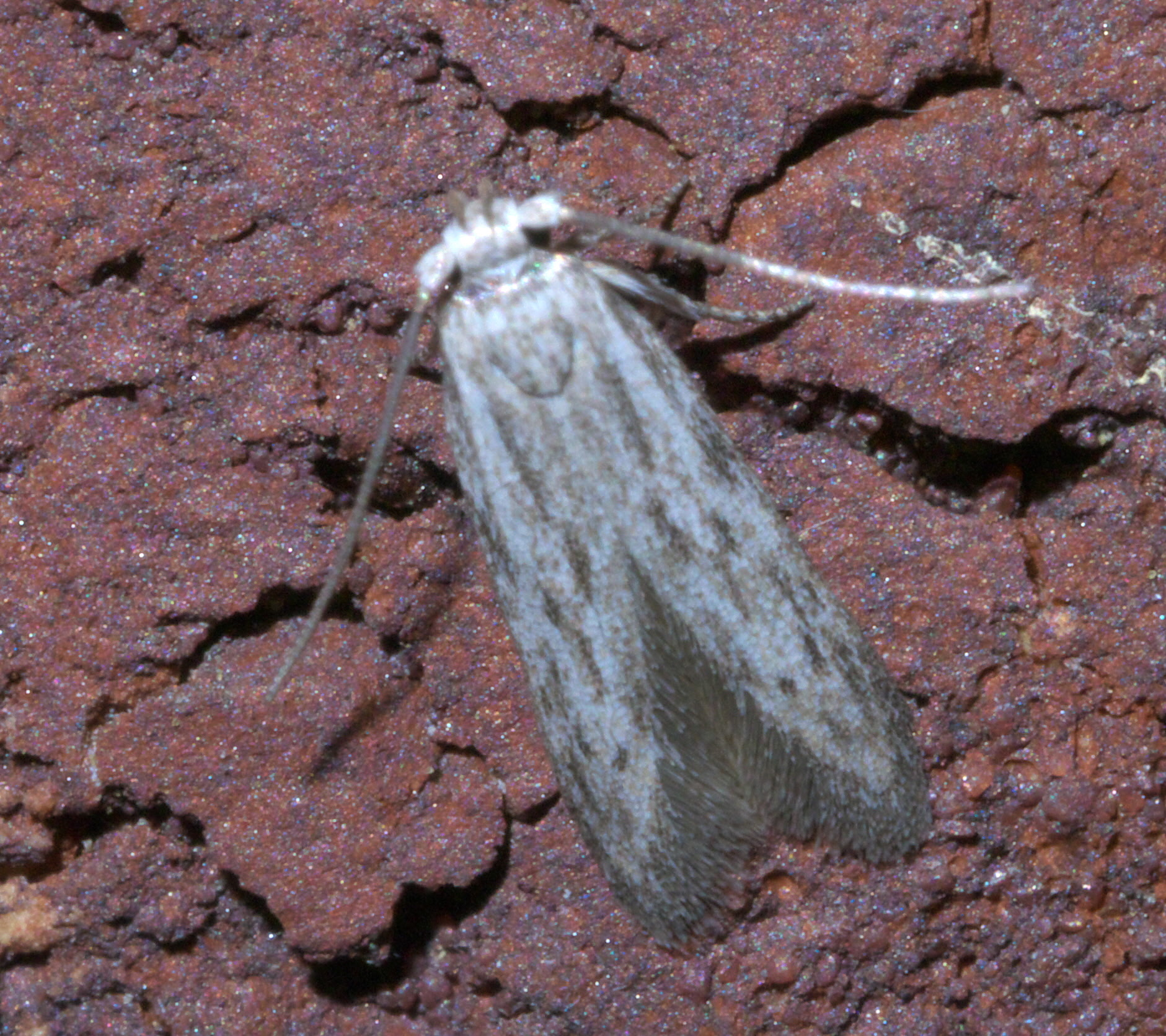
- Calosima albapenella, Oklahoma

Scientific classification
- Kingdom: Animalia
- Phylum: Arthropoda
- Clade: Pancrustacea
- Class: Insecta
- Order: Lepidoptera
- Family: Blastobasidae
- Genus: Calosima
- Species: C. albapenella

Binomial name
- Calosima albapenella (Chambers, 1875)

Synonyms
- Butalis albapenella Chambers, 1875; Scythris albapenella; Blastobasis citrocolella Chambers, 1880; Comstockia citrocolella; Holcocera nana Dietz, 1910; Blastobasis citricolella Chambers, 1880; Zenodochium citricolella; Blastobasis citriella

= Calosima albapenella =

Species of moth

Calosima albapenella is a moth in the family Blastobasidae. It is found in the United States, including Texas and Florida.

The wingspan is about 19 mm or less.

The larvae have been found in dry oranges infested by the beetle Arseocerus fasciculatus.
