= Mastema occidentalis =

Scientific classification
- Kingdom: Animalia
- Phylum: Arthropoda
- Clade: Pancrustacea
- Class: Insecta
- Order: Lepidoptera
- Family: Blastobasidae
- Genus: Mastema
- Species: M. occidentalis

Binomial name
- Mastema occidentalis Adamski, 1989

Species of moth

Mastema occidentalis is a moth in the family Blastobasidae. It is found in Arizona, United States.
