= Holcocera gargantuella =

Scientific classification
- Domain: Eukaryota
- Kingdom: Animalia
- Phylum: Arthropoda
- Class: Insecta
- Order: Lepidoptera
- Family: Blastobasidae
- Genus: Holcocera
- Species: H. gargantuella

Binomial name
- Holcocera gargantuella (Heinrich, 1920)

Synonyms
- Eubolepia gargantuella Heinrich, 1920

Species of moth

Holcocera gargantuella is a moth in the family Blastobasidae. It is found in the United States, including Arizona.

Larvae have been reared from galls found on Quercus alba, as well as Cynipidae-galls.
