= Calosima elyella =

Scientific classification
- Domain: Eukaryota
- Kingdom: Animalia
- Phylum: Arthropoda
- Class: Insecta
- Order: Lepidoptera
- Family: Blastobasidae
- Genus: Calosima
- Species: C. elyella

Binomial name
- Calosima elyella (Dietz, 1910)

Synonyms
- Holcocera elyella Dietz, 1910

Species of moth

Calosima elyella is a moth in the family Blastobasidae. It is found in the United States, including Connecticut, Maryland, New Jersey, Florida, Illinois and Maine.
