= Hallicis clavicula =

Scientific classification
- Kingdom: Animalia
- Phylum: Arthropoda
- Clade: Pancrustacea
- Class: Insecta
- Order: Lepidoptera
- Family: Blastobasidae
- Genus: Hallicis
- Species: H. clavicula

Binomial name
- Hallicis clavicula Adamski, 2013

Species of moth

Hallicis clavicula is a moth in the family Blastobasidae. It is found in Costa Rica.

The length of the forewings is 4.6–5.7 mm.
