= Holcocera basiplagata =

Scientific classification
- Domain: Eukaryota
- Kingdom: Animalia
- Phylum: Arthropoda
- Class: Insecta
- Order: Lepidoptera
- Family: Blastobasidae
- Genus: Holcocera
- Species: H. basiplagata

Binomial name
- Holcocera basiplagata Walsingham, 1912

Species of moth

Holcocera basiplagata is a moth in the family Blastobasidae. It was described by Walsingham in 1912. It is found in Guatemala.
