= Holcocera extensa =

Scientific classification
- Domain: Eukaryota
- Kingdom: Animalia
- Phylum: Arthropoda
- Class: Insecta
- Order: Lepidoptera
- Family: Blastobasidae
- Genus: Holcocera
- Species: H. extensa

Binomial name
- Holcocera extensa (Meyrick, 1918)

Synonyms
- Blastobasis extensa Meyrick, 1918

Species of moth

Holcocera extensa is a moth in the family Blastobasidae. It is found in South Africa.

The length of the forewings is 8.2–8.5 mm.
