= Iconisma =

Scientific classification
- Domain: Eukaryota
- Kingdom: Animalia
- Phylum: Arthropoda
- Class: Insecta
- Order: Lepidoptera
- Family: Blastobasidae
- Genus: Iconisma; Walsingham, 1897

Moth genus in family Blastobasidae

Iconisma is a genus of moths in the family Blastobasidae.

== Species ==
- Iconisma macrocera Walsingham, 1897

== Former species ==
- Iconisma rosmarinella Walsingham, 1901
