= Auximobasis liberatella =

Scientific classification
- Kingdom: Animalia
- Phylum: Arthropoda
- Class: Insecta
- Order: Lepidoptera
- Family: Blastobasidae
- Genus: Auximobasis
- Species: A. liberatella

Binomial name
- Auximobasis liberatella (Walker, 1864)

Synonyms
- Gelechia liberatella Walker, 1864; Blastobasis liberatella

Species of moth

Auximobasis liberatella is a moth in the family Blastobasidae. It was described by Francis Walker in 1864. It is found in Brazil (Ega).
