= Holcocera gozmanyi =

Scientific classification
- Kingdom: Animalia
- Phylum: Arthropoda
- Clade: Pancrustacea
- Class: Insecta
- Order: Lepidoptera
- Family: Blastobasidae
- Genus: Holcocera
- Species: H. gozmanyi

Binomial name
- Holcocera gozmanyi Adamski & Landry, 2007

Species of moth

Holcocera gozmanyi is a moth in the family Blastobasidae. It was described by Adamski and Landry in 2007. It is found on the Galapagos Islands.
