= Holcocera anomalella =

Scientific classification
- Domain: Eukaryota
- Kingdom: Animalia
- Phylum: Arthropoda
- Class: Insecta
- Order: Lepidoptera
- Family: Blastobasidae
- Genus: Holcocera
- Species: H. anomalella

Binomial name
- Holcocera anomalella (Dietz, 1910)

Synonyms
- Eubolepia anomalella Dietz, 1910

Species of moth

Holcocera anomalella is a moth in the family Blastobasidae. It is found in the United States, including Arizona.
