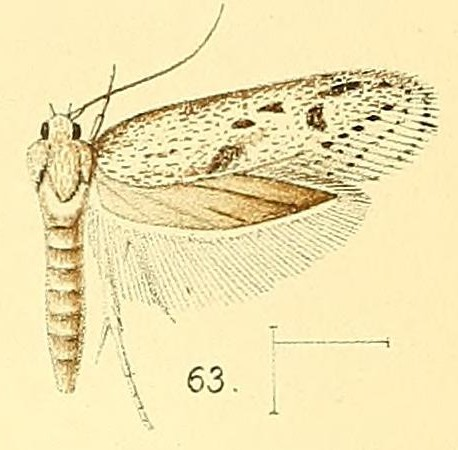

Scientific classification
- Domain: Eukaryota
- Kingdom: Animalia
- Phylum: Arthropoda
- Class: Insecta
- Order: Lepidoptera
- Family: Blastobasidae
- Genus: Holcocera
- Species: H. irroratella

Binomial name
- Holcocera irroratella (Walsingham, 1891)

Synonyms
- Blastobasis irroratella Walsingham, 1891; Tecmerium irroratella

= Holcocera irroratella =

Species of moth

Holcocera irroratella is a moth in the family Blastobasidae. It is found in South Africa and Gambia.

The length of the forewings is 6.6 mm. The forewings are white intermixed with white scales tipped with brown and some brown scales. The hindwings are pale brown, gradually darkening towards the apex.
