= Holcocera coccivorella =

Scientific classification
- Kingdom: Animalia
- Phylum: Arthropoda
- Clade: Pancrustacea
- Class: Insecta
- Order: Lepidoptera
- Family: Blastobasidae
- Genus: Holcocera
- Species: H. coccivorella

Binomial name
- Holcocera coccivorella (Chambers, 1880)

Synonyms
- Blastobasis coccivorella Chambers, 1880

Species of moth

Holcocera coccivorella, the scale-feeding scavenger moth, is a moth in the family Blastobasidae. It is found in North America, including Florida and Maine.

Larvae have been reared on coccid-scales found on an oak.
