= Auximobasis angusta =

Scientific classification
- Kingdom: Animalia
- Phylum: Arthropoda
- Class: Insecta
- Order: Lepidoptera
- Family: Blastobasidae
- Genus: Auximobasis
- Species: A. angusta

Binomial name
- Auximobasis angusta Meyrick, 1922

Synonyms
- Blastobasis angusta

Species of moth

Auximobasis angusta is a moth in the family Blastobasidae. It was described by Edward Meyrick in 1922. It is found in Colombia and Ecuador.
