= Auximobasis incretata =

Scientific classification
- Kingdom: Animalia
- Phylum: Arthropoda
- Class: Insecta
- Order: Lepidoptera
- Family: Blastobasidae
- Genus: Auximobasis
- Species: A. incretata

Binomial name
- Auximobasis incretata Meyrick, 1931

Synonyms
- Blastobasis incretata

Species of moth

Auximobasis incretata is a moth in the family Blastobasidae. It was described by Edward Meyrick in 1931. It is found in Peru.
