= Auximobasis obstricta =

Scientific classification
- Kingdom: Animalia
- Phylum: Arthropoda
- Class: Insecta
- Order: Lepidoptera
- Family: Blastobasidae
- Genus: Auximobasis
- Species: A. obstricta

Binomial name
- Auximobasis obstricta Meyrick, 1918

Synonyms
- Blastobasis obstricta

Species of moth

Auximobasis obstricta is a moth in the family Blastobasidae. It was described by Edward Meyrick in 1918. It is found in Guyana.
