= Iconisma macrocera =

Scientific classification
- Domain: Eukaryota
- Kingdom: Animalia
- Phylum: Arthropoda
- Class: Insecta
- Order: Lepidoptera
- Family: Blastobasidae
- Genus: Iconisma
- Species: I. macrocera

Binomial name
- Iconisma macrocera Walsingham, 1897

Species of moth

Iconisma macrocera is a moth in the family Blastobasidae. It was described by Walsingham in 1897. It is found in the West Indies.
