= Xenopathia nivea =

Scientific classification
- Domain: Eukaryota
- Kingdom: Animalia
- Phylum: Arthropoda
- Class: Insecta
- Order: Lepidoptera
- Family: Blastobasidae
- Genus: Xenopathia
- Species: X. nivea

Binomial name
- Xenopathia nivea Rebel, 1902

Species of moth

Xenopathia nivea is a moth in the family Blastobasidae. It is found in Transcaspia.
