= Tecmerium spermophagia =

Scientific classification
- Domain: Eukaryota
- Kingdom: Animalia
- Phylum: Arthropoda
- Class: Insecta
- Order: Lepidoptera
- Family: Blastobasidae
- Genus: Tecmerium
- Species: T. spermophagia

Binomial name
- Tecmerium spermophagia Walsingham, 1907

Species of moth

Tecmerium spermophagia is a moth in the family Blastobasidae. It is found in Portugal and Spain.

The wingspan is 14–17 mm. The forewings are whitish cinereous (ash-grey), dusted with brownish grey. The hindwings are shining pale brownish grey.

Larvae have been reared from seed-whorls of Phlomis purpurea.
