= Holcocera increta =

Scientific classification
- Kingdom: Animalia
- Phylum: Arthropoda
- Class: Insecta
- Order: Lepidoptera
- Family: Blastobasidae
- Genus: Holcocera
- Species: H. increta

Binomial name
- Holcocera increta Meyrick, 1930

Species of moth

Holcocera increta is a moth in the family Blastobasidae. It was described by Edward Meyrick in 1930. It is found in northern Vietnam.
