= Holcocera gigantella =

Scientific classification
- Kingdom: Animalia
- Phylum: Arthropoda
- Clade: Pancrustacea
- Class: Insecta
- Order: Lepidoptera
- Family: Blastobasidae
- Genus: Holcocera
- Species: H. gigantella

Binomial name
- Holcocera gigantella Chambers, 1876

Synonyms
- Blastobasis gigantella

Species of moth

Holcocera gigantella is a moth in the family Blastobasidae. It is found in the United States, including Colorado, Arizona and California.

The wingspan is about 22 mm.

The larvae feed on the seeds and pods of Yucca species.
