= Xenopathia novaki =

Scientific classification
- Domain: Eukaryota
- Kingdom: Animalia
- Phylum: Arthropoda
- Class: Insecta
- Order: Lepidoptera
- Family: Blastobasidae
- Genus: Xenopathia
- Species: X. novaki

Binomial name
- Xenopathia novaki (Rebel, 1891)

Synonyms
- Heydenia novaki Rebel, 1891; Holcocera corsica Gibeaux, 1993

Species of moth

Xenopathia novaki is a moth in the family Blastobasidae. It is found in Croatia, Greece and on Corsica.
