= Pseudohypatopa longicornutella =

Scientific classification
- Kingdom: Animalia
- Phylum: Arthropoda
- Class: Insecta
- Order: Lepidoptera
- Family: Blastobasidae
- Genus: Pseudohypatopa
- Species: P. longicornutella

Binomial name
- Pseudohypatopa longicornutella Park, 1989

Species of moth

Pseudohypatopa longicornutella is a moth in the family Blastobasidae first described by Kyu-Tek Park in 1999. It is found in Korea.
