= Calosima melanostriatella =

Scientific classification
- Domain: Eukaryota
- Kingdom: Animalia
- Phylum: Arthropoda
- Class: Insecta
- Order: Lepidoptera
- Family: Blastobasidae
- Genus: Calosima
- Species: C. melanostriatella

Binomial name
- Calosima melanostriatella (Dietz, 1910)

Synonyms
- Holcocera melanostriatella Dietz, 1910; Calosima melonostriatella

Species of moth

Calosima melanostriatella is a moth in the family Blastobasidae. It is found in the United States, including Connecticut, Maine, Ohio and Florida.
