= Holcocera titanica =

Scientific classification
- Domain: Eukaryota
- Kingdom: Animalia
- Phylum: Arthropoda
- Class: Insecta
- Order: Lepidoptera
- Family: Blastobasidae
- Genus: Holcocera
- Species: H. titanica

Binomial name
- Holcocera titanica Walsingham, 1912

Species of moth

Holcocera titanica is a moth in the family Blastobasidae. It was described by Walsingham in 1912. It is found in Mexico.
