= Holcocera aclydis =

Scientific classification
- Kingdom: Animalia
- Phylum: Arthropoda
- Clade: Pancrustacea
- Class: Insecta
- Order: Lepidoptera
- Family: Blastobasidae
- Genus: Holcocera
- Species: H. aclydis

Binomial name
- Holcocera aclydis Adamski, 2002

Species of moth

Holcocera aclydis is a moth in the family Blastobasidae which is endemic to Costa Rica.
