= Auximobasis neptes =

Scientific classification
- Domain: Eukaryota
- Kingdom: Animalia
- Phylum: Arthropoda
- Class: Insecta
- Order: Lepidoptera
- Family: Blastobasidae
- Genus: Auximobasis
- Species: A. neptes

Binomial name
- Auximobasis neptes (Walsingham, 1912)

Synonyms
- Valentinia neptes Walsingham, 1912; Blastobasis neptes

Species of moth

Auximobasis neptes is a moth in the family Blastobasidae. It was described by Walsingham in 1912. It is found in Mexico.
