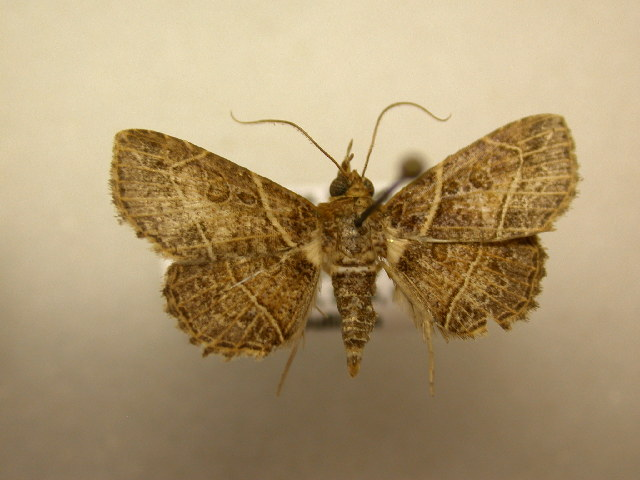

Scientific classification
- Kingdom: Animalia
- Phylum: Arthropoda
- Class: Insecta
- Order: Lepidoptera
- Superfamily: Noctuoidea
- Family: Erebidae
- Genus: Antiblemma
- Species: A. phaedra

Binomial name
- Antiblemma phaedra (Schaus, 1914)

Synonyms
- Capnodes phaedra Schaus, 1914

= Antiblemma phaedra =

Species of moth

Antiblemma phaedra is a moth of the family Noctuidae. It is found in Costa Rica.
