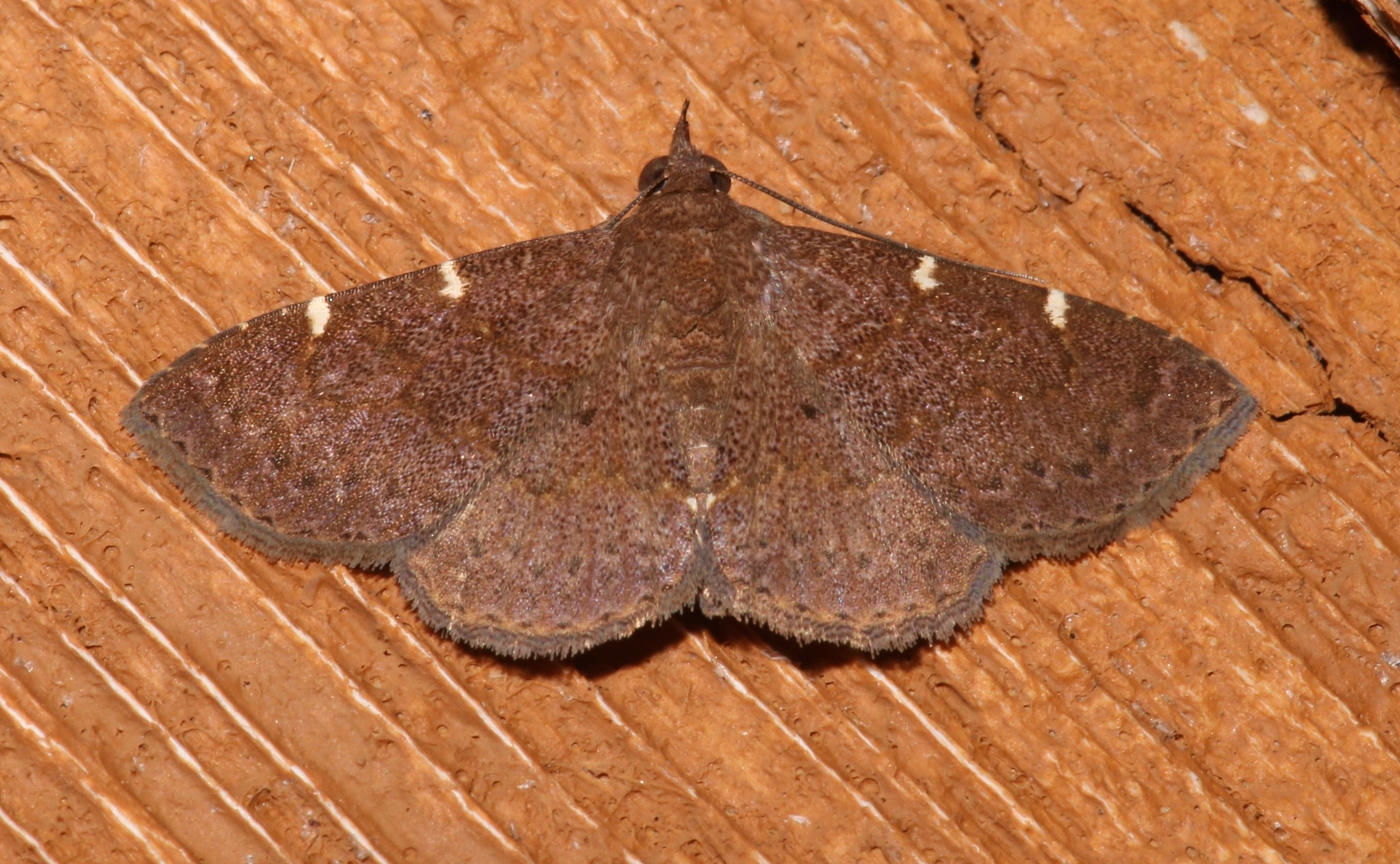

Scientific classification
- Kingdom: Animalia
- Phylum: Arthropoda
- Class: Insecta
- Order: Lepidoptera
- Superfamily: Noctuoidea
- Family: Erebidae
- Genus: Antiblemma
- Species: A. concinnula

Binomial name
- Antiblemma concinnula (Walker, 1865)

Synonyms
- Antiblemma priscilla (Möschler, 1890); Antiblemma distacta (Hampson, 1898)

= Antiblemma concinnula =

Species of moth

Antiblemma concinnula is a moth of the family Noctuidae first described by Francis Walker in 1865. It is found in Guadeloupe, Saint Kitts, Dominica, Grenada, Trinidad, Suriname and Brazil. It is also found in Florida.

The wingspan is 18–20 mm.
