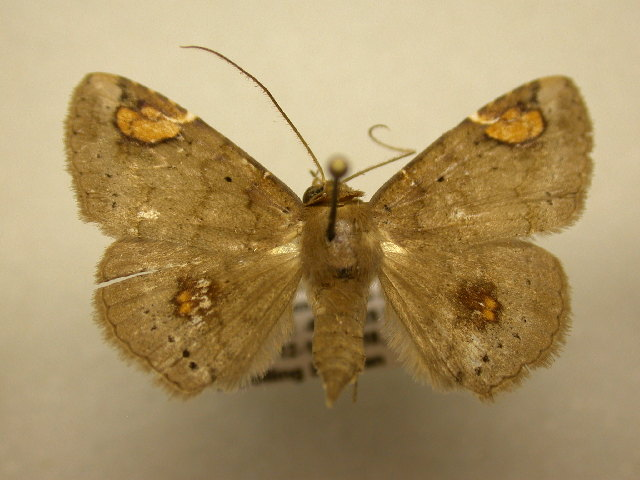

Scientific classification
- Domain: Eukaryota
- Kingdom: Animalia
- Phylum: Arthropoda
- Class: Insecta
- Order: Lepidoptera
- Superfamily: Noctuoidea
- Family: Erebidae
- Genus: Antiblemma
- Species: A. rhoda

Binomial name
- Antiblemma rhoda (H. Druce, 1898)

Synonyms
- Capnodes rhoda H. Druce, 1898

= Antiblemma rhoda =

Species of moth

Antiblemma rhoda is a moth of the family Noctuidae. It is found in Costa Rica.
