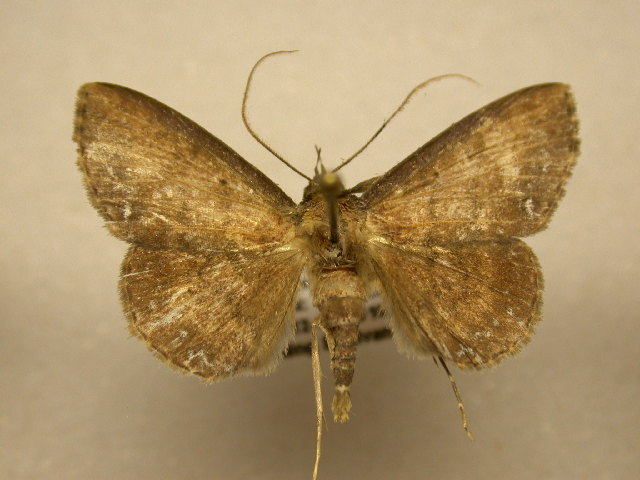

Scientific classification
- Kingdom: Animalia
- Phylum: Arthropoda
- Class: Insecta
- Order: Lepidoptera
- Superfamily: Noctuoidea
- Family: Erebidae
- Genus: Antiblemma
- Species: A. fulvipicta

Binomial name
- Antiblemma fulvipicta Hampson, 1926

= Antiblemma fulvipicta =

Species of moth

Antiblemma fulvipicta is a moth of the family Noctuidae. It is found in Costa Rica.
