= Antiblemma bistriga =

Scientific classification
- Domain: Eukaryota
- Kingdom: Animalia
- Phylum: Arthropoda
- Class: Insecta
- Order: Lepidoptera
- Superfamily: Noctuoidea
- Family: Erebidae
- Genus: Antiblemma
- Species: A. bistriga

Binomial name
- Antiblemma bistriga (Möschler, 1886)

Species of moth

Antiblemma bistriga is a moth of the family Noctuidae first described by Heinrich Benno Möschler in 1886. It is endemic to Jamaica.
