= Pseudokoleps =

Scientific classification
- Kingdom: Animalia
- Phylum: Arthropoda
- Clade: Pancrustacea
- Class: Insecta
- Order: Lepidoptera
- Family: Blastobasidae
- Genus: Pseudokoleps; Adamski, 2013
- Species: P. akainae

Binomial name
- Pseudokoleps akainae Adamski, 2013

Monotypic moth genus in family Blastobasidae

Pseudokoleps is a genus of moths in the family Blastobasidae. It contains only one species, Pseudokoleps akainae, which is found in Costa Rica.

The length of the forewings is 3.9–4.8 mm.
