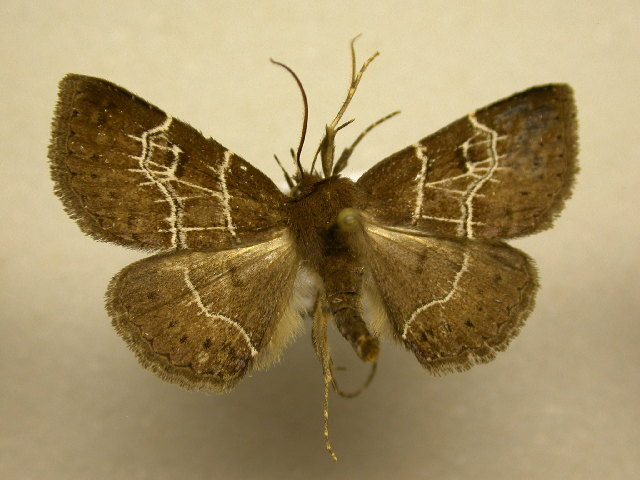

Scientific classification
- Kingdom: Animalia
- Phylum: Arthropoda
- Class: Insecta
- Order: Lepidoptera
- Superfamily: Noctuoidea
- Family: Erebidae
- Genus: Antiblemma
- Species: A. harmodia

Binomial name
- Antiblemma harmodia (Schaus, 1901)

Synonyms
- Capnodes harmodia Schaus, 1901

= Antiblemma harmodia =

Species of moth

Antiblemma harmodia is a moth of the family Noctuidae. It is found in Costa Rica.
