= Inbioxa =

Scientific classification
- Kingdom: Animalia
- Phylum: Arthropoda
- Clade: Pancrustacea
- Class: Insecta
- Order: Lepidoptera
- Family: Blastobasidae
- Genus: Inbioxa; Adamski, 2002
- Species: I. epithecae

Binomial name
- Inbioxa epithecae Adamski, 2002

Monotypic moth genus in family Blastobasidae

Inbioxa is a genus of moths in the family Blastobasidae. It contains only one species, Inbioxa epithecae, which is found in Costa Rica.
