= Pseudohypatopa =

Scientific classification
- Kingdom: Animalia
- Phylum: Arthropoda
- Clade: Pancrustacea
- Class: Insecta
- Order: Lepidoptera
- Family: Blastobasidae
- Subfamily: Holcocerinae
- Genus: Pseudohypatopa; Sinev, 1986

Moth genus in family Blastobasidae

Pseudohypatopa is a genus of moths in the family Blastobasidae. The genus was described by Sinev in 1986.

== Species ==
- Pseudohypatopa anthracographa (Meyrick, 1937)
- Pseudohypatopa beljaevi Sinev, 2007
- Pseudohypatopa longicornutella Park, 1989
- Pseudohypatopa longitubulata H. Zhen & H. H. Li, 2008
- Pseudohypatopa paulilobata H. Zhen & H. H. Li, 2008
- Pseudohypatopa pulverea (Meyrick, 1907)
- Pseudohypatopa ramusella Adamski & H. H. Li, 2010
