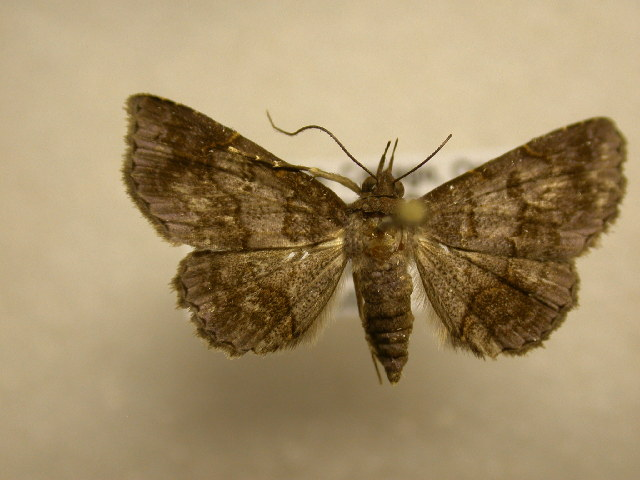

Scientific classification
- Domain: Eukaryota
- Kingdom: Animalia
- Phylum: Arthropoda
- Class: Insecta
- Order: Lepidoptera
- Superfamily: Noctuoidea
- Family: Erebidae
- Genus: Antiblemma
- Species: A. alcinoe

Binomial name
- Antiblemma alcinoe (H. Druce, 1890)

Synonyms
- Capnodes alcinoe H. Druce, 1890

= Antiblemma alcinoe =

Species of moth

Antiblemma alcinoe is a moth of the family Noctuidae. It is found in Costa Rica.
