= Antiblemma leucocyma =

Scientific classification
- Kingdom: Animalia
- Phylum: Arthropoda
- Class: Insecta
- Order: Lepidoptera
- Superfamily: Noctuoidea
- Family: Erebidae
- Genus: Antiblemma
- Species: A. leucocyma

Binomial name
- Antiblemma leucocyma Hampson, 1926

Species of moth

Antiblemma leucocyma is a moth of the family Noctuidae first described by George Hampson in 1926. It is native to Brazil. It has been studied as a potential biological control agent for Miconia calvescens, an invasive tree considered one of the greatest threats to natural ecosystems of Hawaii and other Pacific islands.

The larvae feed on the leaves of Miconia calvescens, making holes of an irregular shape.
