= Coniogenes =

Scientific classification
- Kingdom: Animalia
- Phylum: Arthropoda
- Class: Insecta
- Order: Lepidoptera
- Family: Blastobasidae
- Genus: Coniogenes; Meyrick, 1936
- Species: C. contempta

Binomial name
- Coniogenes contempta Meyrick, 1936

Monotypic moth genus in family Blastobasidae

Coniogenes is a monotypic genus of moths in the family Blastobasidae. The sole species is Coniogenes contempta, which is endemic to Taiwan.
