= Prosintis =

Scientific classification
- Kingdom: Animalia
- Phylum: Arthropoda
- Class: Insecta
- Order: Lepidoptera
- Family: Blastobasidae
- Genus: Prosintis; Meyrick, 1916
- Species: P. florivora

Binomial name
- Prosintis florivora Meyrick, 1916

Monotypic moth genus in family Blastobasidae

Prosintis is a genus of moths in the family Blastobasidae. It contains the single species Prosintis florivora, which is found in India.
