= Antiblemma rufinans =

Scientific classification
- Kingdom: Animalia
- Phylum: Arthropoda
- Class: Insecta
- Order: Lepidoptera
- Superfamily: Noctuoidea
- Family: Erebidae
- Genus: Antiblemma
- Species: A. rufinans

Binomial name
- Antiblemma rufinans (Guenée, 1852)

Synonyms
- Antiblemma torrida (Walker, 1865); Antiblemma lara (H. Druce, 1890); Antiblemma astyla (Möschler, 1890); Antiblemma punctivena (J. B. Smith, 1900); Antiblemma discerpta (Walker, 1858) (form); Antiblemma marita (Schaus, 1901) (form)

Species of moth

Antiblemma rufinans, the live oak antiblemma, is a moth of the family Noctuidae. The species was first described by Achille Guenée in 1852. It is found in dry, sandy woodlands, barrens, and scrub forests of the southern Florida plain. It is also present in South America, Cuba and Jamaica.

The larvae feed on live oak species.
