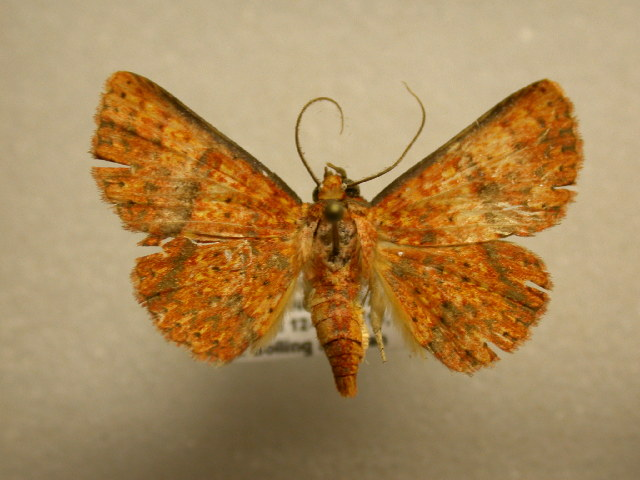

Scientific classification
- Domain: Eukaryota
- Kingdom: Animalia
- Phylum: Arthropoda
- Class: Insecta
- Order: Lepidoptera
- Superfamily: Noctuoidea
- Family: Erebidae
- Genus: Antiblemma
- Species: A. lothos

Binomial name
- Antiblemma lothos (Cramer, 1777)

Synonyms
- Phalaena lothos Cramer, 1777

= Antiblemma lothos =

Species of moth

Antiblemma lothos is a moth of the family Noctuidae. It is found in Costa Rica.
