= Koleps =

Scientific classification
- Kingdom: Animalia
- Phylum: Arthropoda
- Clade: Pancrustacea
- Class: Insecta
- Order: Lepidoptera
- Family: Blastobasidae
- Genus: Koleps; Adamski, 2013
- Species: K. angulatus

Binomial name
- Koleps angulatus Adamski, 2013

Monotypic moth genus in family Blastobasidae

Koleps is a genus of moths in the family Blastobasidae. It contains only one species, Koleps angulatus, which is found in Costa Rica.

The length of the forewings is about 6.3 mm.
