= Antiblemma acrosema =

Scientific classification
- Domain: Eukaryota
- Kingdom: Animalia
- Phylum: Arthropoda
- Class: Insecta
- Order: Lepidoptera
- Superfamily: Noctuoidea
- Family: Erebidae
- Genus: Antiblemma
- Species: A. acrosema

Binomial name
- Antiblemma acrosema (Mabille, 1900)

Synonyms
- Capnodes acrosema Mabille, 1900

Species of moth

Antiblemma acrosema is a moth of the family Noctuidae first described by Paul Mabille in 1900. It is native to Madagascar.
