= Barbaloba =

Scientific classification
- Kingdom: Animalia
- Phylum: Arthropoda
- Clade: Pancrustacea
- Class: Insecta
- Order: Lepidoptera
- Family: Blastobasidae
- Genus: Barbaloba; Adamski, 2013

Moth genus in family Blastobasidae

Barbaloba is a genus of moths in the family Blastobasidae.

== Species ==
- Barbaloba jubae Adamski, 2013
- Barbaloba meleagrisellae Adamski, 2013
