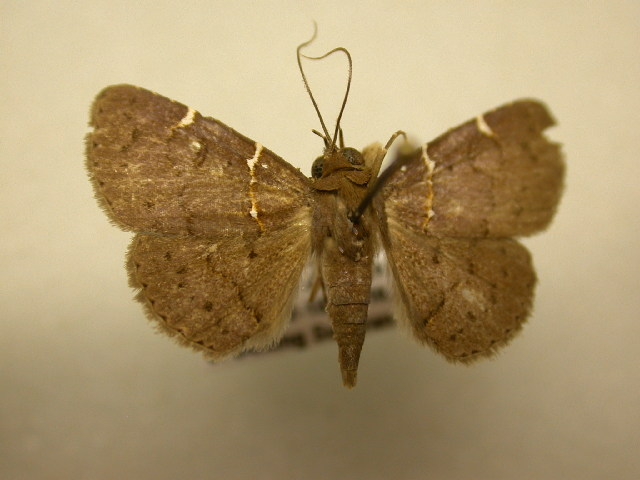

Scientific classification
- Kingdom: Animalia
- Phylum: Arthropoda
- Clade: Pancrustacea
- Class: Insecta
- Order: Lepidoptera
- Superfamily: Noctuoidea
- Family: Erebidae
- Genus: Antiblemma
- Species: A. anguinea

Binomial name
- Antiblemma anguinea (Schaus, 1911)

Synonyms
- Capnodes anguinea Schaus, 1911; Antiblemma anguinae

= Antiblemma anguinea =

Species of moth

Antiblemma anguinea is a moth of the family Noctuidae. It is found in Costa Rica.
