= Lateantenna =

Scientific classification
- Kingdom: Animalia
- Phylum: Arthropoda
- Clade: Pancrustacea
- Class: Insecta
- Order: Lepidoptera
- Family: Blastobasidae
- Genus: Lateantenna; Amsel, 1968
- Species: L. fuscella

Binomial name
- Lateantenna fuscella Amsel, 1968

Monotypic moth genus in family Blastobasidae

Lateantenna is a genus of moths in the family Blastobasidae. It contains the single species Lateantenna fuscella, which is found in western Pakistan.
