= Critoxena =

Scientific classification
- Kingdom: Animalia
- Phylum: Arthropoda
- Class: Insecta
- Order: Lepidoptera
- Family: Blastobasidae
- Genus: Critoxena; Meyrick, 1930
- Species: C. agraphopis

Binomial name
- Critoxena agraphopis Meyrick, 1930

Monotypic moth genus in family Blastobasidae

Critoxena is a genus of moths in the family Blastobasidae. It contains the single species Critoxena agraphopis, which is found in India.
