= Calosima orthophrontis =

Scientific classification
- Kingdom: Animalia
- Phylum: Arthropoda
- Class: Insecta
- Order: Lepidoptera
- Family: Blastobasidae
- Genus: Calosima
- Species: C. orthophrontis

Binomial name
- Calosima orthophrontis (Meyrick, 1932)

Synonyms
- Holcocera orthophrontis Meyrick, 1932

Species of moth

Calosima orthophrontis is a moth in the family Blastobasidae. It is found in Bolivia.
