= Antiblemma calida =

Scientific classification
- Domain: Eukaryota
- Kingdom: Animalia
- Phylum: Arthropoda
- Class: Insecta
- Order: Lepidoptera
- Superfamily: Noctuoidea
- Family: Erebidae
- Genus: Antiblemma
- Species: A. calida

Binomial name
- Antiblemma calida Butler, 1878

Synonyms
- Capnodes callida

Species of moth

Antiblemma calida is a moth of the family Noctuidae first described by Arthur Gardiner Butler in 1878. It is endemic to Jamaica.
