= Antiblemma imitans =

Scientific classification
- Kingdom: Animalia
- Phylum: Arthropoda
- Class: Insecta
- Order: Lepidoptera
- Superfamily: Noctuoidea
- Family: Erebidae
- Genus: Antiblemma
- Species: A. imitans

Binomial name
- Antiblemma imitans (Walker, 1858)

Species of moth

Antiblemma imitans is a moth of the family Noctuidae first described by Francis Walker in 1858. It is found in Honduras and French Guiana.

The wingspan is about 33 mm.
