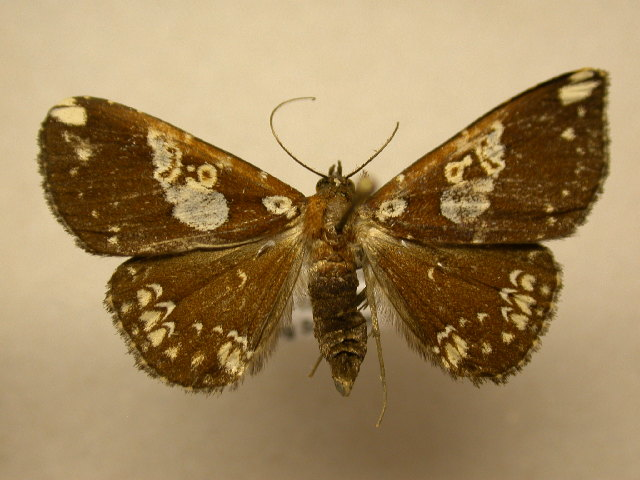

Scientific classification
- Domain: Eukaryota
- Kingdom: Animalia
- Phylum: Arthropoda
- Class: Insecta
- Order: Lepidoptera
- Superfamily: Noctuoidea
- Family: Erebidae
- Genus: Antiblemma
- Species: A. chephira

Binomial name
- Antiblemma chephira (Schaus, 1911)

Synonyms
- Capnodes chephira Schaus, 1911

= Antiblemma chephira =

Species of moth

Antiblemma chephira is a moth of the family Noctuidae. It is found in Costa Rica.
