= Syncola =

Scientific classification
- Kingdom: Animalia
- Phylum: Arthropoda
- Class: Insecta
- Order: Lepidoptera
- Family: Blastobasidae
- Genus: Syncola; Meyrick, 1916
- Species: S. epaphria

Binomial name
- Syncola epaphria Meyrick, 1916

Monotypic moth genus in family Blastobasidae

Syncola is a genus of moths in the family Blastobasidae. There are few important species which are enemies of lac insects.

- Syncola crypsimorpha Meyrick_1922 and
- Syncola pulverea have been recorded as pests of lac insects in India (Mahesh, et al.,2022 ).
- Syncola epaphria Meyrick (Sri Lanka).
- Syncola beljaevi (Sinev, 2007) (from Sibiria)
