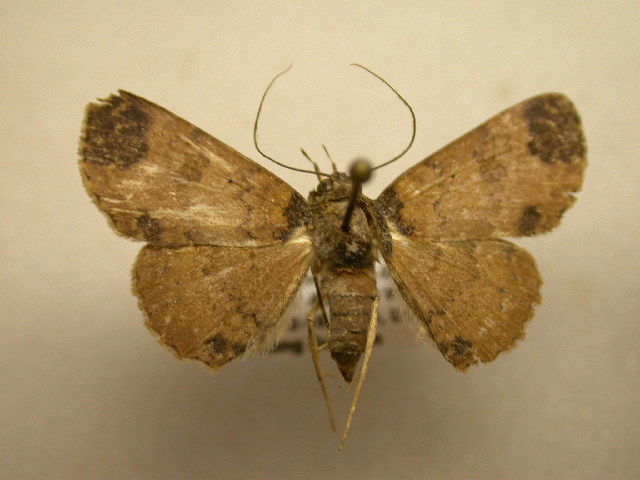

Scientific classification
- Domain: Eukaryota
- Kingdom: Animalia
- Phylum: Arthropoda
- Class: Insecta
- Order: Lepidoptera
- Superfamily: Noctuoidea
- Family: Erebidae
- Genus: Antiblemma
- Species: A. hembrilla

Binomial name
- Antiblemma hembrilla (Schaus, 1912)

Synonyms
- Capnodes hembrilla Schaus, 1912

= Antiblemma hembrilla =

Species of moth

Antiblemma hembrilla is a moth of the family Noctuidae. It is found in Costa Rica.
