= Mastema (moth) =

Scientific classification
- Kingdom: Animalia
- Phylum: Arthropoda
- Clade: Pancrustacea
- Class: Insecta
- Order: Lepidoptera
- Family: Blastobasidae
- Genus: Mastema; Adamski, 1989

Moth genus in family Blastobasidae

Mastema is a genus of moth in the family Blastobasidae.

== Species ==
- Mastema occidentalis Adamski, 1989
