= Antiblemma filaria =

Scientific classification
- Kingdom: Animalia
- Phylum: Arthropoda
- Clade: Pancrustacea
- Class: Insecta
- Order: Lepidoptera
- Superfamily: Noctuoidea
- Family: Erebidae
- Genus: Antiblemma
- Species: A. filaria

Binomial name
- Antiblemma filaria (Smith, 1900)

Species of moth

Antiblemma filaria is a species of moth in the family Erebidae. It was described by Smith in 1900 and is found in North America.

The MONA or Hodges number for Antiblemma filaria is 8578.
