= Antiblemma nannodes =

Scientific classification
- Kingdom: Animalia
- Phylum: Arthropoda
- Class: Insecta
- Order: Lepidoptera
- Superfamily: Noctuoidea
- Family: Erebidae
- Genus: Antiblemma
- Species: A. nannodes

Binomial name
- Antiblemma nannodes Hampson, 1926

Species of moth

Antiblemma nannodes is a moth of the family Noctuidae first described by George Hampson in 1926. It is found in Jamaica and Cuba.
