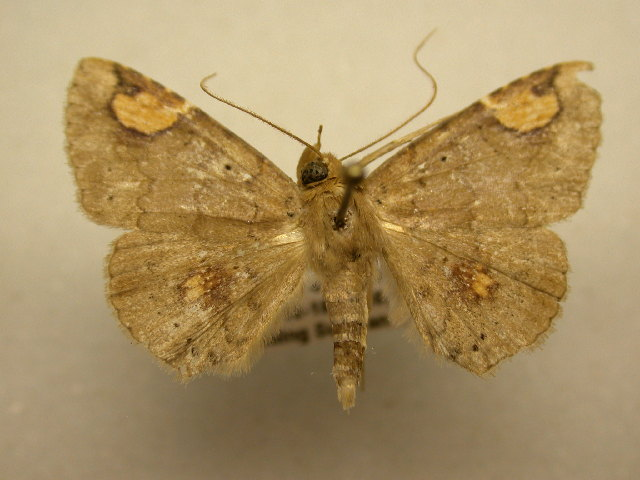

Scientific classification
- Domain: Eukaryota
- Kingdom: Animalia
- Phylum: Arthropoda
- Class: Insecta
- Order: Lepidoptera
- Superfamily: Noctuoidea
- Family: Erebidae
- Genus: Antiblemma
- Species: A. uncinata

Binomial name
- Antiblemma uncinata (Felder & Rogenhofer, 1874)

Synonyms
- Capnodes uncinata Felder & Rogenhofer, 1874

= Antiblemma uncinata =

Species of moth

Antiblemma uncinata is a moth of the family Noctuidae. It is found in Costa Rica.
