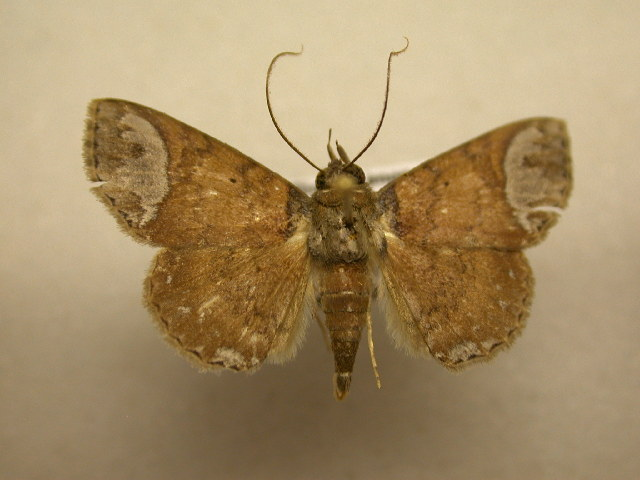

Scientific classification
- Domain: Eukaryota
- Kingdom: Animalia
- Phylum: Arthropoda
- Class: Insecta
- Order: Lepidoptera
- Superfamily: Noctuoidea
- Family: Erebidae
- Genus: Antiblemma
- Species: A. amalthea

Binomial name
- Antiblemma amalthea (Schaus, 1911)

Synonyms
- Capnodes amalthea Schaus, 1911

= Antiblemma amalthea =

Species of moth

Antiblemma amalthea is a moth of the family Noctuidae. It is found in Costa Rica.
