= Exinotis =

Scientific classification
- Kingdom: Animalia
- Phylum: Arthropoda
- Clade: Pancrustacea
- Class: Insecta
- Order: Lepidoptera
- Family: Blastobasidae
- Genus: Exinotis; Meyrick, 1916
- Species: E. catachlora

Binomial name
- Exinotis catachlora Meyrick, 1916

Monotypic moth genus in family Blastobasidae

Exinotis is a genus of moths in the family Blastobasidae. It contains the single species Exinotis catachlora, which is found in India.
