= Tecmerium rosmarinella =

Scientific classification
- Domain: Eukaryota
- Kingdom: Animalia
- Phylum: Arthropoda
- Class: Insecta
- Order: Lepidoptera
- Family: Blastobasidae
- Genus: Tecmerium
- Species: T. rosmarinella

Binomial name
- Tecmerium rosmarinella (Walsingham, 1901)

Synonyms
- Iconisma rosmarinella Walsingham, 1901; Tecmerium rosmarinellum

Species of moth

Tecmerium rosmarinella is a moth in the family Blastobasidae. It is found in France.

The larvae feed on Rosmarinus officinalis.
