= Tecmerium =

Scientific classification
- Domain: Eukaryota
- Kingdom: Animalia
- Phylum: Arthropoda
- Class: Insecta
- Order: Lepidoptera
- Family: Blastobasidae
- Genus: Tecmerium; Walsingham, 1907

Synonyms
- Oroclintrus Gozmány, 1957

Moth genus in family Blastobasidae

Tecmerium is a genus of moths in the family Blastobasidae.

== Species ==
- Tecmerium anthophaga
- Tecmerium mnemosynella
- Tecmerium perplexum
- Tecmerium rosmarinella
- Tecmerium spermophagia
