= Antiblemma subrutilans =

Scientific classification
- Kingdom: Animalia
- Phylum: Arthropoda
- Class: Insecta
- Order: Lepidoptera
- Superfamily: Noctuoidea
- Family: Erebidae
- Genus: Antiblemma
- Species: A. subrutilans

Binomial name
- Antiblemma subrutilans (Walker, 1858)

Synonyms
- Thermesia subrutilans Walker, 1858

Species of moth

Antiblemma subrutilans is a moth of the family Noctuidae. It is found in Ecuador and Costa Rica.
