= Heredia (moth) =

Scientific classification
- Kingdom: Animalia
- Phylum: Arthropoda
- Clade: Pancrustacea
- Class: Insecta
- Order: Lepidoptera
- Clade: Apoditrysia
- Superfamily: Gelechioidea
- Family: Blastobasidae
- Genus: Heredia; Adamski, 2002
- Species: H. contemptionis

Binomial name
- Heredia contemptionis Adamski, 2002

Monotypic moth genus in family Blastobasidae

Heredia is a genus of moths in the family Blastobasidae. It contains only one species, Heredia contemptionis, which is found in Costa Rica.
