= Auximobasis agrestis =

Scientific classification
- Kingdom: Animalia
- Phylum: Arthropoda
- Class: Insecta
- Order: Lepidoptera
- Family: Blastobasidae
- Genus: Auximobasis
- Species: A. agrestis

Binomial name
- Auximobasis agrestis Meyrick, 1922

Synonyms
- Blastobasis agrestis

Species of moth

Auximobasis agrestis is a moth in the family Blastobasidae. It was described by Edward Meyrick in 1922. It is found in Pará, Brazil.
