= Xenopathia =

Scientific classification
- Kingdom: Animalia
- Phylum: Arthropoda
- Class: Insecta
- Order: Lepidoptera
- Family: Blastobasidae
- Genus: Xenopathia; Rebel, 1901

Moth genus in family Blastobasidae

Xenopathia is a genus of moths in the family Blastobasidae.

== Species ==
- Xenopathia nivea
- Xenopathia novaki (Rebel, 1891)
