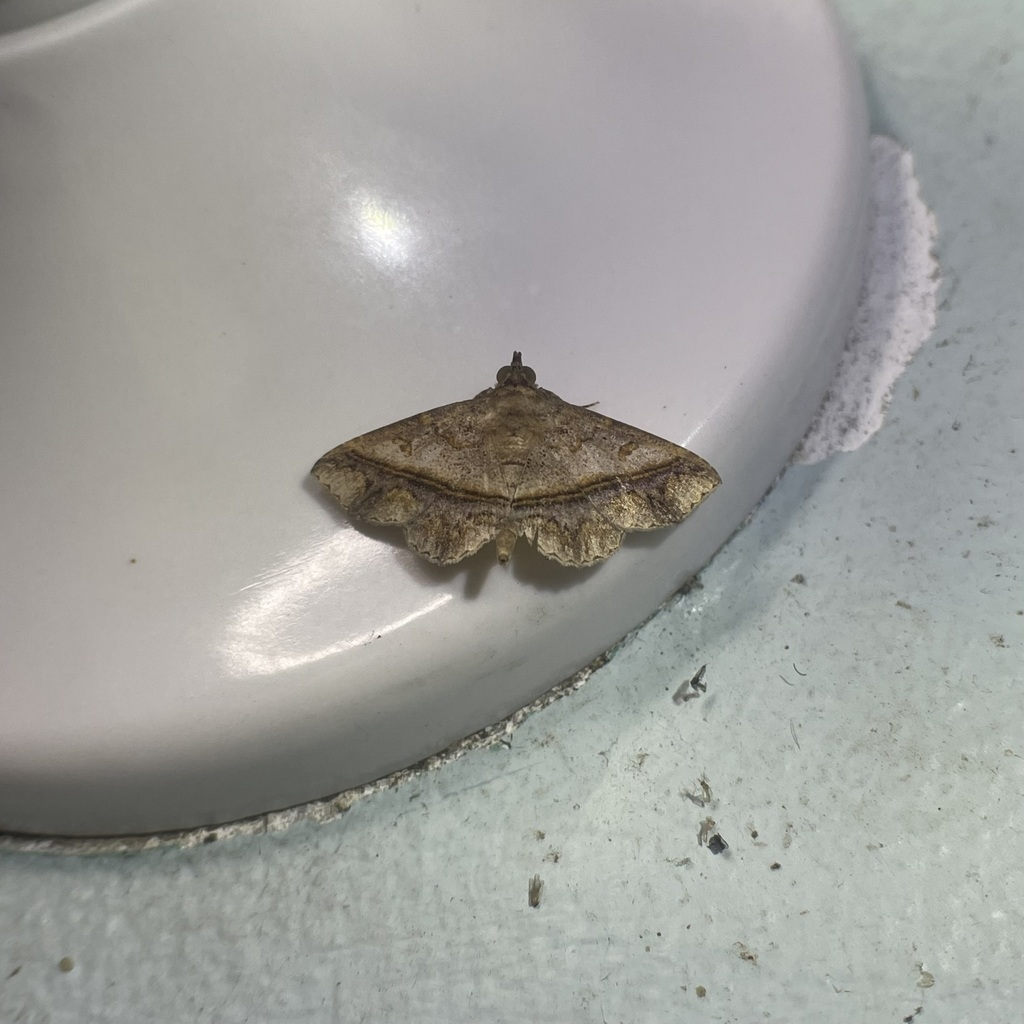

Scientific classification
- Kingdom: Animalia
- Phylum: Arthropoda
- Clade: Pancrustacea
- Class: Insecta
- Order: Lepidoptera
- Superfamily: Noctuoidea
- Family: Erebidae
- Genus: Antiblemma
- Species: A. acclinalis

Binomial name
- Antiblemma acclinalis Hübner, 1823

= Antiblemma acclinalis =

Species of moth

Antiblemma acclinalis is a moth of the family Noctuidae first described by Jacob Hübner in 1823. It is native to the Antilles. It was introduced in Hawaii to control Clidemia hirta. Although it has become established on Oahu, there is no indication that populations have persisted on Kauai or on Maui, where the moth was first released in 1996.
