= Pseudohypatopa anthracographa =

Scientific classification
- Kingdom: Animalia
- Phylum: Arthropoda
- Class: Insecta
- Order: Lepidoptera
- Family: Blastobasidae
- Genus: Pseudohypatopa
- Species: P. anthracographa

Binomial name
- Pseudohypatopa anthracographa (Meyrick, 1937)

Synonyms
- Holcocera anthracographa Meyrick, 1937

Species of moth

Pseudohypatopa anthracographa is a moth in the family Blastobasidae. It was described by Edward Meyrick in 1937. It is found in Assam, India.
