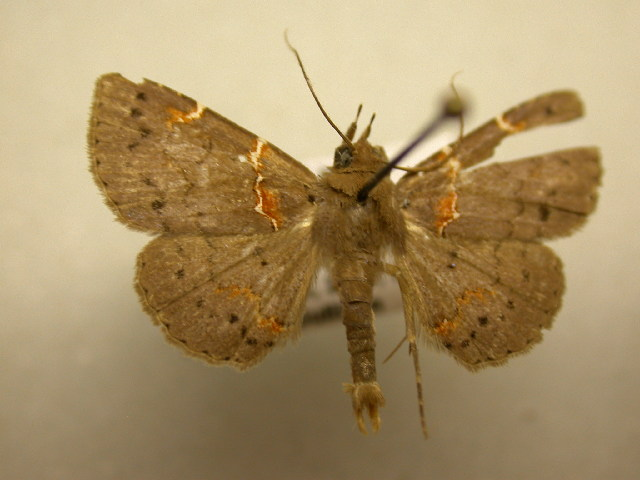

Scientific classification
- Kingdom: Animalia
- Phylum: Arthropoda
- Clade: Pancrustacea
- Class: Insecta
- Order: Lepidoptera
- Superfamily: Noctuoidea
- Family: Erebidae
- Genus: Antiblemma
- Species: A. lacteigera

Binomial name
- Antiblemma lacteigera (Butler, 1879)

Synonyms
- Capnodes lacteigera Butler, 1879

= Antiblemma lacteigera =

Species of moth

Antiblemma lacteigera is a moth of the family Noctuidae. It is found in Costa Rica.
