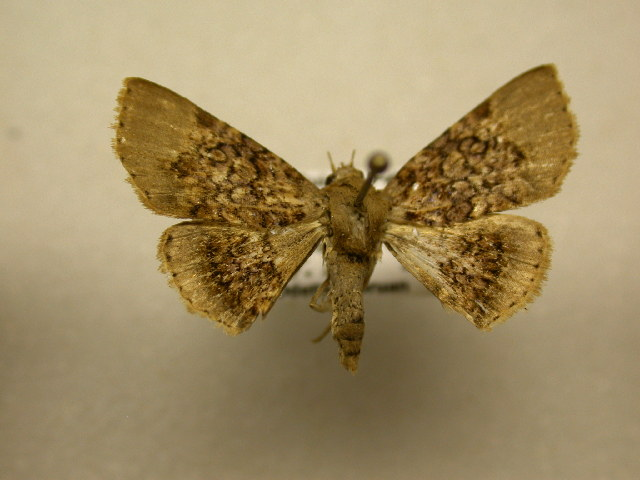

Scientific classification
- Domain: Eukaryota
- Kingdom: Animalia
- Phylum: Arthropoda
- Class: Insecta
- Order: Lepidoptera
- Superfamily: Noctuoidea
- Family: Erebidae
- Genus: Antiblemma
- Species: A. solina

Binomial name
- Antiblemma solina (Stoll, 1790)

Synonyms
- Phalaena solina Stoll, 1790

= Antiblemma solina =

Species of moth

Antiblemma solina is a moth of the family Noctuidae. It is found in Neotropics.
