= Pheos =

Scientific classification
- Kingdom: Animalia
- Phylum: Arthropoda
- Clade: Pancrustacea
- Class: Insecta
- Order: Lepidoptera
- Family: Blastobasidae
- Genus: Pheos; Adamski, 2013
- Species: P. aculeatus

Binomial name
- Pheos aculeatus Adamski, 2013

Monotypic moth genus in family Blastobasidae

Pheos is a genus of moths in the family Blastobasidae. It contains only one species, Pheos aculeatus, which is found in Costa Rica.

The length of the forewings is 5.9–6.5 mm.
