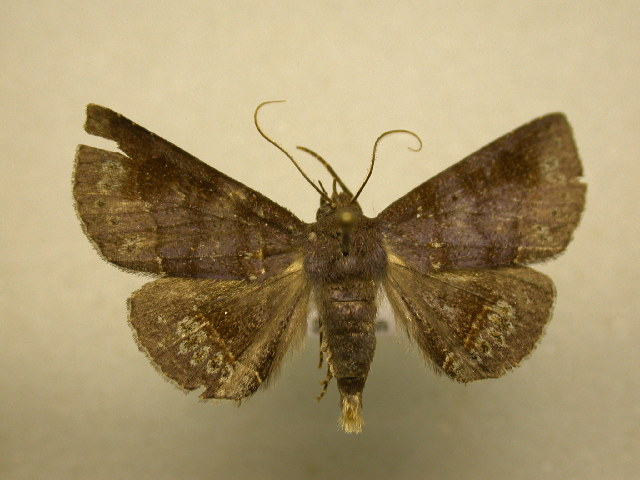
- Antiblemma agrestis

Scientific classification
- Kingdom: Animalia
- Phylum: Arthropoda
- Clade: Pancrustacea
- Class: Insecta
- Order: Lepidoptera
- Superfamily: Noctuoidea
- Family: Erebidae
- Subfamily: Eulepidotinae
- Tribe: Panopodini
- Genus: Antiblemma; Hübner, 1823

Synonyms
- Capnodes Guenee, 1852; Egryrlon Smith, 1900; Gerisa Walker, 1858

= Antiblemma =

Genus of moths

Antiblemma is a genus of moths of the family Noctuidae.

== Species ==
- Antiblemma abas (Schaus 1914)
- Antiblemma abstrusa (Schaus 1911)
- Antiblemma acclinalis Hubner 1823
- Antiblemma accumulata (Schaus 1914)
- Antiblemma acidalia (Holland 1894)
- Antiblemma acron (Schaus 1914)
- Antiblemma acrosema (Mabille 1900)
- Antiblemma addana (Schaus 1911)
- Antiblemma aeson (Schaus 1914)
- Antiblemma agnita (Druce 1890)
- Antiblemma agrestis (Schaus 1911)
- Antiblemma agrotera (Druce 1890)
- Antiblemma albicosta (Dyar 1909)
- Antiblemma albicostata (Poole 1989)
- Antiblemma albipunctata (Druce 1900)
- Antiblemma albizonea Hampson 1924
- Antiblemma alcinoe (Druce 1890)
- Antiblemma amalthea (Schaus 1911)
- Antiblemma amarga (Schaus 1911)
- Antiblemma andersoni Schaus 1940
- Antiblemma anguinea (Schaus 1911)
- Antiblemma anhypa (Guenee 1852)
- Antiblemma anthea (Schaus 1914)
- Antiblemma argyrozonea Hampson 1926
- Antiblemma baccata (Schaus 1914)
- Antiblemma barcas (Schaus 1914)
- Antiblemma barine (Schaus 1914)
- Antiblemma binota Felder & Rogenhofer 1874
- Antiblemma bira Felder & Rogenhofer 1874
- Antiblemma bistriata (Butler 1879)
- Antiblemma bistriga (Moschler 1886)
- Antiblemma boliviensis (Dognin 1912)
- Antiblemma borrega (Schaus 1901)
- Antiblemma brassorata Kaye 1925
- Antiblemma brevipennis (Walker 1865)
- Antiblemma c-album (Felder & Rogenhofer 1874)
- Antiblemma calais (Schaus 1914)
- Antiblemma calida (Butler 1878)
- Antiblemma californica (Behr 1870)
- Antiblemma caparata Kaye 1925
- Antiblemma catenosa (Guenee 1852)
- Antiblemma censura (Dognin 1912)
- Antiblemma ceras (Druce 1898)
- Antiblemma ceres (Schaus 1914)
- Antiblemma chephira (Schaus 1911)
- Antiblemma chiva (Schaus 1911)
- Antiblemma cinereoides Poole 1989
- Antiblemma cingulata (Cramer 1782)
- Antiblemma concinnula (Walker 1865)
- Antiblemma contenta (Moschler 1880)
- Antiblemma dentimargo Hampson 1926
- Antiblemma deois (Schaus 1914)
- Antiblemma diffinota Kaye 1925
- Antiblemma diplogramma Hampson 1926
- Antiblemma discobola Hampson 1926
- Antiblemma discomaculata (Brabant 1910)
- Antiblemma distacta (Hampson 1898)
- Antiblemma erythromma Hampson 1926
- Antiblemma eschata Hampson 1924
- Antiblemma eurytermes Hampson 1926
- Antiblemma exhilarans (Walker 1858)
- Antiblemma extima (Walker 1868)
- Antiblemma filaria (Smith 1900)
- Antiblemma fulvicentralis Hampson 1926
- Antiblemma fulvipicta Hampson 1926
- Antiblemma furvipars Hampson 1926
- Antiblemma gladysia (Schaus 1914)
- Antiblemma glaucosia Hampson 1926
- Antiblemma gromatica (Dognin 1912)
- Antiblemma hamilcar (Schaus 1914)
- Antiblemma hannibal (Schaus 1914)
- Antiblemma harmodia (Schaus 1901)
- Antiblemma hembrilla (Schaus 1912)
- Antiblemma herilis (Schaus 1913)
- Antiblemma hersilea (Schaus 1912)
- Antiblemma ignifera (Dognin 1912)
- Antiblemma imitans (Walker 1858)
- Antiblemma imitatura (Walker 1858)
- Antiblemma incarnans Felder & Rogenhofer 1874
- Antiblemma inconspicua (Herrich-Schaffer 1870)
- Antiblemma indigna (Butler 1879)
- Antiblemma inferior (Warren 1889)
- Antiblemma invenusta (Walker 1865)
- Antiblemma irene (Guenee 1852)
- Antiblemma juruana (Butler 1879)
- Antiblemma lacteigera (Butler 1879)
- Antiblemma lappa (Druce 1890)
- Antiblemma laranda (Druce 1890)
- Antiblemma lateritia (Dognin 1912)
- Antiblemma leucocyma Hampson 1926
- Antiblemma leucomochla Hampson 1924
- Antiblemma leucospila (Walker 1865)
- Antiblemma lilacina (Dognin 1912)
- Antiblemma linens (Felder & Rogenhofer 1874)
- Antiblemma linula (Guenee 1852)
- Antiblemma lola (Schaus 1901)
- Antiblemma lothos (Cramer 1777)
- Antiblemma luna (Guenee 1852)
- Antiblemma lycoris (Schaus 1912)
- Antiblemma melanoides (Moschler 1880)
- Antiblemma melanosemata Hampson 1926
- Antiblemma memoranda (Schaus 1911)
- Antiblemma mundicola (Walker 1865)
- Antiblemma nannodes Hampson 1926
- Antiblemma neptis (Cramer 1779)
- Antiblemma nigerrimasigna (Strand 1920)
- Antiblemma nitidaria (Stoll 1782)
- Antiblemma notiaphila (Butler 1879)
- Antiblemma ochrilineata (Dognin 1912)
- Antiblemma ochrozonea Hampson 1926
- Antiblemma ocina (Druce 1900)
- Antiblemma octalis Hubner 1823
- Antiblemma odontozona Hampson 1926
- Antiblemma orbiculata (Felder & Rogenhofer 1874)
- Antiblemma ortega (Dognin 1897)
- Antiblemma palindica (Schaus 1901)
- Antiblemma pallida (Butler 1879)
- Antiblemma paraddana (Dognin 1912)
- Antiblemma partita (Schaus 1914)
- Antiblemma patifaciens (Walker 1858)
- Antiblemma pelops (Schaus 1914)
- Antiblemma penelope (Schaus 1911)
- Antiblemma perornata (Schaus 1911)
- Antiblemma peruda (Schaus 1911)
- Antiblemma phaedra (Schaus 1914)
- Antiblemma phoenicopyra Hampson 1926
- Antiblemma pira (Druce 1898)
- Antiblemma pobra (Dognin 1897)
- Antiblemma polyodon Hampson 1926
- Antiblemma porphyrota Hampson 1926
- Antiblemma prisca (Moschler 1890)
- Antiblemma prospera (Walker 1858)
- Antiblemma punctistriga (Herrich-Schaffer 1870)
- Antiblemma purpuripicta Hampson 1926
- Antiblemma pyralicolor (Guenee 1852)
- Antiblemma quarima (Schaus 1901)
- Antiblemma recocta (Dognin 1912)
- Antiblemma restricta (Brabant 1910)
- Antiblemma rhoda (Druce 1898)
- Antiblemma rotundifera (Walker 1858)
- Antiblemma rubecula (Felder & Rogenhofer 1874)
- Antiblemma rubida (Schaus 1911)
- Antiblemma rubrifusca (Schaus 1911)
- Antiblemma rubrilinea (Schaus 1911)
- Antiblemma rufinans (Guenee 1852)
- Antiblemma senilis (Butler 1879)
- Antiblemma sexplagiata (Walker 1858)
- Antiblemma solina (Stoll 1790)
- Antiblemma spectanda (Moschler 1880)
- Antiblemma stelligera (Schaus 1901)
- Antiblemma sterope (Stoll 1780)
- Antiblemma stictogyna Hampson 1926
- Antiblemma strigatula Hampson 1926
- Antiblemma strigilla (Guenee 1852)
- Antiblemma stulta (Moschler 1880)
- Antiblemma subrutilans (Walker 1858)
- Antiblemma sufficiens (Walker 1858)
- Antiblemma terrigena (Dognin 1912)
- Antiblemma tetraspila (Walker 1858)
- Antiblemma trepidula (Dognin 1912)
- Antiblemma trogocycla Hampson 1926
- Antiblemma trova (Dognin 1897)
- Antiblemma tuisa (Schaus 1911)
- Antiblemma turbata (Butler 1879)
- Antiblemma tuva (Schaus 1911)
- Antiblemma tyroe (Schaus 1914)
- Antiblemma uncinata (Felder & Rogenhofer 1874)
- Antiblemma undilla (Schaus 1901)
- Antiblemma vacca (Schaus 1901)
- Antiblemma versicolor (Herrich-Schaffer 1870)
- Antiblemma virginia (Schaus 1906)
