= Blastobasis retectella =

Scientific classification
- Kingdom: Animalia
- Phylum: Arthropoda
- Clade: Pancrustacea
- Class: Insecta
- Order: Lepidoptera
- Family: Blastobasidae
- Genus: Blastobasis
- Species: B. retectella

Binomial name
- Blastobasis retectella Zeller, 1873

Synonyms
- Blastobasis fractilinea Zeller, 1873; Valentinia retectella; Holcocera retectella

Species of moth in genus Blastobasis

Blastobasis retectella is a moth in the family Blastobasidae. It is found in the United States, including Texas, Florida and Maine.
