= "Holcoceroides" scythrella =

Scientific classification
- Kingdom: Animalia
- Phylum: Arthropoda
- Class: Insecta
- Order: Lepidoptera
- Family: Blastobasidae
- Genus: Holcoceroides Sinev, 1986 non Strand, 1913
- Species: H. scythrella

Binomial name
- Holcoceroides scythrella Sinev, 1986

Synonyms
- Tecmerium scythrella

Species of moth

Holcoceroides is a genus of moths in the family Blastobasidae. It contains only one species, Holcoceroides scythrella, which is found in Russia.
