= Docostoma =

Scientific classification
- Kingdom: Animalia
- Phylum: Arthropoda
- Class: Insecta
- Order: Lepidoptera
- Family: Blastobasidae
- Genus: Docostoma; Diakonoff, 1955
- Species: D. insignis

Binomial name
- Docostoma insignis Diakonoff, 1955

Monotypic moth genus in family Blastobasidae

Docostoma is a genus of moths in the family Blastobasidae. It contains the single species Docostoma insignis, which is found in New Guinea.
