= Calosima =

Scientific classification
- Kingdom: Animalia
- Phylum: Arthropoda
- Clade: Pancrustacea
- Class: Insecta
- Order: Lepidoptera
- Family: Blastobasidae
- Tribe: Holcocerini
- Genus: Calosima; Dietz, 1910

Species
- Several, see text

Moth genus in family Blastobasidae

Calosima is a gelechioid moth genus of the family Blastobasidae.

== Species ==
- Calosima albafasciata Adamski, 2002
- Calosima albafaciella
- Calosima albapenella
- Calosima alienigenae
- Calosima arguta
- Calosima argyrosplendella
- Calosima ancorae
- Calosima audentiae
- Calosima carinae
- Calosima citharae
- Calosima dianella
- Calosima darwini Adamski & Landry, 1997
- Calosima elyella
- Calosima fabulae
- Calosima fallaciae
- Calosima favillae
- Calosima flammae
- Calosima furiae
- Calosima helicae
- Calosima illicis
- Calosima laureae
- Calosima lepidophaga
- Calosima lucidella
- Calosima malikuli Adamski, 2002
- Calosima medusae
- Calosima megarae
- Calosima melanostriatella
- Calosima moriutii Adamski, 2002
- Calosima munroei
- Calosima orbae
- Calosima orthophrontis
- Calosima paterae
- Calosima sepulturae
- Calosima tesserae
