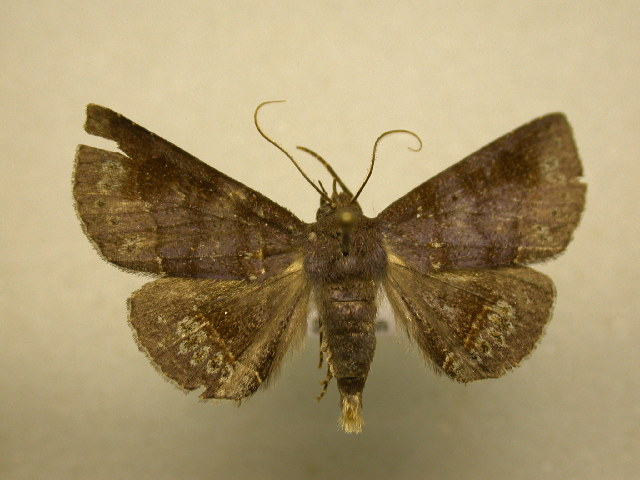

Scientific classification
- Domain: Eukaryota
- Kingdom: Animalia
- Phylum: Arthropoda
- Class: Insecta
- Order: Lepidoptera
- Superfamily: Noctuoidea
- Family: Erebidae
- Genus: Antiblemma
- Species: A. agrestis

Binomial name
- Antiblemma agrestis (Schaus, 1911)

Synonyms
- Capnodes agrestis Schaus, 1911

= Antiblemma agrestis =

Species of moth

Antiblemma agrestis is a moth of the family Noctuidae. It is found in Costa Rica.
