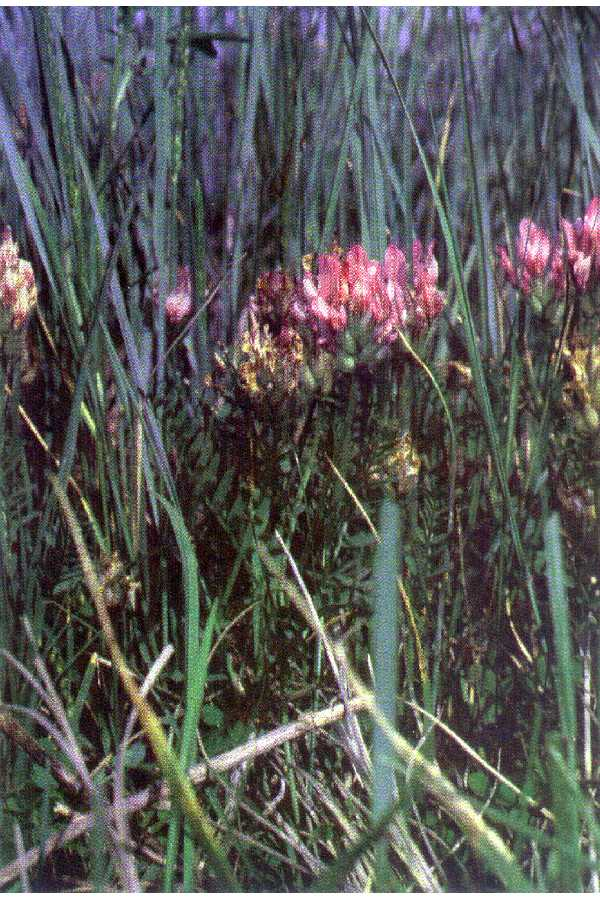

Conservation status
- Secure (NatureServe)

Scientific classification
- Kingdom: Plantae
- Clade: Embryophytes
- Clade: Tracheophytes
- Clade: Spermatophytes
- Clade: Angiosperms
- Clade: Eudicots
- Clade: Rosids
- Order: Fabales
- Family: Fabaceae
- Subfamily: Faboideae
- Genus: Astragalus
- Species: A. agrestis

Binomial name
- Astragalus agrestis Dougl. ex G.Don, 1832

Synonyms
- Astragalus dasyglottis Astragalus goniatus Astragalus hypoglottis

= Astragalus agrestis =

Species of milkvetch

Astragalus agrestis is a species of milkvetch known by the common names purple milkvetch, purple loco, and field milkvetch. It is native to much of western and northern North America from most of Canada to the southwestern United States, as well as northern Asia. It grows in vernally moist areas such as meadows, and is often found in sagebrush.

== Description ==
This is a perennial herb growing a slender but sturdy stem from an underground caudex. It leans or grows upright to a maximum height near 30 centimeters. The stem is often roughly hairy. Alternately arranged leaves are up to 10 centimeters long and made up of several pairs of leaflets up to 2 centimeters long each. They are oval to lance-shaped and may have notched tips. The inflorescence is an oval-shaped cluster of up to 15 purple or pink-tinted to nearly white pealike flowers. Each flower is up to 2 centimeters long. Flowers bloom May to August.

The fruit is an oval-shaped legume pod up to a centimeter long. It is dark colored with white hairs and dries to a papery texture.

== Range ==
Purple milkvetch is native to northern Asia and to the northwestern half of North America. In Asia it grows in Kazakhstan, Xinjiang in western China, and Mongolia. In Russian Asia it is found in West Siberia, Krasnoyarsk Krai, Altai Krai, Tuva, and Yakutiya.

In North America it grows in the Arctic in Alaska, Yukon, and the Northwest Territories. Further south in Canada it is native from British Columbia as far east as Québec. It is native to every state in the northwest United States as well as the Dakotas, Nebraska, Minnesota, and Iowa to the east. In the south west it is found in California, Nevada, and Utah, but not Arizona. It also grows in New Mexico.

== Cultivation ==
When grown in garden settings the network of roots spreads enthusiastically and must be confined if the landscaper does not want a large patch of purple milkvetch.
