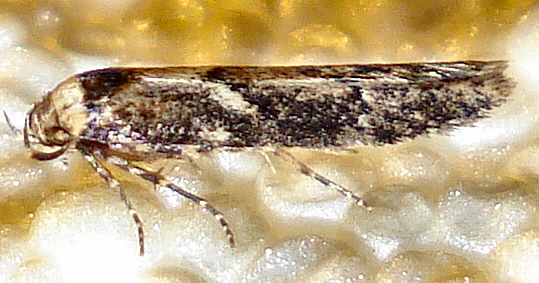
- Adult Blastobasis adustella from Lincolnshire (UK)

Scientific classification
- Kingdom: Animalia
- Phylum: Arthropoda
- Clade: Pancrustacea
- Class: Insecta
- Order: Lepidoptera
- Superfamily: Gelechioidea
- Family: Blastobasidae (disputed); Meyrick, 1894

Diversity
- About 24 genera and 377 species

Synonyms
- Pigritiae Dietz, 1910; Butalinae Walsingham, 1890; Holcocerini Adamski & Brown, 1989

= Blastobasidae =

Family of moths

The Blastobasidae are a family of moths in the superfamily Gelechioidea. Its species can be found almost anywhere in the world, though in some places they are not native but introduced by humans. In some arrangements, these moths are included in the case-bearer family (Coleophoridae) as subfamily Blastobasinae. The Symmocidae are sometimes included in the Blastobasidae (particularly if both are included in Coleophoridae) as subfamily or tribe.

In addition, the group around Holcocera is often separated as subfamily Holcocerinae (or tribe Holcocerini) from the Blastobasis lineage (which correspondingly become a subfamily, or a tribe Blastobasini). While this seems far more reasonable than some of the more extreme arrangements sometimes seen in Gelechioidea taxonomy and systematics, the relationships among Blastobasidae genera are not yet sufficiently studied to allow a well-supported subdivision of this family.

== Description and ecology ==
The adults are generally small, slender moths which at a casual glance lack conspicuous and characteristic features – noted entomologist Edward Meyrick once described the group as "obscure and dull-coloured moths, decidedly the least attractive family of Lepidoptera". Their coloration is usually reddish-brown, without crisp streaks or large wingspots.

The head is smooth, with moderately long antennae (slightly more than half as long as the forewings) which are each situated halfway down the head. As usual for moths, the antennae do not have clubs; even in the males they are smooth or almost so and not at all comb-like. The antenna base bears a small brush of dense hairs and is flat, with a concave underside and may cover part of the compound eyes. The Blastobasidae have few or no bristles on the compound eyes, no ocelli, and probably lack chaetosemata too. The mouthparts are well-developed and moderately specialized, with 4-segmented folding maxillary palps, long labial palps and a long proboscis with a scaly base. The tibiae of the forelegs are enlarged at the end, those of the middle legs two spurs, and those of the hindlegs 4 spurs and many long thin hairs.

Wingspan in this family is about 12 to 24 mm, more than 10 times as much as the thorax width. The forewings lack a tornus and are about 4-5 times as long as they are wide, with a convex outer margin and a rather blunt tip. The round-tipped hindwings are very narrow, of equal or somewhat less length as the forewings, to which they are joined with a frenulum. The edge of the hindwings is surrounded by a fringe of hairs about two times as long as the wing is wide.

The wing venation of forewings and hindwings differs. The forewing has 12 veins altogether, with two anal veins – vein 1b and 1c, the former of which forks proximally – and a distally complete tubular vein (1c). The transverse vein is complete, and the discal cell has no tubular vein running through its middle. By contrast, the hindwings have seven or eight veins. Their anal veins are 1b and 1c like on the forewings; they lack vein 1a but also have the tubular vein 1c. Vein 1b may fork as in the forewings or remain unbranched, while a transverse vein may be present or not. Usually, five veins arise from the hindwing cell, of which the fourth and fifth are proximally joined; Blastobasis, however, might only have four cell veins, with veins 3 and 5 joined and vein 4 missing, but this is not universally accepted. Hindwing vein 8 either runs along the upper cell margin initially and anastomoses with it, or possibly it arises from the cell margin in some species, but in neither case does it run close to vein 7.

The caterpillars (larvae) have 10 prolegs and feed openly, usually on dead organic matter. Some species are pests of stored foodstuffs. The pupae are concealed and are not protruded during hatching.

== Genera ==
Most of the roughly 30 genera of the Blastobasidae presently recognized are small or even monotypic, though Auximobasis and Pigritia are fairly diverse and Blastobasis and Holcocera are quite large. Such an arrangement is suspicious of not representing the true phylogeny of the family adequately; with few species having been compared in sufficient detail in recent times, it is to be expected that as better data become available, the two large genera will be split, and/or several small genera will not be maintained as distinct. Thus, the following list is likely to change in the future:

- Blastobasinae Walsingham, 1894
  - Tribe Blastobasini
    - Auximobasis
    - Blastobasis
    - Mastema
    - Neoblastobasis
    - Zenodochium (sometimes in Blastobasis)
  - Tribe Pigritiini Dietz, 1910
    - Pigritia
  - Unplaced to tribe
    - Barbaloba
    - Coniogenes
    - Critoxena
    - Docostoma
    - Exinotis
    - Hallicis
    - Heredia
    - "Holcoceroides" Sinev, 1986 (non Strand, 1913: preoccupied)
    - Iconisma
    - Inbioxa
    - Koleps
    - Lateantenna
    - Metallocrates
    - Pheos
    - Prosintis
    - Pseudokoleps
    - Sirindhorn
    - Syncola
    - Xenopathia
- Holcocerinae Adamski, 1989
  - Asaphocrita
  - Calosima
  - Holcocera
  - Hypatopa (sometimes in Holcocera)
  - Pseudohypatopa
  - Tecmerium
