= Glyphidocera corniculae =

Scientific classification
- Kingdom: Animalia
- Phylum: Arthropoda
- Clade: Pancrustacea
- Class: Insecta
- Order: Lepidoptera
- Family: Autostichidae
- Genus: Glyphidocera
- Species: G. corniculae

Binomial name
- Glyphidocera corniculae Adamski, 2005

Species of moth

Glyphidocera corniculae is a moth in the family Autostichidae. It was described by Adamski in 2005. It is found in Costa Rica.
