= Glyphidocera lupae =

Scientific classification
- Kingdom: Animalia
- Phylum: Arthropoda
- Clade: Pancrustacea
- Class: Insecta
- Order: Lepidoptera
- Family: Autostichidae
- Genus: Glyphidocera
- Species: G. lupae

Binomial name
- Glyphidocera lupae Adamski, 2005

Species of moth

Glyphidocera lupae is a species of moth in the family Autostichidae. It was first described by David Adamski in 2005. It is found in Costa Rica.
