= Glyphidocera chungchinmookara =

Scientific classification
- Kingdom: Animalia
- Phylum: Arthropoda
- Clade: Pancrustacea
- Class: Insecta
- Order: Lepidoptera
- Family: Autostichidae
- Genus: Glyphidocera
- Species: G. chungchinmookara

Binomial name
- Glyphidocera chungchinmookara Adamski & Brown, 2001

Species of moth

Glyphidocera chungchinmookara is a moth in the family Autostichidae. It was described by Adamski and Brown in 2001. It is found in Venezuela.

The length of the forewings is 8.6–10 mm.
