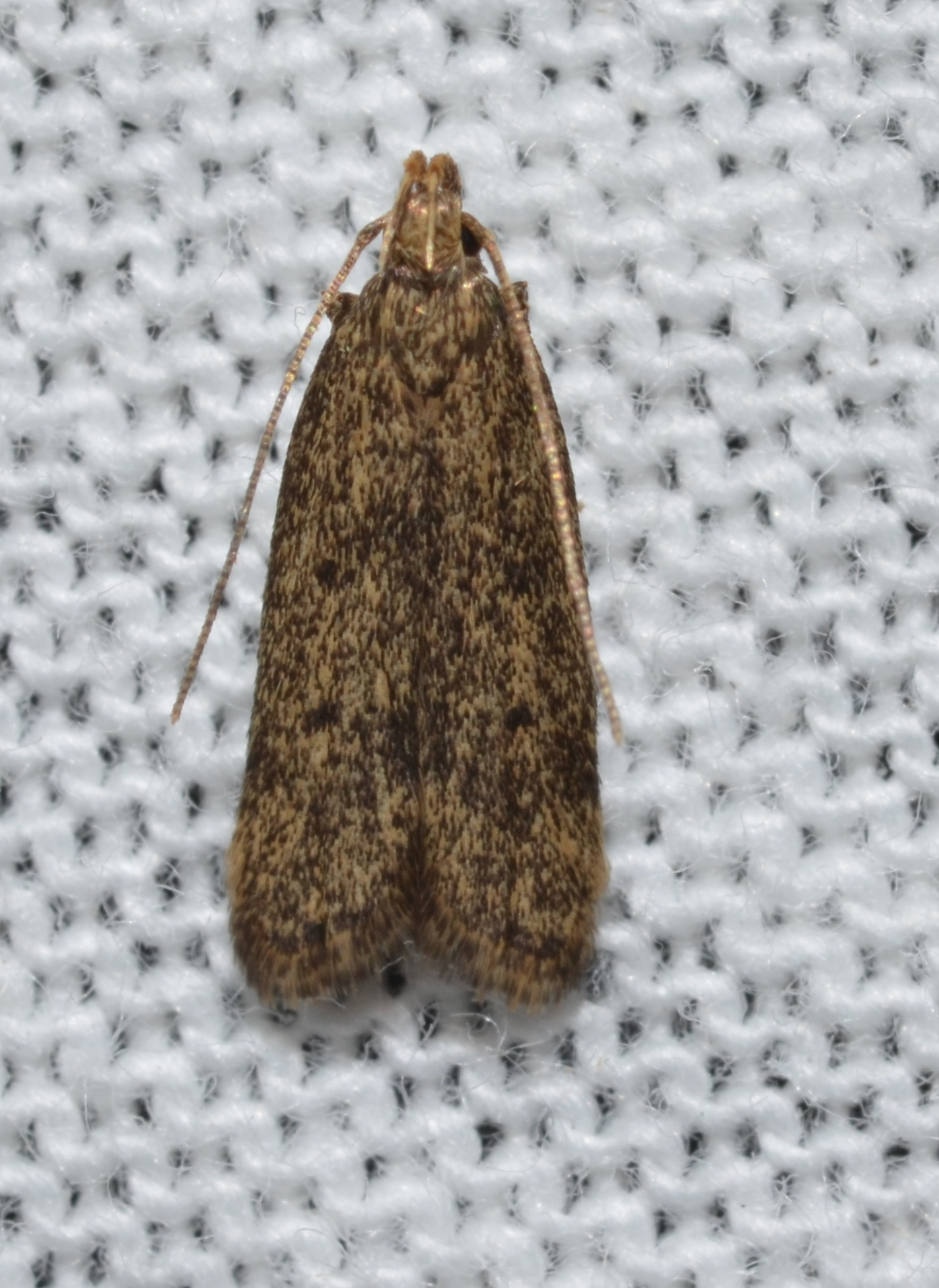

Scientific classification
- Kingdom: Animalia
- Phylum: Arthropoda
- Clade: Pancrustacea
- Class: Insecta
- Order: Lepidoptera
- Family: Autostichidae
- Genus: Glyphidocera
- Species: G. juniperella

Binomial name
- Glyphidocera juniperella Adamski, 1987

= Glyphidocera juniperella =

Species of moth

Glyphidocera juniperella, the juniper tip moth, is a moth of the family Autostichidae. It is found in North America, where it has been recorded from Alabama, Florida, Indiana, Louisiana, Maryland, Mississippi, Oklahoma, South Carolina, Tennessee and West Virginia.

The length of the forewings is 7-8.5 mm. Adults are on wing from March to October.

The larvae feed on Juniperus horizontalis.
