= Glyphidocera garveyi =

Scientific classification
- Kingdom: Animalia
- Phylum: Arthropoda
- Clade: Pancrustacea
- Class: Insecta
- Order: Lepidoptera
- Family: Autostichidae
- Genus: Glyphidocera
- Species: G. garveyi

Binomial name
- Glyphidocera garveyi Adamski & Brown, 2001

Species of moth

Glyphidocera garveyi is a moth in the family Autostichidae. It was described by Adamski and Brown in 2001. It is found in Venezuela.
