= Asaphocrita magae =

Scientific classification
- Kingdom: Animalia
- Phylum: Arthropoda
- Clade: Pancrustacea
- Class: Insecta
- Order: Lepidoptera
- Family: Blastobasidae
- Genus: Asaphocrita
- Species: A. magae

Binomial name
- Asaphocrita magae Adamski, 2002

Species of moth

Asaphocrita magae is a moth in the family Blastobasidae that is endemic to Costa Rica.
