= Glyphidocera rodriguezi =

Scientific classification
- Kingdom: Animalia
- Phylum: Arthropoda
- Clade: Pancrustacea
- Class: Insecta
- Order: Lepidoptera
- Family: Autostichidae
- Genus: Glyphidocera
- Species: G. rodriguezi

Binomial name
- Glyphidocera rodriguezi Adamski, 2005

Species of moth

Glyphidocera rodriguezi is a moth in the family Autostichidae. It was described by Adamski in 2005. It is found in Costa Rica.
