= Glyphidocera novercae =

Scientific classification
- Kingdom: Animalia
- Phylum: Arthropoda
- Clade: Pancrustacea
- Class: Insecta
- Order: Lepidoptera
- Family: Autostichidae
- Genus: Glyphidocera
- Species: G. novercae

Binomial name
- Glyphidocera novercae Adamski, 2005

Species of moth

Glyphidocera Novercae is a pale brownish yellow moth discovered in Costa Rica in 2005 by David Adamski. A member of the Autostichidae family the moth was located at 5 collection sites. G. Novercae (From Latin Noverca: stepmother) differs from Glyphidocera tibiae (Tibia: meaning reed pipe) also discovered by Adamski at similar collection sites. G. tibiae however has an absence of sex scales between abdominal terga 2–3 in the male and other differing attributes.
