= Glyphidocera digitella =

Scientific classification
- Kingdom: Animalia
- Phylum: Arthropoda
- Clade: Pancrustacea
- Class: Insecta
- Order: Lepidoptera
- Family: Autostichidae
- Genus: Glyphidocera
- Species: G. digitella

Binomial name
- Glyphidocera digitella Adamski & Brown, 2001

Species of moth

Glyphidocera digitella is a moth in the family Autostichidae. It was described by Adamski and Brown in 2001. It is found in Venezuela.

The length of the forewings is 4.9 mm.

== Etymology ==
The species name refers to the Latin word digitus (meaning finger).
