= Glyphidocera ranae =

Scientific classification
- Kingdom: Animalia
- Phylum: Arthropoda
- Class: Insecta
- Order: Lepidoptera
- Family: Autostichidae
- Genus: Glyphidocera
- Species: G. ranae

Binomial name
- Glyphidocera ranae Adamski, 2005

Species of moth

Glyphidocera ranae is a moth in the family Autostichidae. It was described by David Adamski in 2005. It is found in Costa Rica with records from three localities spanning much of the country.

The forewing length is 5.9–6.2 mm (0.23–0.24 in) for males.
