= Glyphidocera tibiae =

Scientific classification
- Kingdom: Animalia
- Phylum: Arthropoda
- Clade: Pancrustacea
- Class: Insecta
- Order: Lepidoptera
- Family: Autostichidae
- Genus: Glyphidocera
- Species: G. tibiae

Binomial name
- Glyphidocera tibiae Adamski, 2005

Species of moth

Glyphidocera tibiae (Tibia: meaning reed pipe) is a moth discovered at two collection sites in Costa Rica in 2005 by David Adamski. With coloring ranging from dark brown on the legs to pale brown hindwing and yellow brown undersurface it is similar to Glyphidocera Novercae (From Latin Noverca: stepmother) also found in Cost Rica around the same time. G. Noverae however has more yellowish features and a more protuberant ventral furca, among other differing features.
