= Glyphidocera nubis =

Scientific classification
- Kingdom: Animalia
- Phylum: Arthropoda
- Clade: Pancrustacea
- Class: Insecta
- Order: Lepidoptera
- Family: Autostichidae
- Genus: Glyphidocera
- Species: G. nubis

Binomial name
- Glyphidocera nubis Adamski, 2005

Species of moth

Glyphidocera nubis is a moth in the Autostichidae family. It was described by Adamski in 2005. It is found in Costa Rica.
