= Glyphidocera guaroa =

Scientific classification
- Kingdom: Animalia
- Phylum: Arthropoda
- Clade: Pancrustacea
- Class: Insecta
- Order: Lepidoptera
- Family: Autostichidae
- Genus: Glyphidocera
- Species: G. guaroa

Binomial name
- Glyphidocera guaroa Adamski, 2002

Species of moth

Glyphidocera guaroa is a moth in the family Autostichidae. It was described by Adamski in 2002. It is found in Costa Rica, where it ranges from the coastal Pacific to the coastal Caribbean, and from the western province of Guanacaste east to the southeastern province of Puntarenas near Panama.

== Etymology ==
The species is named for the Costa Rican liquor guaro, made from sugar cane.
