= Glyphidocera placentae =

Scientific classification
- Kingdom: Animalia
- Phylum: Arthropoda
- Clade: Pancrustacea
- Class: Insecta
- Order: Lepidoptera
- Family: Autostichidae
- Genus: Glyphidocera
- Species: G. placentae

Binomial name
- Glyphidocera placentae Adamski, 2005

Species of moth

Glyphidocera placentae is a moth in the family Autostichidae. Found in Costa Rica, it was described by David Adamski in 2005.
