= Asaphocrita laminae =

Scientific classification
- Kingdom: Animalia
- Phylum: Arthropoda
- Clade: Pancrustacea
- Class: Insecta
- Order: Lepidoptera
- Family: Blastobasidae
- Genus: Asaphocrita
- Species: A. laminae

Binomial name
- Asaphocrita laminae Adamski, 2002

Species of moth

Asaphocrita laminae is a moth in the family Blastobasidae that is endemic to Costa Rica.
