= Glyphidocera hamatella =

Scientific classification
- Kingdom: Animalia
- Phylum: Arthropoda
- Clade: Pancrustacea
- Class: Insecta
- Order: Lepidoptera
- Family: Autostichidae
- Genus: Glyphidocera
- Species: G. hamatella

Binomial name
- Glyphidocera hamatella Adamski & Brown, 2001

Species of moth

Glyphidocera hamatella is a moth in the family Autostichidae. It was described by Adamski and Brown in 2001. It is found in Venezuela.

== Etymology ==
The species name refers to the hooklike apical area of the costa of the valva and is derived from Latin hamatus (meaning hooked).
