= Glyphidocera hurlberti =

Scientific classification
- Kingdom: Animalia
- Phylum: Arthropoda
- Clade: Pancrustacea
- Class: Insecta
- Order: Lepidoptera
- Family: Autostichidae
- Genus: Glyphidocera
- Species: G. hurlberti

Binomial name
- Glyphidocera hurlberti Adamski, 2000

Species of moth

Glyphidocera hurlberti is a moth in the family Autostichidae. It was described by Adamski in 2000. It is found in North America, where it is found in Colorado and Alberta.

The wingspan is 17–19 mm. The forewings are greyish brown with four indistinct dark brown spots. The hindwings are pale brown.
