= Glyphidocera wrightorum =

Scientific classification
- Kingdom: Animalia
- Phylum: Arthropoda
- Clade: Pancrustacea
- Class: Insecta
- Order: Lepidoptera
- Family: Autostichidae
- Genus: Glyphidocera
- Species: G. wrightorum

Binomial name
- Glyphidocera wrightorum Adamski & Metzler, 2000

Species of moth

Glyphidocera wrightorum is a moth in the family Autostichidae. It was described by Adamski and Metzler in 2000. It is found in North America, where it has been recorded from Indiana and Ohio.
