= Glyphidocera orthoctenis =

Scientific classification
- Kingdom: Animalia
- Phylum: Arthropoda
- Class: Insecta
- Order: Lepidoptera
- Family: Autostichidae
- Genus: Glyphidocera
- Species: G. orthoctenis

Binomial name
- Glyphidocera orthoctenis Meyrick, 1923

Species of moth

Glyphidocera orthoctenis is a moth in the family Autostichidae. It was described by Edward Meyrick in 1923. It is found in Pará, Brazil.

The wingspan is about 11 mm. The forewings are pale yellow ochreous, more or less sprinkled with fuscous or dark fuscous. The discal stigmata are rather small, dark fuscous, the plical are little marked. The hindwings are light grey, suffused whitish ochreous on the anterior half.
