= Glyphidocera thyrsogastra =

Scientific classification
- Kingdom: Animalia
- Phylum: Arthropoda
- Class: Insecta
- Order: Lepidoptera
- Family: Autostichidae
- Genus: Glyphidocera
- Species: G. thyrsogastra

Binomial name
- Glyphidocera thyrsogastra Meyrick, 1929

Species of moth

Glyphidocera thyrsogastra is a moth in the family Autostichidae. It was described by Edward Meyrick in 1929. It is found in Peru.

The wingspan is about 11 mm (0.43 in). The forewings are light yellow ochreous, thinly sprinkled with fuscous. The discal stigmata are small and grey and there are three or four blackish dots on the termen. The hindwings are light grey.
