= Glyphidocera audax =

Scientific classification
- Domain: Eukaryota
- Kingdom: Animalia
- Phylum: Arthropoda
- Class: Insecta
- Order: Lepidoptera
- Family: Autostichidae
- Genus: Glyphidocera
- Species: G. audax

Binomial name
- Glyphidocera audax Walsingham, [1892]

Species of moth

Glyphidocera audax is a moth in the family Autostichidae. It was described by Thomas de Grey, 6th Baron Walsingham, in 1892. It is found in the West Indies.

The wingspan is about 16 mm. The forewings are dull fawn-brown, densely irrorated with fuscous scales throughout and with an elongate transverse fuscous spot before the middle, of which the lower extremity touches the fold. There is a smaller fuscous spot at the end of the cell and a few fuscous scales about the apical margin indicate the extremities of the veins. The hindwings are cinereous, with a slight fawn-brown shade from the base above their middle, as well as a narrow inconspicuous subfuscous band across the extreme apex.
