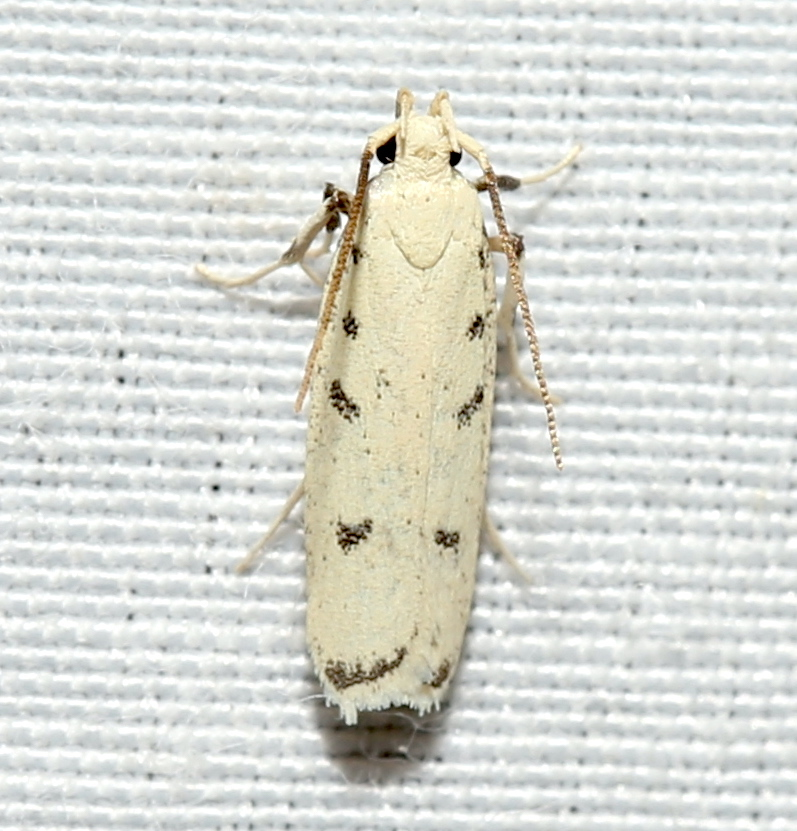

Scientific classification
- Kingdom: Animalia
- Phylum: Arthropoda
- Clade: Pancrustacea
- Class: Insecta
- Order: Lepidoptera
- Family: Autostichidae
- Genus: Glyphidocera
- Species: G. lactiflosella

Binomial name
- Glyphidocera lactiflosella (Chambers, 1878)

Synonyms
- Gelechia lactiflosella Chambers, 1878; Trichotaphe lactiflosella

= Glyphidocera lactiflosella =

Species of moth

Glyphidocera lactiflosella, the five-spotted glyphidocera moth, is a moth in the family Autostichidae. It was described by Vactor Tousey Chambers in 1878. It is found in North America, where it has been recorded from Alabama, Arkansas, Florida, Georgia, Louisiana, Maine, Mississippi, North Carolina, South Carolina, Tennessee and Texas.

The wingspan is about 12.7 mm. The forewings are pale cream color, sparsely dusted with brown, and a small brown spot touching the fold above, close to the base of the wing, another a little further back, near the middle two spots, one on the fold, the other on the disc. These two last spots are sometimes confluent. There is a transverse brown streak at the end of the cell, and a distinct brown line curving around the base of the apical cilia. The hindwings are white, tinged with silvery. Adults are on wing from January to October.
