= Glyphidocera cryphiodes =

Scientific classification
- Kingdom: Animalia
- Phylum: Arthropoda
- Class: Insecta
- Order: Lepidoptera
- Family: Autostichidae
- Genus: Glyphidocera
- Species: G. cryphiodes

Binomial name
- Glyphidocera cryphiodes (Meyrick, 1918)

Synonyms
- Harpagandra cryphiodes Meyrick, 1918

Species of moth

Glyphidocera cryphiodes is a moth in the family Autostichidae. It was described by Edward Meyrick in 1918. It is found in Guyana.

The wingspan is about 13 mm. The forewings are dark fuscous, faintly purplish tinged. The hindwings are dark grey.
