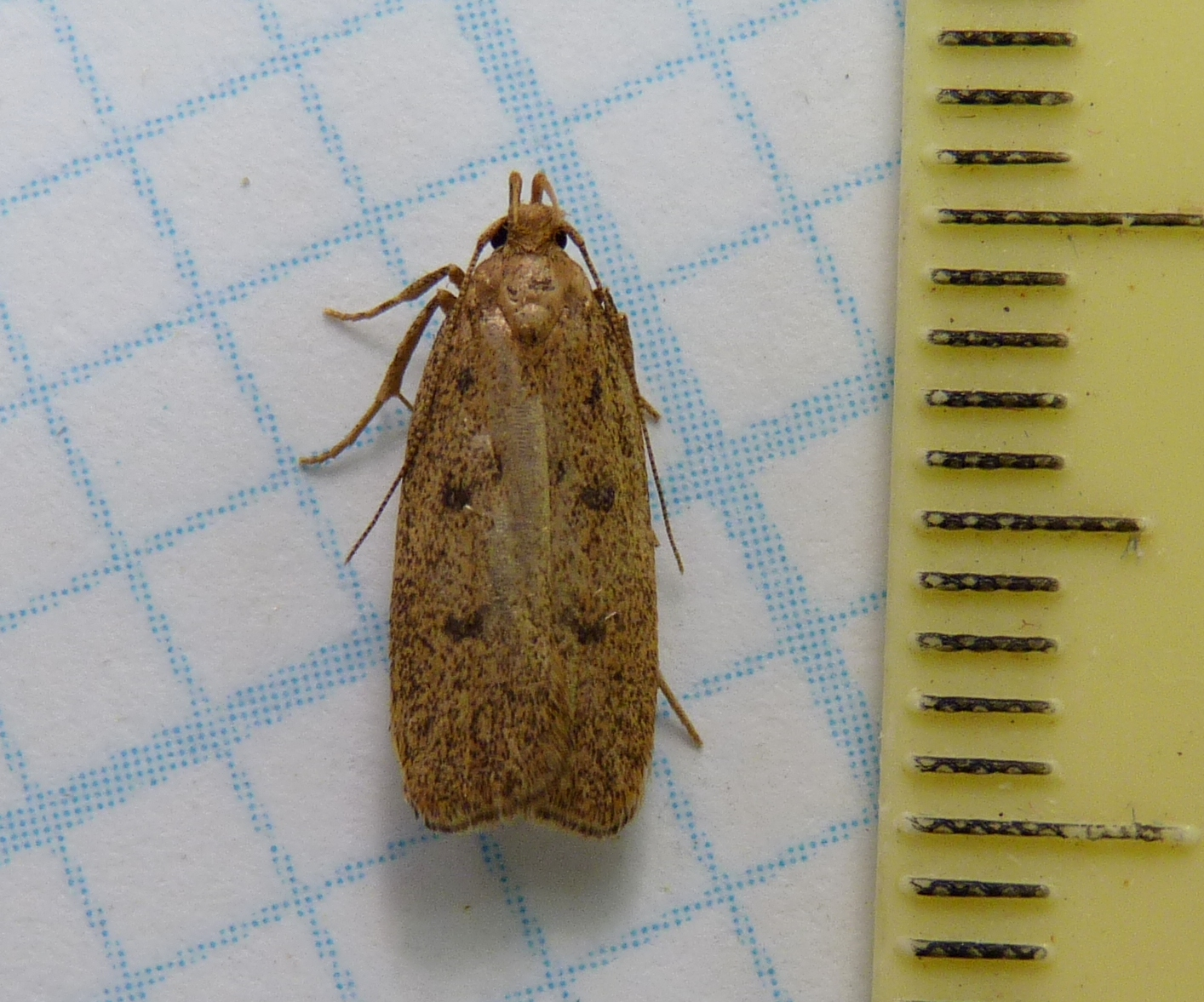

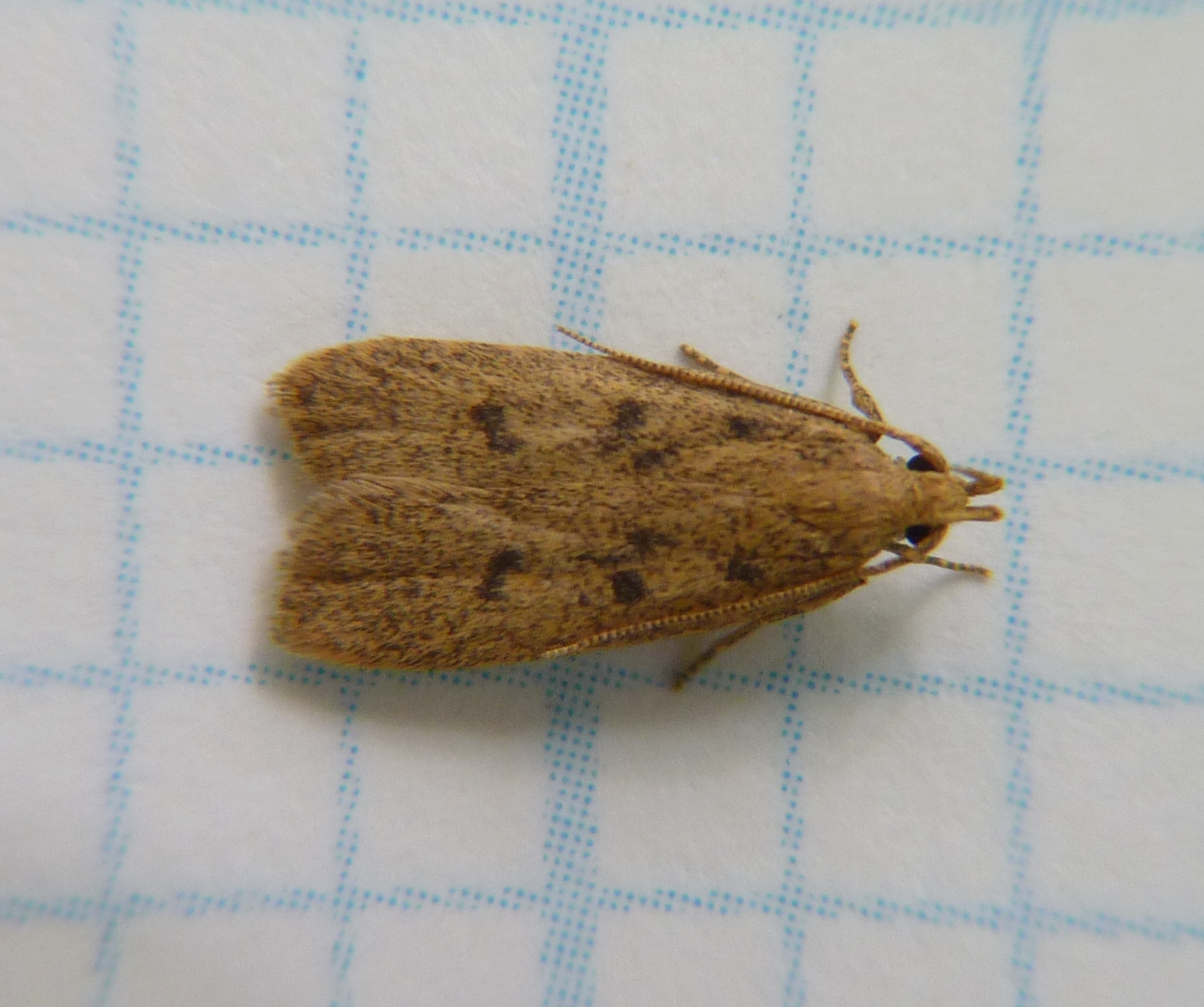

Scientific classification
- Kingdom: Animalia
- Phylum: Arthropoda
- Clade: Pancrustacea
- Class: Insecta
- Order: Lepidoptera
- Family: Autostichidae
- Genus: Glyphidocera
- Species: G. septentrionella

Binomial name
- Glyphidocera septentrionella Busck, 1904

Synonyms
- Glyphidocera speratella Busck, 1908; Glyphidocera isonephes Meyrick, 1929

= Glyphidocera septentrionella =

Species of moth

Glyphidocera septentrionella is a moth of the family Autostichidae. It is known from North America, including British Columbia, California, Illinois, New York, Oklahoma, Pennsylvania, South Carolina and Texas.

The wingspan is 18–19 mm. The antennae are yellowish fuscous and the face and head are yellowish. The thorax and forewings are yellowish fuscous, evenly sprinkled with black scales. There is a very faint blackish round spot on the basal part of the cell and a similar one somewhat more pronounced on the middle of the cell and a double one at the end of the cell. The hindwings are yellowish fuscous.
