= Asaphocrita busckiella =

Scientific classification
- Domain: Eukaryota
- Kingdom: Animalia
- Phylum: Arthropoda
- Class: Insecta
- Order: Lepidoptera
- Family: Blastobasidae
- Genus: Asaphocrita
- Species: A. busckiella

Binomial name
- Asaphocrita busckiella (Dietz, 1910)

Synonyms
- Holcocera busckiella Dietz, 1910

Species of moth

Asaphocrita busckiella is a moth in the family Blastobasidae. It is found in North America, including Maryland, Maine, New Brunswick, Ontario, Quebec and Tennessee.
