= Glyphidocera bifissa =

Scientific classification
- Kingdom: Animalia
- Phylum: Arthropoda
- Class: Insecta
- Order: Lepidoptera
- Family: Autostichidae
- Genus: Glyphidocera
- Species: G. bifissa

Binomial name
- Glyphidocera bifissa (Meyrick, 1930)

Synonyms
- Stibarenches bifissa Meyrick, 1930

Species of moth

Glyphidocera bifissa is a moth in the family Autostichidae. It was described by Edward Meyrick in 1930. It is found in Amazonas, Brazil.
