= Glyphidocera carribea =

Scientific classification
- Domain: Eukaryota
- Kingdom: Animalia
- Phylum: Arthropoda
- Class: Insecta
- Order: Lepidoptera
- Family: Autostichidae
- Genus: Glyphidocera
- Species: G. carribea

Binomial name
- Glyphidocera carribea Busck, 1911

Species of moth

Glyphidocera carribea is a moth in the family Autostichidae. It was described by August Busck in 1911. It is found in Trinidad.
