= Asaphocrita obsoletella =

Scientific classification
- Domain: Eukaryota
- Kingdom: Animalia
- Phylum: Arthropoda
- Class: Insecta
- Order: Lepidoptera
- Family: Blastobasidae
- Genus: Asaphocrita
- Species: A. obsoletella

Binomial name
- Asaphocrita obsoletella (Krogerus, 1947)

Synonyms
- Blastobasis obsoletella Krogerus, 1947

Species of moth

Asaphocrita obsoletella is a moth in the family Blastobasidae which is endemic to Finland.
