= Asaphocrita estriatella =

Scientific classification
- Domain: Eukaryota
- Kingdom: Animalia
- Phylum: Arthropoda
- Class: Insecta
- Order: Lepidoptera
- Family: Blastobasidae
- Genus: Asaphocrita
- Species: A. estriatella

Binomial name
- Asaphocrita estriatella (Dietz, 1910)

Synonyms
- Holcocera estriatella Dietz, 1910; Holcocerina simuloides McDunnough, 1961

Species of moth

Asaphocrita estriatella is a moth in the family Blastobasidae. It is found in North America, including Nova Scotia, Massachusetts and Maine.
