= Asaphocrita protypica =

Scientific classification
- Kingdom: Animalia
- Phylum: Arthropoda
- Class: Insecta
- Order: Lepidoptera
- Family: Blastobasidae
- Genus: Asaphocrita
- Species: A. protypica

Binomial name
- Asaphocrita protypica Meyrick, 1931

Species of moth

Asaphocrita protypica is a moth in the family Blastobasidae. It is found in the United States, including Texas and New Mexico.
