= Glyphidocera lithodoxa =

Scientific classification
- Kingdom: Animalia
- Phylum: Arthropoda
- Class: Insecta
- Order: Lepidoptera
- Family: Autostichidae
- Genus: Glyphidocera
- Species: G. lithodoxa

Binomial name
- Glyphidocera lithodoxa Meyrick, 1929

Species of moth

Glyphidocera lithodoxa is a moth in the family Autostichidae. It was described by Edward Meyrick in 1929. It is found in North America, where it has been recorded from Maine, Massachusetts, Ontario, Pennsylvania and Texas.

The wingspan is 14–15 mm. The forewings are pale grayish ocherous sprinkled with gray. The stigmata are gray, the plical and first discal small, indistinct or obsolete, the plical rather anterior, the second discal moderately large, round and distinct. The hindwings are gray whitish, towards the apex suffused with pale gray.
