= Glyphidocera rhypara =

Scientific classification
- Domain: Eukaryota
- Kingdom: Animalia
- Phylum: Arthropoda
- Class: Insecta
- Order: Lepidoptera
- Family: Autostichidae
- Genus: Glyphidocera
- Species: G. rhypara

Binomial name
- Glyphidocera rhypara Walsingham, 1911

Species of moth

Glyphidocera rhypara is a moth in the family Autostichidae. It was described by Thomas de Grey, 6th Baron Walsingham, in 1911. It is found in Mexico (Sonora, Guerrero).

The wingspan is 14–15 mm. The forewings are pale fawn-ochreous, minutely dusted with fuscous. A fuscous spot near the base on the upper edge of the fold is succeeded by a second spot in the middle of the fold, a third lying in the disc above and a little beyond it. A fourth spot at the end of the cell is produced downwards to its lower angle somewhat obliquely inward. A slight fuscous shade occurs along the termen and at the apex, and is reduplicated in the middle of the pale fawn-ochreous cilia. The hindwings are pale cinereous.
