= Glyphidocera reparabilis =

Scientific classification
- Domain: Eukaryota
- Kingdom: Animalia
- Phylum: Arthropoda
- Class: Insecta
- Order: Lepidoptera
- Family: Autostichidae
- Genus: Glyphidocera
- Species: G. reparabilis

Binomial name
- Glyphidocera reparabilis Walsingham, 1911

Species of moth

Glyphidocera reparabilis is a moth in the family Autostichidae. It was described by Thomas de Grey, 6th Baron Walsingham, in 1911. It is found in Panama.

The wingspan is 9–10 mm. Its forewings are pale fawn, but so profusely sprinkled with brownish fuscous that the paler ground-colour is almost entirely obliterated. The discal spots on its wings are perceptible, one is near the base, one, larger, before the middle, and one at the end of the cell, all dark fuscous. The hindwings are pale brownish grey, with no considerable thickening near the flexus.
