= Glyphidocera dimorphella =

Scientific classification
- Domain: Eukaryota
- Kingdom: Animalia
- Phylum: Arthropoda
- Class: Insecta
- Order: Lepidoptera
- Family: Autostichidae
- Genus: Glyphidocera
- Species: G. dimorphella

Binomial name
- Glyphidocera dimorphella Busck, 1907

Species of moth

Glyphidocera dimorphella is a moth in the family Autostichidae. It was described by August Busck in 1907. It is found in North America, where it has been recorded from Florida, Maine, Maryland, New Hampshire, South Carolina and Texas.

The wingspan is 10–11 mm. The forewings are light straw yellow, sparsely sprinkled with dark brown atoms, with a blackish brown round dot on the middle of the cell, another similar dot at the end of the cell and a more or less complete series of blackish-brown dots along the terminal edge of the wing. The hindwings are light straw colored.
