= Glyphidocera percnoleuca =

Scientific classification
- Kingdom: Animalia
- Phylum: Arthropoda
- Class: Insecta
- Order: Lepidoptera
- Family: Autostichidae
- Genus: Glyphidocera
- Species: G. percnoleuca

Binomial name
- Glyphidocera percnoleuca Meyrick, 1923

Species of moth

Glyphidocera percnoleuca is a moth in the family Autostichidae. It was described by Edward Meyrick in 1923. It is found in Brazil.

The wingspan is about 10 mm. The forewings are pale fuscous irrorated (sprinkled) with dark fuscous. The discal stigmata are cloudy and dark fuscous. The hindwings are ochreous whitish.
