= Asaphocrita plummerella =

Scientific classification
- Domain: Eukaryota
- Kingdom: Animalia
- Phylum: Arthropoda
- Class: Insecta
- Order: Lepidoptera
- Family: Blastobasidae
- Genus: Asaphocrita
- Species: A. plummerella

Binomial name
- Asaphocrita plummerella (Dietze, 1910)

Synonyms
- Blastobasis plummerella Dietze, 1910

Species of moth

Asaphocrita plummerella is a moth in the family Blastobasidae. It is found in the United States, including Maryland, Tennessee and Maine.
