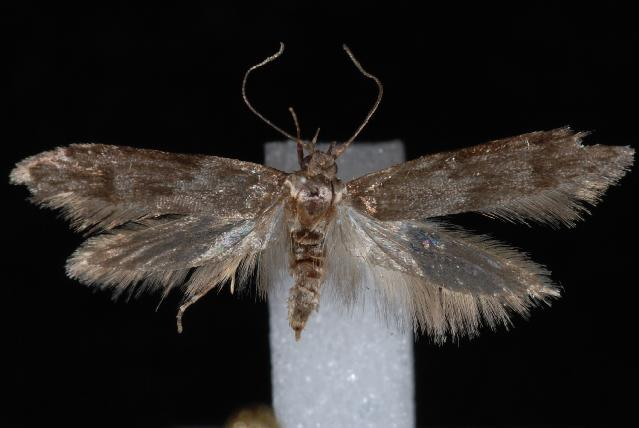
- Asaphocrita aphidiella

Scientific classification
- Domain: Eukaryota
- Kingdom: Animalia
- Phylum: Arthropoda
- Class: Insecta
- Order: Lepidoptera
- Family: Blastobasidae
- Subfamily: Holcocerinae
- Genus: Asaphocrita; Meyrick, 1931

Synonyms
- Holcocerina McDunnough, 1961

= Asaphocrita =

Moth genus in family Blastobasidae

Asaphocrita is a genus of moths in the family Blastobasidae.

== Species ==
- Asaphocrita alogiae
- Asaphocrita amatricis
- Asaphocrita animulae
- Asaphocrita aphidiella
- Asaphocrita arcis
- Asaphocrita aulae
- Asaphocrita aurae
- Asaphocrita blattae
- Asaphocrita busckiella
- Asaphocrita catenae
- Asaphocrita cenae
- Asaphocrita collyrae
- Asaphocrita coronae
- Asaphocrita deae
- Asaphocrita erae
- Asaphocrita estriatella
- Asaphocrita fidei
- Asaphocrita furciferae
- Asaphocrita fuscopurpurella
- Asaphocrita gazae
- Asaphocrita gerrulae
- Asaphocrita irenica
- Asaphocrita laminae
- Asaphocrita lucis
- Asaphocrita lunae
- Asaphocrita magae
- Asaphocrita maximae
- Asaphocrita obsoletella
- Asaphocrita opellae
- Asaphocrita pallae
- Asaphocrita pineae (Amsel, 1962)
- Asaphocrita plagiatella
- Asaphocrita planetae
- Asaphocrita plummerella
- Asaphocrita protypica
- Asaphocrita quietis
- Asaphocrita rationis
- Asaphocrita reginae
- Asaphocrita sciaphilella
- Asaphocrita spei
- Asaphocrita stellae
- Asaphocrita umbrae
- Asaphocrita viraginis
- Asaphocrita vitae
