= Glyphidocera recticostella =

Scientific classification
- Domain: Eukaryota
- Kingdom: Animalia
- Phylum: Arthropoda
- Class: Insecta
- Order: Lepidoptera
- Family: Autostichidae
- Genus: Glyphidocera
- Species: G. recticostella

Binomial name
- Glyphidocera recticostella Walsingham, 1897

Species of moth

Glyphidocera recticostella is a moth in the family Autostichidae. It was described by Thomas de Grey, 6th Baron Walsingham, in 1897. It is found in the West Indies, where it has been recorded from Grenada.

The wingspan is 23–25 mm. The forewings are greyish fuscous with a slight purplish tinge and a very faint indication of a dark spot at the end of the cell. The hindwings are greyish brown.
