= Asaphocrita fuscopurpurella =

Scientific classification
- Domain: Eukaryota
- Kingdom: Animalia
- Phylum: Arthropoda
- Class: Insecta
- Order: Lepidoptera
- Family: Blastobasidae
- Genus: Asaphocrita
- Species: A. fuscopurpurella

Binomial name
- Asaphocrita fuscopurpurella (Dietz, 1910)

Synonyms
- Blastobasis plummerella var. fuscopurpurella Dietz, 1910

Species of moth

Asaphocrita fuscopurpurella is a moth in the family Blastobasidae. It is found in the United States, including Maryland where the species was described from Plummers Island.
