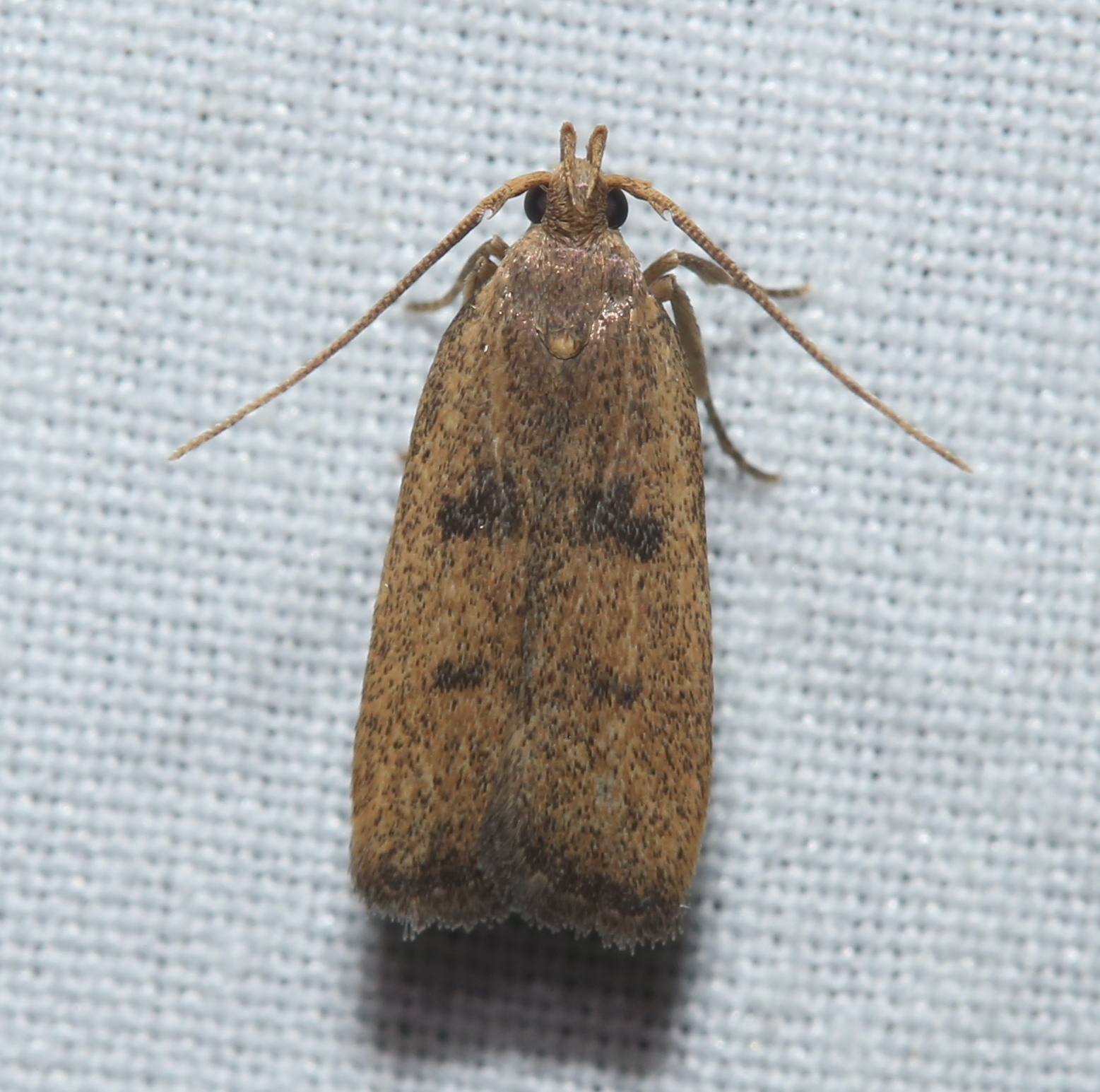

Scientific classification
- Kingdom: Animalia
- Phylum: Arthropoda
- Class: Insecta
- Order: Lepidoptera
- Family: Autostichidae
- Genus: Glyphidocera
- Species: G. democratica

Binomial name
- Glyphidocera democratica Meyrick, 1929

= Glyphidocera democratica =

Species of moth

Glyphidocera democratica is a moth in the family Autostichidae. It was described by Edward Meyrick in 1929. It is found in North America, where it has been recorded from Alabama, Arkansas, Florida, Kentucky, Louisiana, Mississippi, North Carolina, Tennessee, Texas and West Virginia.

The wingspan is 16–18 mm.
