= Asaphocrita pineae =

Scientific classification
- Domain: Eukaryota
- Kingdom: Animalia
- Phylum: Arthropoda
- Class: Insecta
- Order: Lepidoptera
- Family: Blastobasidae
- Genus: Asaphocrita
- Species: A. pineae

Binomial name
- Asaphocrita pineae (Amsel, 1962)

Synonyms
- Holcocera pineae Amsel, 1962

Species of moth

Asaphocrita pineae is a moth in the family Blastobasidae. It was described by Hans Georg Amsel in 1962. It is found in Guatemala.
