= Glyphidocera inurbana =

Scientific classification
- Kingdom: Animalia
- Phylum: Arthropoda
- Class: Insecta
- Order: Lepidoptera
- Family: Autostichidae
- Genus: Glyphidocera
- Species: G. inurbana

Binomial name
- Glyphidocera inurbana Meyrick, 1914

Species of moth

Glyphidocera inurbana is a moth in the family Autostichidae. It was described by Edward Meyrick in 1914. It is found in Guyana.

The wingspan is 12–16 mm. The forewings are greyish ochreous, irrorated (sprinkled) with dark fuscous. There is a cloudy dark fuscous dot in the disc at one-fourth. The stigmata are cloudy, dark fuscous, the plical rather obliquely before the first discal, the second discal transverse. The hindwings are grey.
