= Glyphidocera barythyma =

Scientific classification
- Kingdom: Animalia
- Phylum: Arthropoda
- Class: Insecta
- Order: Lepidoptera
- Family: Autostichidae
- Genus: Glyphidocera
- Species: G. barythyma

Binomial name
- Glyphidocera barythyma Meyrick, 1929

Species of moth

Glyphidocera barythyma is a moth in the family Autostichidae. It was described by Edward Meyrick in 1929. It is found in North America, where it has been recorded from Florida, Indiana and Texas.

The wingspan is 13–15 mm.
