= Glyphidocera trachyacma =

Scientific classification
- Kingdom: Animalia
- Phylum: Arthropoda
- Class: Insecta
- Order: Lepidoptera
- Family: Autostichidae
- Genus: Glyphidocera
- Species: G. trachyacma

Binomial name
- Glyphidocera trachyacma Meyrick, 1931

Species of moth

Glyphidocera trachyacma is a moth in the family Autostichidae. It was described by Edward Meyrick in 1931. It is found in Brazil.
