= Glyphidocera stenomorpha =

Scientific classification
- Kingdom: Animalia
- Phylum: Arthropoda
- Class: Insecta
- Order: Lepidoptera
- Family: Autostichidae
- Genus: Glyphidocera
- Species: G. stenomorpha

Binomial name
- Glyphidocera stenomorpha Meyrick, 1923

Species of moth

Glyphidocera stenomorpha is a moth in the family Autostichidae. It was described by Edward Meyrick in 1923. It is found in Suriname.

The wingspan is about 13 mm. The forewings are light yellow ochreous with a few fuscous specks. The stigmata form small fuscous dots or marks, the plical obliquely before the first discal. There is a slender terminal streak of rather dark fuscous suffusion. The hindwings are grey.
