= Glyphidocera perobscura =

Scientific classification
- Domain: Eukaryota
- Kingdom: Animalia
- Phylum: Arthropoda
- Class: Insecta
- Order: Lepidoptera
- Family: Autostichidae
- Genus: Glyphidocera
- Species: G. perobscura

Binomial name
- Glyphidocera perobscura Walsingham, 1911

Species of moth

Glyphidocera perobscura is a moth in the family Autostichidae. It was described by Thomas de Grey, 6th Baron Walsingham, in 1911. It is found in Mexico (Tabasco).

The wingspan is about 12 mm. The forewings are brownish fuscous, with a scarcely perceptible indication of three darker discal spots. The hindwings are rather paler than the forewings, brownish fuscous.
