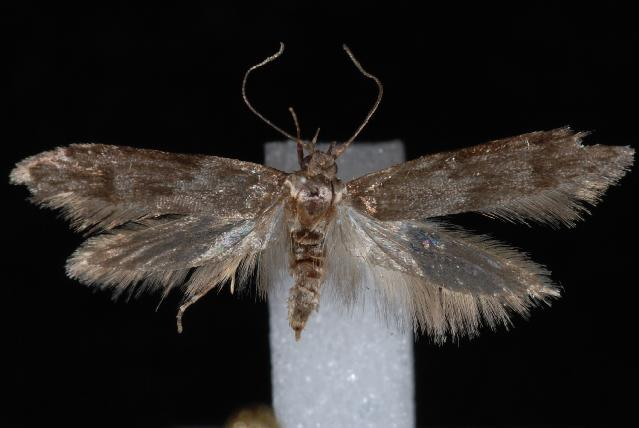

Scientific classification
- Domain: Eukaryota
- Kingdom: Animalia
- Phylum: Arthropoda
- Class: Insecta
- Order: Lepidoptera
- Family: Blastobasidae
- Genus: Asaphocrita
- Species: A. aphidiella

Binomial name
- Asaphocrita aphidiella (Walsingham, 1907)

Synonyms
- Holcocera aphidiella Walsingham, 1907; Blastobasis aphidiella; Holcocera cardinella Dietz (manuscript name); Holcocera dives Dietz, 1910; Holcocera dives var. basipallidella Dietz, 1910; Holcocera confluentella Dietz, 1910; Holcocera simplicis McDunnough, 1961

= Asaphocrita aphidiella =

Species of moth

Asaphocrita aphidiella is a moth in the family Blastobasidae. It is found in North America, including British Columbia, Washington, California, Manitoba, Ontario, Quebec, Maine, New Hampshire and Ohio.

The wingspan is about 15 mm.

Larvae have been reared on the contents of Phylloxera galls on hickory.
