= Glyphidocera elpista =

Scientific classification
- Domain: Eukaryota
- Kingdom: Animalia
- Phylum: Arthropoda
- Class: Insecta
- Order: Lepidoptera
- Family: Autostichidae
- Genus: Glyphidocera
- Species: G. elpista

Binomial name
- Glyphidocera elpista Walsingham, 1911

Species of moth

Glyphidocera elpista is a moth in the family Autostichidae. It was described by Thomas de Grey, 6th Baron Walsingham, in 1911. It is found in Panama.

The wingspan is about 10 mm. The forewings are fawn-ochreous, thickly sprinkled with fuscous, especially on the outer third. The discal spots are but faintly indicated, the median spot reaching to the fold, the outer one, slightly more distinct, at the end of the cell. The hindwings are brownish grey.
