= Glyphidocera umbrata =

Scientific classification
- Domain: Eukaryota
- Kingdom: Animalia
- Phylum: Arthropoda
- Class: Insecta
- Order: Lepidoptera
- Family: Autostichidae
- Genus: Glyphidocera
- Species: G. umbrata

Binomial name
- Glyphidocera umbrata Walsingham, 1911

Species of moth

Glyphidocera umbrata is a moth in the family Autostichidae. It was described by Thomas de Grey, 6th Baron Walsingham, in 1911. It is found in Guatemala.

The wingspan is about 16 mm. The forewings are dark greyish brown with paler brownish cinereous sprinkling about the basal third, across the wing-middle, and narrowly across the apical fifth in a line parallel to the termen. The hindwings are pale brownish cinereous.
