= Glyphidocera meyrickella =

Scientific classification
- Domain: Eukaryota
- Kingdom: Animalia
- Phylum: Arthropoda
- Class: Insecta
- Order: Lepidoptera
- Family: Autostichidae
- Genus: Glyphidocera
- Species: G. meyrickella

Binomial name
- Glyphidocera meyrickella Busck, 1907

Species of moth

Glyphidocera meyrickella is a moth in the family Autostichidae. It was described by August Busck in 1907. It is found in North America, where it has been recorded from Florida, Maine, Maryland, Oklahoma and South Carolina.

The wingspan is 14–15 mm. The forewings are ochreous, evenly and profusely sprinkled with black scales and with a blackish discal spot on the middle of the cell and another at the end of the cell.
