= Glyphidocera crocogramma =

Scientific classification
- Kingdom: Animalia
- Phylum: Arthropoda
- Class: Insecta
- Order: Lepidoptera
- Family: Autostichidae
- Genus: Glyphidocera
- Species: G. crocogramma

Binomial name
- Glyphidocera crocogramma Meyrick, 1923

Species of moth

Glyphidocera crocogramma is a moth in the family Autostichidae. It was described by Edward Meyrick in 1923. It is found in Brazil.

The wingspan is about 13 mm. The forewings are pale ochreous sprinkled with rather dark fuscous. The discal stigmata form small cloudy dark fuscous spots, the plical less defined, somewhat before the first discal. The hindwings are whitish, tinged with grey posteriorly and with a light ochreous-yellow streak along vein 1c from the base to beyond the middle.
