= Glyphidocera catectis =

Scientific classification
- Kingdom: Animalia
- Phylum: Arthropoda
- Class: Insecta
- Order: Lepidoptera
- Family: Autostichidae
- Genus: Glyphidocera
- Species: G. catectis

Binomial name
- Glyphidocera catectis Meyrick, 1923

Species of moth

Glyphidocera catectis is a moth in the family Autostichidae. It was described by Edward Meyrick in 1923. It is found in Ecuador.

The wingspan is about 12 mm. The forewings are ochreous irrorated (sprinkled) with fuscous with a rather large transverse-oval fuscous spot in the disc at two-fifths, and a smaller transverse spot at two-thirds, the space between these clearer ochreous. The hindwings are pale grey, the basal half suffused with ochreous whitish and partially clothed with modified scales.
