= Glyphidocera plicata =

Scientific classification
- Domain: Eukaryota
- Kingdom: Animalia
- Phylum: Arthropoda
- Class: Insecta
- Order: Lepidoptera
- Family: Autostichidae
- Genus: Glyphidocera
- Species: G. plicata

Binomial name
- Glyphidocera plicata (Walsingham, 1911)

Synonyms
- Ptilostonychia plicata Walsingham, 1911

Species of moth

Glyphidocera plicata is a moth in the family Autostichidae. It was described by Thomas de Grey, 6th Baron Walsingham, in 1911. It is found in Panama.

The wingspan is about 13 mm. The forewings are purplish fuscous, more especially at the base and along the upper side of the fold, fading to dark fawn-brown outwardly with a slight tinge of brownish ochreous towards the tornus. The only mark is a faint indication of a dark spot at the end of the cell. The hindwings are dark brown, tending to brownish ochreous on the flexal area.
