= Glyphidocera floridanella =

Scientific classification
- Domain: Eukaryota
- Kingdom: Animalia
- Phylum: Arthropoda
- Class: Insecta
- Order: Lepidoptera
- Family: Autostichidae
- Genus: Glyphidocera
- Species: G. floridanella

Binomial name
- Glyphidocera floridanella Busck, 1901

Species of moth

Glyphidocera floridanella is a moth in the family Autostichidae. It was described by August Busck in 1901. It is found in North America, where it has been recorded from Florida and Georgia.

The wingspan is 13.5–15 mm. The forewings are light yellowish fuscous, thickly overlaid with dark blackish brown and with a purple sheen. The dark scales segregate into large, ill-defined patches, one occupying nearly the entire basal third of the wing and most prominent at the dorsal basal third, another forming an obscure transverse band across the wing at the apical third, and a third occupying the apical portion of the wing. The intervals between these patches show the lighter ground color sprinkled with numerous single dark scales. The hindwings are dark grey.
