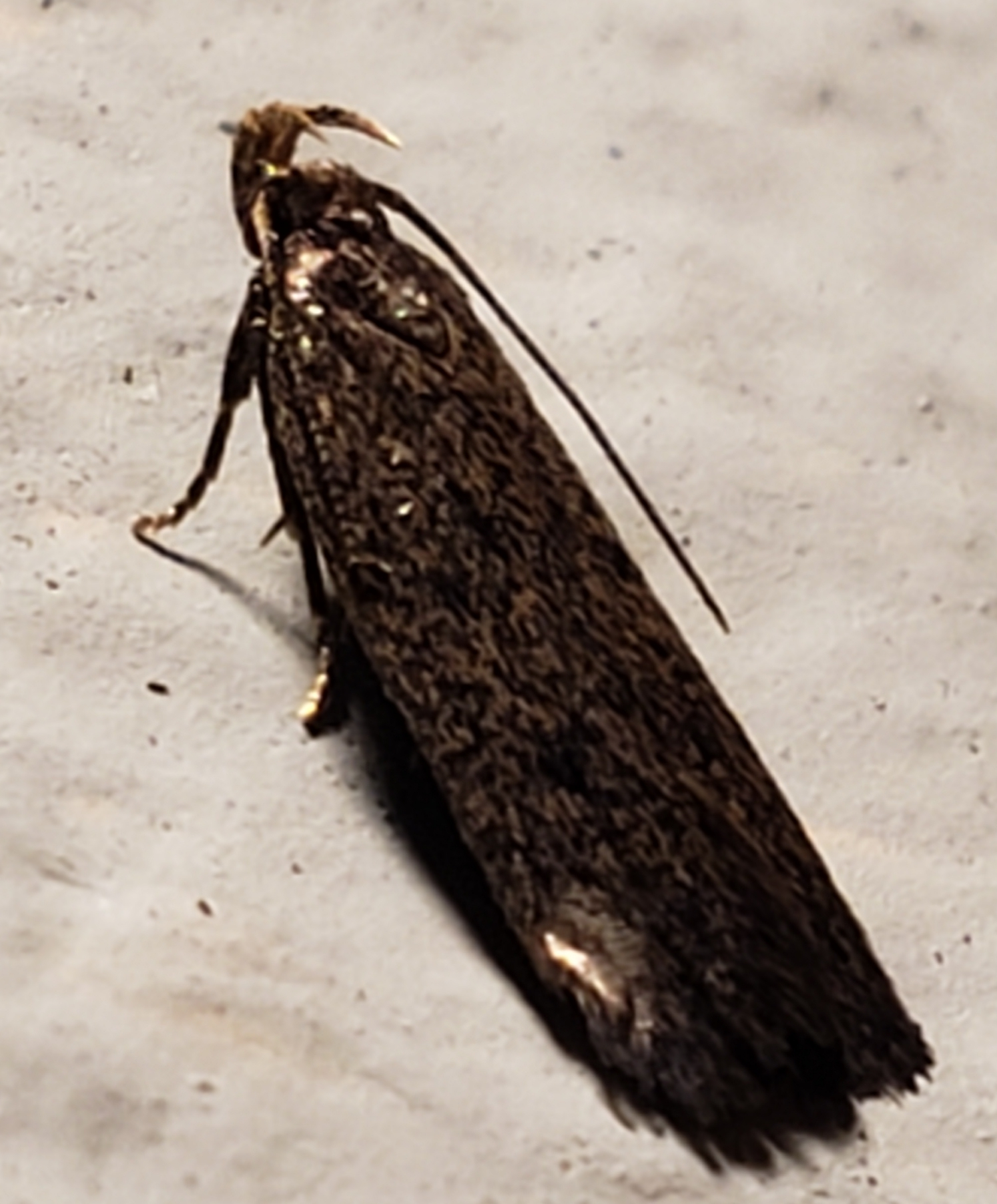

Scientific classification
- Domain: Eukaryota
- Kingdom: Animalia
- Phylum: Arthropoda
- Class: Insecta
- Order: Lepidoptera
- Family: Autostichidae
- Subfamily: Glyphidocerinae
- Genus: Glyphidocera; Walsingham, [1892]

Synonyms
- Ptilostonychia Walsingham, 1911; Harpagandra Meyrick, 1918; Stibarenches Meyrick, 1930

= Glyphidocera =

Genus of moths

Glyphidocera is a genus of moths in the family Autostichidae.

== Species ==
- Glyphidocera abiasta Meyrick, 1936
- Glyphidocera acuminae Adamski & Brown, 2001
- Glyphidocera adrogantiae Adamski, 2005
- Glyphidocera advenae Adamski, 2005
- Glyphidocera aediculae Adamski, 2005
- Glyphidocera aedis Adamski, 2005
- Glyphidocera alexandrae Adamski & Brown, 2001
- Glyphidocera ambrosiae Adamski, 2005
- Glyphidocera amitae Adamski, 2005
- Glyphidocera ancillae Adamski, 2005
- Glyphidocera animae Adamski, 2005
- Glyphidocera asymmetricae Adamski, 2005
- Glyphidocera arae Adamski, 2005
- Glyphidocera arakawae Adamski, 2005
- Glyphidocera arenae Adamski, 2005
- Glyphidocera audaciae Adamski, 2005
- Glyphidocera audax Walsingham, [1892]
- Glyphidocera barbae Adamski, 2005
- Glyphidocera barythyma Meyrick, 1929
- Glyphidocera basipunctella Adamski & Brown, 2001
- Glyphidocera bifissa (Meyrick, 1930)
- Glyphidocera brevisella Adamski & Brown, 2001
- Glyphidocera brocha Adamski & Brown, 2001
- Glyphidocera brumae Adamski, 2005
- Glyphidocera brunnella Adamski & Brown, 2001
- Glyphidocera burpurae Adamski, 2005
- Glyphidocera capraria Meyrick, 1929
- Glyphidocera capsae Adamski, 2005
- Glyphidocera carribea Busck, 1911
- Glyphidocera castanella Adamski & Brown, 2001
- Glyphidocera catectis Meyrick, 1923
- Glyphidocera cauponae Adamski, 2005
- Glyphidocera caveae Adamski, 2005
- Glyphidocera cellae Adamski, 2005
- Glyphidocera cenae Adamski, 2005
- Glyphidocera cenulae Adamski, 2005
- Glyphidocera cerochra Meyrick, 1929
- Glyphidocera cerula Adamski, 2005
- Glyphidocera chungchinmookara Adamski & Brown, 2001
- Glyphidocera citae Adamski, 2005
- Glyphidocera clavae Adamski, 2005
- Glyphidocera comae Adamski, 2005
- Glyphidocera contionis Adamski, 2005
- Glyphidocera coquae Adamski, 2005
- Glyphidocera corniculae Adamski, 2005
- Glyphidocera coronae Adamski, 2005
- Glyphidocera cotis Adamski, 2005
- Glyphidocera coturnicis Adamski, 2005
- Glyphidocera crepidae Adamski, 2005
- Glyphidocera crocogramma Meyrick, 1923
- Glyphidocera cryphiodes (Meyrick, 1918)
- Glyphidocera dentata Adamski & Brown, 2001
- Glyphidocera democratica Meyrick, 1929
- Glyphidocera diciae Adamski, 2005
- Glyphidocera dictionis Adamski, 2005
- Glyphidocera digitella Adamski & Brown, 2001
- Glyphidocera dimorphella Busck, 1907
- Glyphidocera dominicella Walsingham, 1897
- Glyphidocera drosophaea Meyrick, 1929
- Glyphidocera elpista Walsingham, 1911
- Glyphidocera eminetiae Adamski, 2005
- Glyphidocera eurrhipis Meyrick, 1929
- Glyphidocera exsiccata Meyrick, 1914
- Glyphidocera fabulae Adamski, 2005
- Glyphidocera faecis Adamski, 2005
- Glyphidocera ferae Adamski, 2005
- Glyphidocera fidem Adamski, 2005
- Glyphidocera floridanella Busck, 1901
- Glyphidocera formae Adamski, 2005
- Glyphidocera garveyi Adamski & Brown, 2001
- Glyphidocera gazae Adamski, 2005
- Glyphidocera gemmae Adamski, 2005
- Glyphidocera glaebae Adamski, 2005
- Glyphidocera gloriae Adamski, 2005
- Glyphidocera glowackae Adamski & Brown, 2001
- Glyphidocera guaroa Adamski, 2002
- Glyphidocera hamatella Adamski & Brown, 2001
- Glyphidocera harenae Adamski, 2005
- Glyphidocera hurlberti Adamski, 2000
- Glyphidocera illiterata Meyrick, 1929
- Glyphidocera indocilis Meyrick, 1930
- Glyphidocera infulae Adamski, 2005
- Glyphidocera inurbana Meyrick, 1914
- Glyphidocera janae Adamski & Brown, 2001
- Glyphidocera juniperella Adamski, 1987
- Glyphidocera lactiflosella (Chambers, 1878)
- Glyphidocera lanae Adamski, 2005
- Glyphidocera laricae Adamski, 2005
- Glyphidocera lawrenceae Adamski, 2005
- Glyphidocera lepidocyma Meyrick, 1929
- Glyphidocera lithodoxa Meyrick, 1929
- Glyphidocera lophandra Meyrick, 1929
- Glyphidocera lunata Adamski & Brown, 2001
- Glyphidocera lupae Adamski, 2005
- Glyphidocera luxuriae Adamski, 2005
- Glyphidocera melithrepta Meyrick, 1929
- Glyphidocera meyrickella Busck, 1907
- Glyphidocera minarum Adamski, 2005
- Glyphidocera mumiella Adamski & Brown, 2001
- Glyphidocera novercae Adamski, 2005
- Glyphidocera notae Adamski, 2005
- Glyphidocera notolopha Meyrick, 1929
- Glyphidocera nubis Adamski, 2005
- Glyphidocera olivae Adamski, 2005
- Glyphidocera ollae Adamski, 2005
- Glyphidocera operae Adamski, 2005
- Glyphidocera orae Adamski, 2005
- Glyphidocera orthoctenis Meyrick, 1923
- Glyphidocera orthotenes Meyrick, 1929
- Glyphidocera pali Adamski, 2005
- Glyphidocera paenulae Adamski, 2005
- Glyphidocera percnoleuca Meyrick, 1923
- Glyphidocera perobscura Walsingham, 1911
- Glyphidocera personae Adamski, 2005
- Glyphidocera pilae Adamski, 2005
- Glyphidocera placentae Adamski, 2005
- Glyphidocera plebis Adamski, 2005
- Glyphidocera plicata (Walsingham, 1911)
- Glyphidocera plumae Adamski, 2005
- Glyphidocera positurae Adamski, 2005
- Glyphidocera psammolitha Meyrick, 1923
- Glyphidocera ptilostoma Meyrick, 1935
- Glyphidocera ptychocryptis Meyrick, 1929
- Glyphidocera raedae Adamski, 2005
- Glyphidocera ranae Adamski, 2005
- Glyphidocera recticostella Walsingham, 1897
- Glyphidocera reginae Adamski, 2005
- Glyphidocera reparabilis Walsingham, 1911
- Glyphidocera rhypara Walsingham, 1911
- Glyphidocera rodriguezi Adamski, 2005
- Glyphidocera rubetae Adamski, 2005
- Glyphidocera salinae Walsingham, 1911
- Glyphidocera sapphiri Adamski, 2005
- Glyphidocera sardae Adamski, 2005
- Glyphidocera scuticae Adamski, 2005
- Glyphidocera septentrionella Busck, 1904
- Glyphidocera sollertiae Adamski, 2005
- Glyphidocera spathae Adamski, 2005
- Glyphidocera speculae Adamski, 2005
- Glyphidocera staerae Adamski, 2005
- Glyphidocera stenomorpha Meyrick, 1923
- Glyphidocera terrae Adamski, 2005
- Glyphidocera thyrsogastra Meyrick, 1929
- Glyphidocera tibiae Adamski, 2005
- Glyphidocera trachyacma Meyrick, 1931
- Glyphidocera umbrae Adamski, 2005
- Glyphidocera umbrata Walsingham, 1911
- Glyphidocera vappae Adamski, 2005
- Glyphidocera vestita Walsingham, 1911
- Glyphidocera virgulae Adamski, 2005
- Glyphidocera vocis Adamski, 2005
- Glyphidocera wrightorum Adamski & Metzler, 2000
- Glyphidocera zamiae Adamski, 2005
- Glyphidocera zophocrossa Meyrick, 1929
- Glyphidocera zothecuale Adamski, 2005
