= Glyphidocera abiasta =

Scientific classification
- Kingdom: Animalia
- Phylum: Arthropoda
- Class: Insecta
- Order: Lepidoptera
- Family: Autostichidae
- Genus: Glyphidocera
- Species: G. abiasta

Binomial name
- Glyphidocera abiasta Meyrick, 1936

Species of moth

Glyphidocera abiasta is a moth in the family Autostichidae. It was described by Edward Meyrick in 1936. It is found in Venezuela.
