= Glyphidocera psammolitha =

Scientific classification
- Kingdom: Animalia
- Phylum: Arthropoda
- Class: Insecta
- Order: Lepidoptera
- Family: Autostichidae
- Genus: Glyphidocera
- Species: G. psammolitha

Binomial name
- Glyphidocera psammolitha Meyrick, 1923

Species of moth

Glyphidocera psammolitha is a moth in the family Autostichidae. It was described by Edward Meyrick in 1923. It is found in Amazonas, Brazil.

The wingspan is 11–13 mm. The forewings are light greyish ochreous more or less irrorated (sprinkled) with fuscous or dark fuscous. The stigmata form small cloudy fuscous or dark fuscous spots or dots, the plical rather obliquely before the first discal, sometimes an additional spot midway between the first discal and the base. There are sometimes terminal dots of dark fuscous suffusion. The hindwings are ochreous whitish, the apex sometimes greyish tinged.
