= Glyphidocera exsiccata =

Scientific classification
- Kingdom: Animalia
- Phylum: Arthropoda
- Class: Insecta
- Order: Lepidoptera
- Family: Autostichidae
- Genus: Glyphidocera
- Species: G. exsiccata

Binomial name
- Glyphidocera exsiccata Meyrick, 1914

Species of moth

Glyphidocera exsiccata is a moth in the family Autostichidae. It was described by Edward Meyrick in 1914. It is found in Guyana.

The wingspan is 9–12 mm. The forewings are light brownish ochreous, sprinkled with dark fuscous and with a dark fuscous dot in the disc at one-fourth. The stigmata are cloudy, dark fuscous, the plical obliquely before the first discal, an additional dot beneath the second discal. There are some cloudy dark fuscous dots on the termen. The hindwings are grey or whitish grey.
