= Glyphidocera ptilostoma =

Scientific classification
- Kingdom: Animalia
- Phylum: Arthropoda
- Class: Insecta
- Order: Lepidoptera
- Family: Autostichidae
- Genus: Glyphidocera
- Species: G. ptilostoma

Binomial name
- Glyphidocera ptilostoma Meyrick, 1935

Species of moth

Glyphidocera ptilostoma is a moth in the family Autostichidae. It was described by Edward Meyrick in 1935. It is found in Argentina.
