= Glyphidocera salinae =

Scientific classification
- Domain: Eukaryota
- Kingdom: Animalia
- Phylum: Arthropoda
- Class: Insecta
- Order: Lepidoptera
- Family: Autostichidae
- Genus: Glyphidocera
- Species: G. salinae

Binomial name
- Glyphidocera salinae Walsingham, 1911

Species of moth

Glyphidocera salinae is a moth in the family Autostichidae. It was described by Thomas de Grey, 6th Baron Walsingham, in 1911. It is found in Mexico (Oaxaca).

The wingspan is about 20 mm. The forewings are uniform fawn-brownish, without spots, but with a very slight shade at the end of the cell. The hindwings are pale fawn-brownish.
