= Glyphidocera vestita =

Scientific classification
- Domain: Eukaryota
- Kingdom: Animalia
- Phylum: Arthropoda
- Class: Insecta
- Order: Lepidoptera
- Family: Autostichidae
- Genus: Glyphidocera
- Species: G. vestita

Binomial name
- Glyphidocera vestita Walsingham, 1911

Species of insect

Glyphidocera vestita is a moth in the family Autostichidae. It was described by Thomas de Grey, 6th Baron Walsingham, in 1911. It is found in Panama.

The wingspan is 10–12 mm. The forewings are pale fawn, profusely sprinkled throughout with a darker or more fuscous shade of the same. Three darker spots are faintly indicated, one on the cell at one-fifth from the base, another before the middle, reaching from the cell to the fold, and a third at the end of the cell. The hindwings are brownish grey, rather coarsely scaled in males.
