= Glyphidocera zophocrossa =

Scientific classification
- Kingdom: Animalia
- Phylum: Arthropoda
- Class: Insecta
- Order: Lepidoptera
- Family: Autostichidae
- Genus: Glyphidocera
- Species: G. zophocrossa

Binomial name
- Glyphidocera zophocrossa Meyrick, 1929

Species of moth

Glyphidocera zophocrossa is a moth in the family Autostichidae. It was described by Edward Meyrick in 1929. It is found in Trinidad and Costa Rica.

The wingspan is 13–14 mm.
