= Glyphidocera drosophaea =

Scientific classification
- Kingdom: Animalia
- Phylum: Arthropoda
- Class: Insecta
- Order: Lepidoptera
- Family: Autostichidae
- Genus: Glyphidocera
- Species: G. drosophaea

Binomial name
- Glyphidocera drosophaea Meyrick, 1929

Species of moth

Glyphidocera drosophaea is a moth in the family Autostichidae. It was described by Edward Meyrick in 1929. It is found in Colombia.
