= Asaphocrita irenica =

Scientific classification
- Domain: Eukaryota
- Kingdom: Animalia
- Phylum: Arthropoda
- Class: Insecta
- Order: Lepidoptera
- Family: Blastobasidae
- Genus: Asaphocrita
- Species: A. irenica

Binomial name
- Asaphocrita irenica (Walsingham, 1907)

Synonyms
- Catacrypsis irenica Walsingham, 1907

Species of moth

Asaphocrita irenica is a moth in the family Blastobasidae. It is found in North America, from California to British Columbia.

The wingspan is about 20 mm. The forewings are grayish white with brown-gray sprinkling. The hindwings are shining yellowish gray.
