= Asaphocrita sciaphilella =

Scientific classification
- Kingdom: Animalia
- Phylum: Arthropoda
- Clade: Pancrustacea
- Class: Insecta
- Order: Lepidoptera
- Family: Blastobasidae
- Genus: Asaphocrita
- Species: A. sciaphilella

Binomial name
- Asaphocrita sciaphilella (Zeller, 1873)

Synonyms
- Blastobasis sciaphilella Zeller, 1873; Catacrypsis stygna Walsingham, 1907; Holcocera triangularisella Chambers, 1875

Species of moth

Asaphocrita sciaphilella is a moth in the family Blastobasidae. It is found in the United States, including Kentucky, Texas and California.

The wingspan is about 18 mm. The forewings are tawny vinous gray with a purplish sheen. The hindwings are brownish gray.
