= Glyphidocera dominicella =

Scientific classification
- Domain: Eukaryota
- Kingdom: Animalia
- Phylum: Arthropoda
- Class: Insecta
- Order: Lepidoptera
- Family: Autostichidae
- Genus: Glyphidocera
- Species: G. dominicella

Binomial name
- Glyphidocera dominicella Walsingham, 1897

Species of moth

Glyphidocera dominicella is a moth in the family Autostichidae. It was described by Thomas de Grey, 6th Baron Walsingham, in 1897. It is found in the West Indies, where it has been recorded from Dominica.

The wingspan is about 15 mm. The forewings are fawn-grey, sparsely sprinkled with olive-brown and with two olive-brown spots on the disc, one at its outer extremity, the other halfway between this and the base. The hindwings are brownish olivaceous.
