= David Adamski =

American entomologist

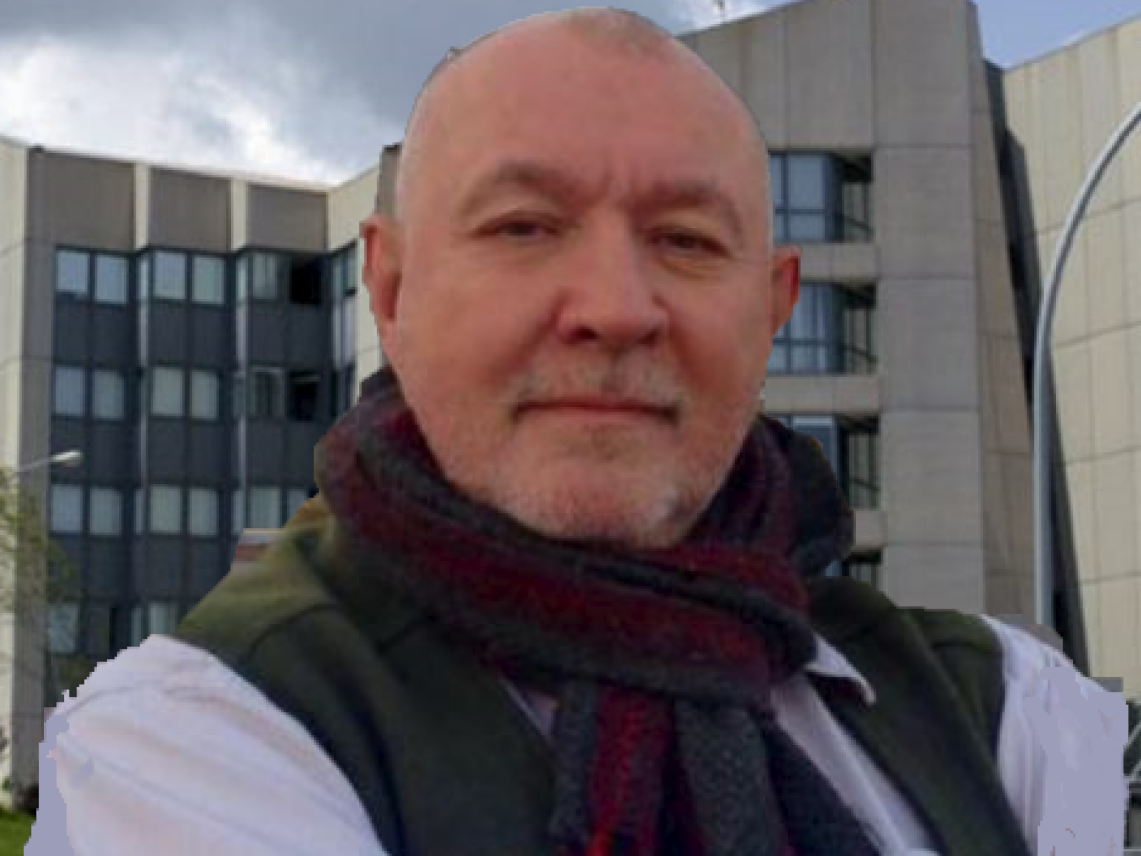
- Born: March 2, 1950
- Died: October 25, 2025 (aged 75); Laurel, Maryland
- Scientific career
- Fields: Entomology

David Adamski (March 2, 1950 - October 25, 2025) was an American entomologist working as a research associate at the Smithsonian Institution's National Museum of Natural History and a support scientist in the Systematic Entomology Laboratory (SEL), United States Department of Agriculture in Washington, D.C. He obtained a PhD degree from the Mississippi State University, Department of Entomology in 1987 after defending a dissertation, titled "The Morphology and evolution of North American Blastobasidae (Lepidoptera:Gelechioidea)". His research interests focused on alpha taxonomy, life histories and morphology of moths. Over the years, Adamski produced more than 80 scholarly publications, some in collaboration, shedding light on discernible groups of Lepidoptera including Gelechioidea, Tortricoidea, Pyralidoidea, and Noctuoidea. He studied divergent taxa within the Auchenorrhyncha and Sternorrhyncha, and Phytophagous Acari, as well as Gelechioidea and Blastobasidae. Adamski was a member of the Entomological Society of Washington.

== Selected publications ==
- Adamski, David (2004), Holcocerini of Costa Rica (Lepidoptera: Gelechioidea: Coleophoridae: Blastobasinae), Entomological Society of Washington
- Adamski, David (2002), A synopsis of described neotropical Blastobasinae (Lepidoptera: Gelechioidea: Coleophoridae), Entomological Society of America, ISBN 978-0-938522-96-6
