= Edax =

Edax or EDAX may refer to:

== Species ==
- Alopecosa edax, a species of wolf spider
- Andean mouse (Andinomys edax)
- Copelatus edax, a species of diving beetle
- Greedy olalla rat (Olallamys edax)
- Hypatopa edax, a species of moth in the family Blastobasidae
- Ithome edax, a species of moth in the family Cosmopterigidae
- Nabis edax, a species of damsel bug

== Other uses ==
- Energy-dispersive analysis X-ray, an alternative name for Energy-dispersive X-ray spectroscopy
- Edax (computing), a computer Othello program
- Charles Lamb (1775–1834)
- Rechlin-Lärz Airfield (ICAO code EDAX), in Germany
