= H. juno =

H. juno may refer to:

- Hemileuca juno, insect in the family Saturniidae
- Hexoplon juno, species of beetle in the family Cerambycidae
- Harpendyreus juno, butterfly in the family Lycaenidae
- Hypatopa juno, moth in the family Blastobasidae
