= Gena (disambiguation) =

Gena may refer to:

- Mareka Gena, one of the 77 woredas in the Southern Nations, Nationalities, and Peoples' Region of Ethiopia.
- gena, a traditional Ethiopian form of field hockey
- Gena or Lidet, the Amharic name for Christmas

== People ==
- Gena Branscombe (1881–1977), Canadian pianist, composer, music educator and choir conductor
- Gena Desouza (born 1997), Thai singer and actress
- Gena Löfstrand (born 1995), South African middle-distance runner
- Gena Lee Nolin (born 1971), American actress and model
- Gena Ozols, American politician
- Gena Rowlands (1930–2024), American film, stage and television actress
- Gena Showalter (born 1975), American author
- Gena Turgel (1923–2018), Polish author, educator and Holocaust survivor
- Siraj Gena, Ethiopian marathon runner

== Places ==
- Alem Gena, a town in central Ethiopia

== Arts and entertainment ==
- Gena the Crocodile, a fictional crocodile in the series of Russian animation films
- Gena the Crocodile (film), Russian film

== Science ==
- gena, the area below the compound eyes or the insect equivalent to human cheeks
- Hypatopa gena, a moth in the family Blastobasidae
- Gena (crater), a tiny lunar craterlet located in the northwest part of the Mare Imbrium in the northwest of the lunar near side.

== See also ==
- Gina (disambiguation)
- Genas, a commune in the Rhône department in eastern France
