= Hypatopa fio =

Scientific classification
- Kingdom: Animalia
- Phylum: Arthropoda
- Clade: Pancrustacea
- Class: Insecta
- Order: Lepidoptera
- Family: Blastobasidae
- Genus: Hypatopa
- Species: H. fio

Binomial name
- Hypatopa fio Adamski, 2013

Species of moth

Hypatopa fio is a moth in the family Blastobasidae. It is found in Costa Rica, especially in western Cordillera de Guanacaste.

== Description ==
The species is noted to be similar to H. erato in regards to its facial features, but it differs in that it has a longer uncus and other similar differences.

The length of the fore wings is about 4.7 mm.
