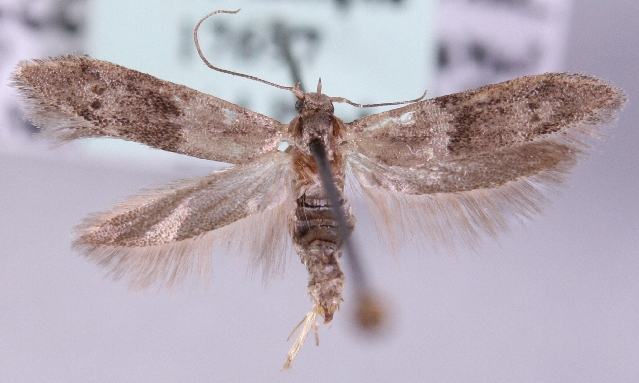
- Hypatopa segnella.

Scientific classification
- Domain: Eukaryota
- Kingdom: Animalia
- Phylum: Arthropoda
- Class: Insecta
- Order: Lepidoptera
- Family: Blastobasidae
- Subfamily: Holcocerinae
- Genus: Hypatopa; Walsingham, 1907

Synonyms
- Blastobasoides McDunnough, 1961

= Hypatopa =

Moth genus in family Blastobasidae

Hypatopa is a genus of moths in the family Blastobasidae.

== Species ==
- Hypatopa actes
- Hypatopa acus
- Hypatopa agnae
- Hypatopa annulipes
- Hypatopa arxcis
- Hypatopa bilobata
- Hypatopa binotella
- Hypatopa boreasella
- Hypatopa brevipalpella (Walsingham, 1897)
- Hypatopa caedis
- Hypatopa caepae
- Hypatopa cladis
- Hypatopa cotis
- Hypatopa cotytto
- Hypatopa crescentella
- Hypatopa crux
- Hypatopa cryptopalpella Adamski, 1999
- Hypatopa cyane
- Hypatopa dicax
- Hypatopa dolo
- Hypatopa dux
- Hypatopa edax
- Hypatopa eos
- Hypatopa erato
- Hypatopa fio
- Hypatopa fluxella
- Hypatopa funebra
- Hypatopa gena
- Hypatopa hecate
- Hypatopa hera
- Hypatopa hora
- Hypatopa hulstella
- Hypatopa ibericella
- Hypatopa illibella
- Hypatopa inconspicua
- Hypatopa insulatella
- Hypatopa interpunctella
- Hypatopa inunctella
- Hypatopa io
- Hypatopa ira
- Hypatopa joniella
- Hypatopa juno
- Hypatopa leda Adamski, 2013
- Hypatopa limae
- Hypatopa lucina
- Hypatopa manus
- Hypatopa messelinella
- Hypatopa montivaga (Inoue et al., 1982)
- Hypatopa mora
- Hypatopa moriutiella Sinev, 1986
- Hypatopa morrisoni
- Hypatopa musa
- Hypatopa nex
- Hypatopa nigrostriata
- Hypatopa nox
- Hypatopa nucella
- Hypatopa phoebe
- Hypatopa pica
- Hypatopa plebis
- Hypatopa punctiferella
- Hypatopa rabio
- Hypatopa rea
- Hypatopa rego
- Hypatopa rudis
- Hypatopa sagitella
- Hypatopa sais
- Hypatopa scobis
- Hypatopa segnella
- Hypatopa semela
- Hypatopa silvestrella Kuznetzov, 1984
- Hypatopa simplicella
- Hypatopa solea
- Hypatopa spoliatella (Dietz, 1910)
- Hypatopa spretella
- Hypatopa styga
- Hypatopa tapadulcea
- Hypatopa texanella
- Hypatopa texla
- Hypatopa texo
- Hypatopa tianschanica Sinev, 1993
- Hypatopa titanella
- Hypatopa umbra
- Hypatopa ursella
- Hypatopa verax
- Hypatopa vestaliella
- Hypatopa vitis
- Hypatopa vox
