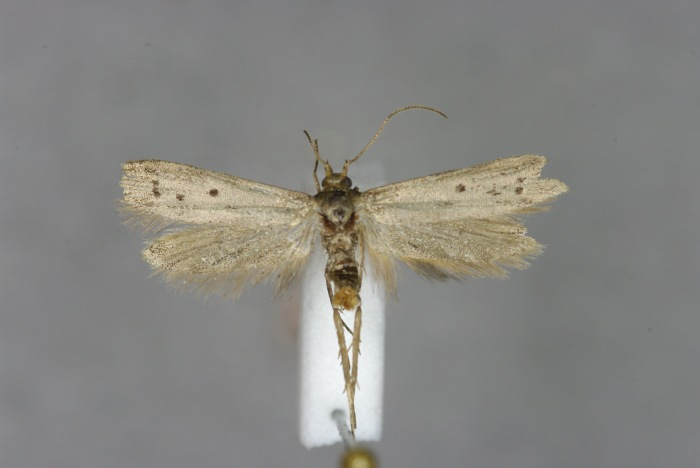
- Specimen from Salzburg, Austria

Scientific classification
- Kingdom: Animalia
- Phylum: Arthropoda
- Clade: Pancrustacea
- Class: Insecta
- Order: Lepidoptera
- Family: Blastobasidae
- Genus: Hypatopa
- Species: H. binotella

Binomial name
- Hypatopa binotella (Thunberg, 1794)

Synonyms
- Tinea binotella Thunberg, 1794

= Hypatopa binotella =

Species of moth

Hypatopa binotella, the spotted dowd moth, is a moth in the family Blastobasidae. It is found in most of mainland Europe, except the Iberian Peninsula and most of the Balkan Peninsula. It was first recorded from Great Britain in 2006 where it is probably accidentally imported.

The wingspan is 19–21 mm. Adults are on wing from late May to mid-August in one generation per year.

The larvae feed on the fallen needles of various pines trees (Pinus species).
