= Pigritia haha =

Scientific classification
- Kingdom: Animalia
- Phylum: Arthropoda
- Clade: Pancrustacea
- Class: Insecta
- Order: Lepidoptera
- Family: Blastobasidae
- Genus: Pigritia
- Species: P. haha

Binomial name
- Pigritia haha Adamski, 2013

Species of moth

Pigritia haha is a moth in the family Blastobasidae. It is found in Costa Rica.

The length of the forewings is 3.9–4.9 mm.
