= Hexoplon lucidum =

Scientific classification
- Domain: Eukaryota
- Kingdom: Animalia
- Phylum: Arthropoda
- Class: Insecta
- Order: Coleoptera
- Suborder: Polyphaga
- Infraorder: Cucujiformia
- Family: Cerambycidae
- Genus: Hexoplon
- Species: H. lucidum

Binomial name
- Hexoplon lucidum Martins, 1962

Species of beetle

Hexoplon lucidum is a species of beetle in the family Cerambycidae. It was described by Martins in 1962.
