= Hypatopa inconspicua =

Scientific classification
- Kingdom: Animalia
- Phylum: Arthropoda
- Clade: Pancrustacea
- Class: Insecta
- Order: Lepidoptera
- Family: Blastobasidae
- Genus: Hypatopa
- Species: H. inconspicua

Binomial name
- Hypatopa inconspicua (Walsingham, 1907)

Synonyms
- Catacrypsis inconspicua Walsingham, 1907

Species of moth

Hypatopa inconspicua is a moth in the family Blastobasidae. It is found in the United States, including California.
