= Hypatopa nucella =

Scientific classification
- Domain: Eukaryota
- Kingdom: Animalia
- Phylum: Arthropoda
- Class: Insecta
- Order: Lepidoptera
- Family: Blastobasidae
- Genus: Hypatopa
- Species: H. nucella

Binomial name
- Hypatopa nucella (Walsingham, 1907)

Synonyms
- Catacrypsis nucella Walsingham, 1907

Species of moth

Hypatopa nucella is a moth in the family Blastobasidae. It is found in the United States, including Colorado and Maine.

The wingspan is 16–18 mm.
