= Hypatopa crux =

Scientific classification
- Kingdom: Animalia
- Phylum: Arthropoda
- Clade: Pancrustacea
- Class: Insecta
- Order: Lepidoptera
- Family: Blastobasidae
- Genus: Hypatopa
- Species: H. crux

Binomial name
- Hypatopa crux Adamski, 2013

Species of moth

Hypatopa crux is a moth in the family Blastobasidae. It is found in Costa Rica.

The length of the forewings is 3.9–5.1 mm.

== Etymology ==
The specific name is derived from Latin crux (meaning a cross).
