= Hypatopa funebra =

Scientific classification
- Domain: Eukaryota
- Kingdom: Animalia
- Phylum: Arthropoda
- Class: Insecta
- Order: Lepidoptera
- Family: Blastobasidae
- Genus: Hypatopa
- Species: H. funebra

Binomial name
- Hypatopa funebra (Dietz, 1910)

Synonyms
- Holcocera funebra Dietz, 1910

Species of moth

Hypatopa funebra is a moth in the family Blastobasidae. It is found in North America, including Pennsylvania, Maryland, Maine and Florida.
