= Hypatopa joniella =

Scientific classification
- Kingdom: Animalia
- Phylum: Arthropoda
- Clade: Pancrustacea
- Class: Insecta
- Order: Lepidoptera
- Family: Blastobasidae
- Genus: Hypatopa
- Species: H. joniella

Binomial name
- Hypatopa joniella Adamski, 2013

Species of moth

Hypatopa joniella is a moth in the family Blastobasidae. It is found in Costa Rica.

The length of the forewings is 9.5–10.2 mm.

== Etymology ==
The specific is named in honor of Jon David Adamski, who collected the species together with the author who first described the species.
