= Hypatopa ira =

Scientific classification
- Kingdom: Animalia
- Phylum: Arthropoda
- Clade: Pancrustacea
- Class: Insecta
- Order: Lepidoptera
- Family: Blastobasidae
- Genus: Hypatopa
- Species: H. ira

Binomial name
- Hypatopa ira Adamski, 2013

Species of moth

Hypatopa ira is a moth in the family Blastobasidae. It is found in Costa Rica.

The length of the forewings is 4.1–4.7 mm (0.16–0.19 in). The forewings are pale brown intermixed with brown scales. The hindwings are translucent pale brown.

== Etymology ==
The specific name is derived from Latin ira (meaning wrath or anger).
