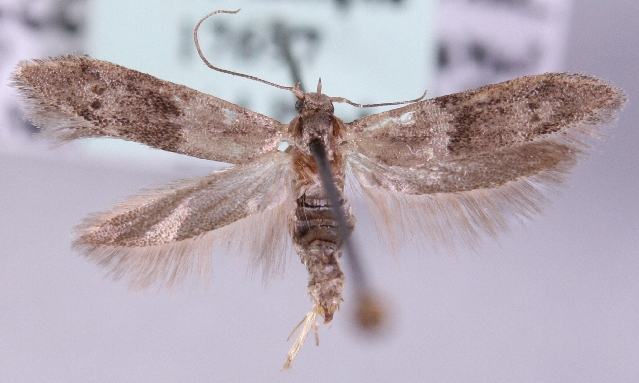

Scientific classification
- Kingdom: Animalia
- Phylum: Arthropoda
- Clade: Pancrustacea
- Class: Insecta
- Order: Lepidoptera
- Family: Blastobasidae
- Genus: Hypatopa
- Species: H. segnella

Binomial name
- Hypatopa segnella (Zeller, 1873)

Synonyms
- Blastobasis segnella Zeller, 1873; Blastobasis perfugella Jonasson, 1985

= Hypatopa segnella =

Species of moth

Hypatopa segnella is a moth in the family Blastobasidae. It is found in Norway, Finland, Germany, Poland, Austria, Slovakia, the Czech Republic, Bosnia and Herzegovina, Ukraine and Russia. It has also been recorded from Switzerland. It has also been recorded from North America, but these records were later treated as misidentifications.

The wingspan is 13–17 mm. Adults are on wing from June to August.
