= Pigritia stips =

Scientific classification
- Kingdom: Animalia
- Phylum: Arthropoda
- Clade: Pancrustacea
- Class: Insecta
- Order: Lepidoptera
- Family: Blastobasidae
- Genus: Pigritia
- Species: P. stips

Binomial name
- Pigritia stips Adamski, 2013

Species of moth

Pigritia stips is a moth in the family Blastobasidae. It is found in Costa Rica.

The length of the forewings is 4.2–4.9 mm. The forewings have brown scales tipped with pale-brown intermixed with pale-brown scales or pale brown intermixed with brownish-orange scales. The hindwings are translucent pale brown, gradually darkening towards the apex.

== Etymology ==
The specific name is derived from Latin stips (meaning a small coin).
