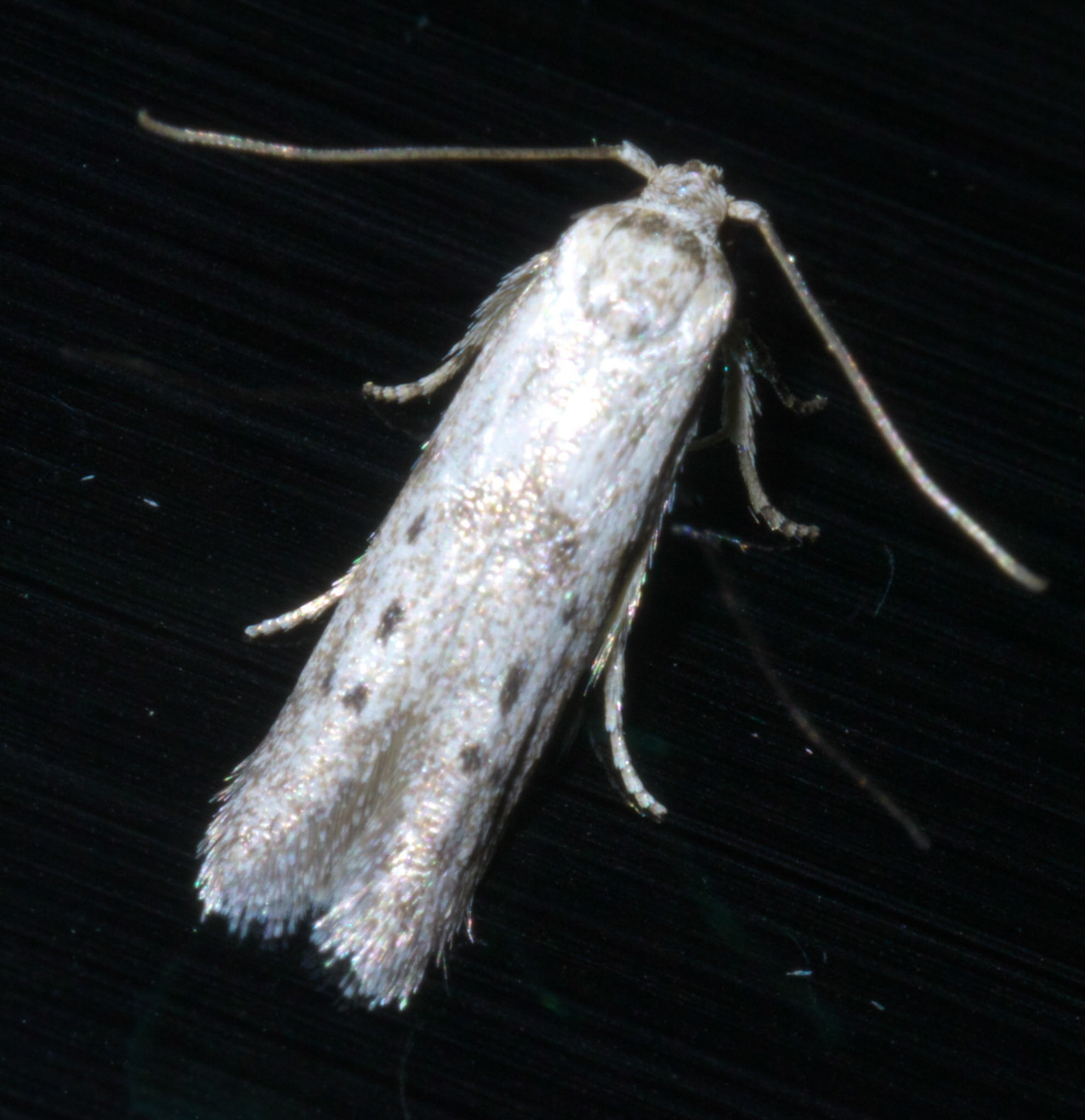
- Hypatopa punctiferella, Oklahoma

Scientific classification
- Kingdom: Animalia
- Phylum: Arthropoda
- Clade: Pancrustacea
- Class: Insecta
- Order: Lepidoptera
- Family: Blastobasidae
- Genus: Hypatopa
- Species: H. punctiferella

Binomial name
- Hypatopa punctiferella (Clemens, 1863)

Synonyms
- Gelechia punctiferella Clemens, 1863; Hypatima var. punctiferella subsenella Zeller, 1873; Holcocera clemensella Chambers, 1874; Holcocera tartarella Dietz, 1910

= Hypatopa punctiferella =

Species of moth

Hypatopa punctiferella is a moth in the family Blastobasidae. It is found in North America.
