= Hypatopa vestaliella =

Scientific classification
- Domain: Eukaryota
- Kingdom: Animalia
- Phylum: Arthropoda
- Class: Insecta
- Order: Lepidoptera
- Family: Blastobasidae
- Genus: Hypatopa
- Species: H. vestaliella

Binomial name
- Hypatopa vestaliella (Dietz, 1910)

Synonyms
- Holcocera vestaliella Dietz, 1910

Species of moth

Hypatopa vestaliella is a moth in the family Blastobasidae. It is found in the United States, including Maryland, Massachusetts, Pennsylvania and Maine.
