= Hypatopa vitis =

Scientific classification
- Kingdom: Animalia
- Phylum: Arthropoda
- Clade: Pancrustacea
- Class: Insecta
- Order: Lepidoptera
- Family: Blastobasidae
- Genus: Hypatopa
- Species: H. vitis

Binomial name
- Hypatopa vitis Adamski, 2013

Species of moth

Hypatopa vitis is a moth in the family Blastobasidae. It is found in Costa Rica.

The length of the forewings is about 6.5 mm.

== Etymology ==
The specific name is derived from Latin vitis (a centurion's staff made of a branch of a vine.)
