= Hypatopa illibella =

Scientific classification
- Kingdom: Animalia
- Phylum: Arthropoda
- Class: Insecta
- Order: Lepidoptera
- Family: Blastobasidae
- Genus: Hypatopa
- Species: H. illibella

Binomial name
- Hypatopa illibella (Dietz, 1910)

Synonyms
- Holcocera illibella Dietz, 1910

Species of moth

Hypatopa illibella is a moth in the family Blastobasidae. It is found in the United States, including Maryland.
