= Hypatopa annulipes =

Scientific classification
- Domain: Eukaryota
- Kingdom: Animalia
- Phylum: Arthropoda
- Class: Insecta
- Order: Lepidoptera
- Family: Blastobasidae
- Genus: Hypatopa
- Species: H. annulipes

Binomial name
- Hypatopa annulipes (Dietz, 1910)

Synonyms
- Holcocera crescentella var. annulipes Dietz, 1910

Species of moth

Hypatopa annulipes is a moth in the family Blastobasidae. It is found in Arizona, United States.
