= Hypatopa umbra =

Scientific classification
- Domain: Eukaryota
- Kingdom: Animalia
- Phylum: Arthropoda
- Class: Insecta
- Order: Lepidoptera
- Family: Blastobasidae
- Genus: Hypatopa
- Species: H. umbra

Binomial name
- Hypatopa umbra Adamski, 2013

Species of moth

Hypatopa umbra is a moth in the family Blastobasidae. It is found in Costa Rica.

The length of the forewings is 3.5–5.1 mm.
