= Hypatopa manus =

Scientific classification
- Kingdom: Animalia
- Phylum: Arthropoda
- Clade: Pancrustacea
- Class: Insecta
- Order: Lepidoptera
- Family: Blastobasidae
- Genus: Hypatopa
- Species: H. manus

Binomial name
- Hypatopa manus Adamski, 2013

Species of moth

Hypatopa manus is a moth in the family Blastobasidae. It is found in Costa Rica.

The length of the forewings is 4–6 mm. The forewings are pale brown intermixed with brown scales. The hindwings are translucent pale brown.

== Etymology ==
The specific name is derived from Latin manus (meaning the hand).
