= Pigritia ululae =

Scientific classification
- Kingdom: Animalia
- Phylum: Arthropoda
- Clade: Pancrustacea
- Class: Insecta
- Order: Lepidoptera
- Family: Blastobasidae
- Genus: Pigritia
- Species: P. ululae

Binomial name
- Pigritia ululae Adamski, 2013

Species of moth

Pigritia ululae is a moth in the family Blastobasidae. It is found in Costa Rica.

The length of the forewings is 4.5–5 mm.

== Etymology ==
The specific name is derived from Latin ulula (meaning an owl).
