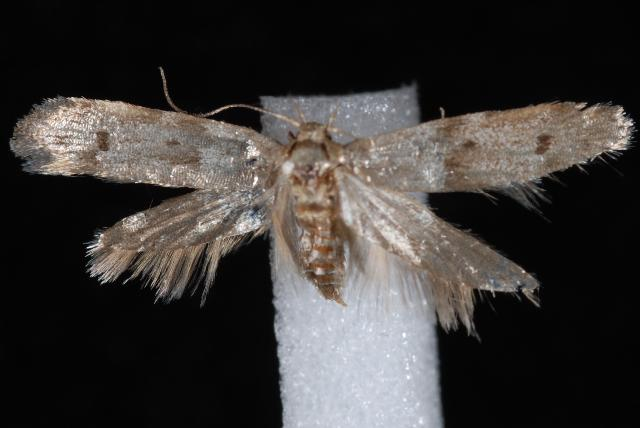

Scientific classification
- Domain: Eukaryota
- Kingdom: Animalia
- Phylum: Arthropoda
- Class: Insecta
- Order: Lepidoptera
- Family: Blastobasidae
- Genus: Hypatopa
- Species: H. simplicella

Binomial name
- Hypatopa simplicella (Dietz, 1910)

Synonyms
- Blastobasis plumerella var. simplicella Dietz, 1910; Blastobasis distinctella Dietz, 1910; Blastobasis coenomorpha Meyrick, 1931; Blastobasoides differtella McDunnough, 1961

= Hypatopa simplicella =

Species of moth

Hypatopa simplicella is a moth in the family Blastobasidae. It is found in North America, including Iowa, Pennsylvania, Ontario, Nova Scotia, British Columbia, Quebec, Maine and Oklahoma.
