= Hexoplon praetermissum =

Scientific classification
- Domain: Eukaryota
- Kingdom: Animalia
- Phylum: Arthropoda
- Class: Insecta
- Order: Coleoptera
- Suborder: Polyphaga
- Infraorder: Cucujiformia
- Family: Cerambycidae
- Genus: Hexoplon
- Species: H. praetermissum

Binomial name
- Hexoplon praetermissum Bates, 1870

Species of beetle

Hexoplon praetermissum is a species of beetle in the family Cerambycidae. It was described by Henry Walter Bates in 1870.
