= Hypatopa tapadulcea =

Scientific classification
- Kingdom: Animalia
- Phylum: Arthropoda
- Clade: Pancrustacea
- Class: Insecta
- Order: Lepidoptera
- Family: Blastobasidae
- Genus: Hypatopa
- Species: H. tapadulcea

Binomial name
- Hypatopa tapadulcea Adamski, 1999

Species of moth

Hypatopa tapadulcea is a moth in the family Blastobasidae. It is found in Costa Rica.

The length of the forewings is about 5 mm. The forewings are brown and the hindwings are grey.
