= Hypatopa texanella =

Scientific classification
- Domain: Eukaryota
- Kingdom: Animalia
- Phylum: Arthropoda
- Class: Insecta
- Order: Lepidoptera
- Family: Blastobasidae
- Genus: Hypatopa
- Species: H. texanella

Binomial name
- Hypatopa texanella Walsingham, 1907

Synonyms
- Holcocera simulella Dietz, 1910

Species of moth

Hypatopa texanella is a moth in the family Blastobasidae. It is found in the United States, including Texas, Arizona and Utah.

The wingspan is 14–16 mm.
