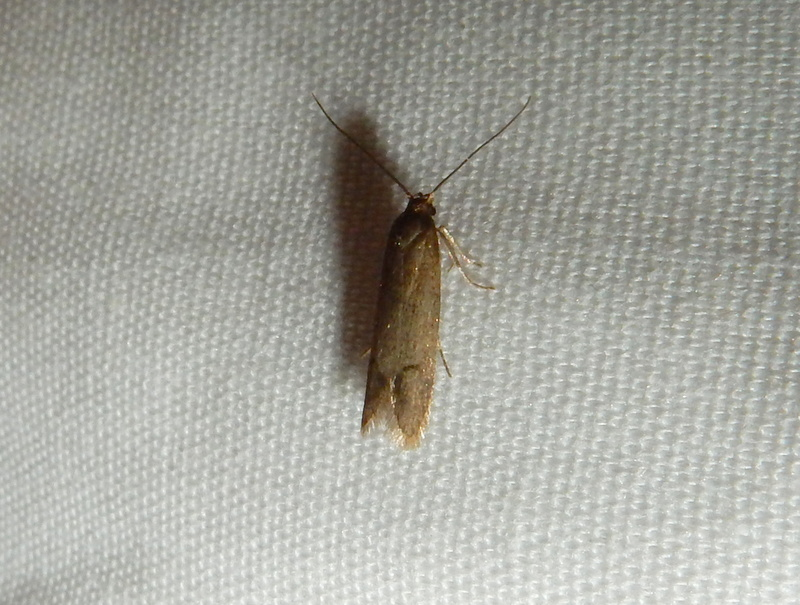

Scientific classification
- Kingdom: Animalia
- Phylum: Arthropoda
- Clade: Pancrustacea
- Class: Insecta
- Order: Lepidoptera
- Family: Blastobasidae
- Genus: Hypatopa
- Species: H. inunctella

Binomial name
- Hypatopa inunctella (Zeller, 1839)

Synonyms
- Oecophora inunctella Zeller, 1839; Hypatima fuscella Klemensiewicz, 1898; Hypatima haliciella Klemensiewicz, 1898

= Hypatopa inunctella =

Species of moth

Hypatopa inunctella is a moth in the family Blastobasidae. It is found in most of Europe (except Iceland, Ireland, Great Britain, Norway, Portugal and most of the Balkan Peninsula).

The wingspan is 14–15 mm. Adults are on wing from July to August in one generation per year.

The larvae feed on plant material.
