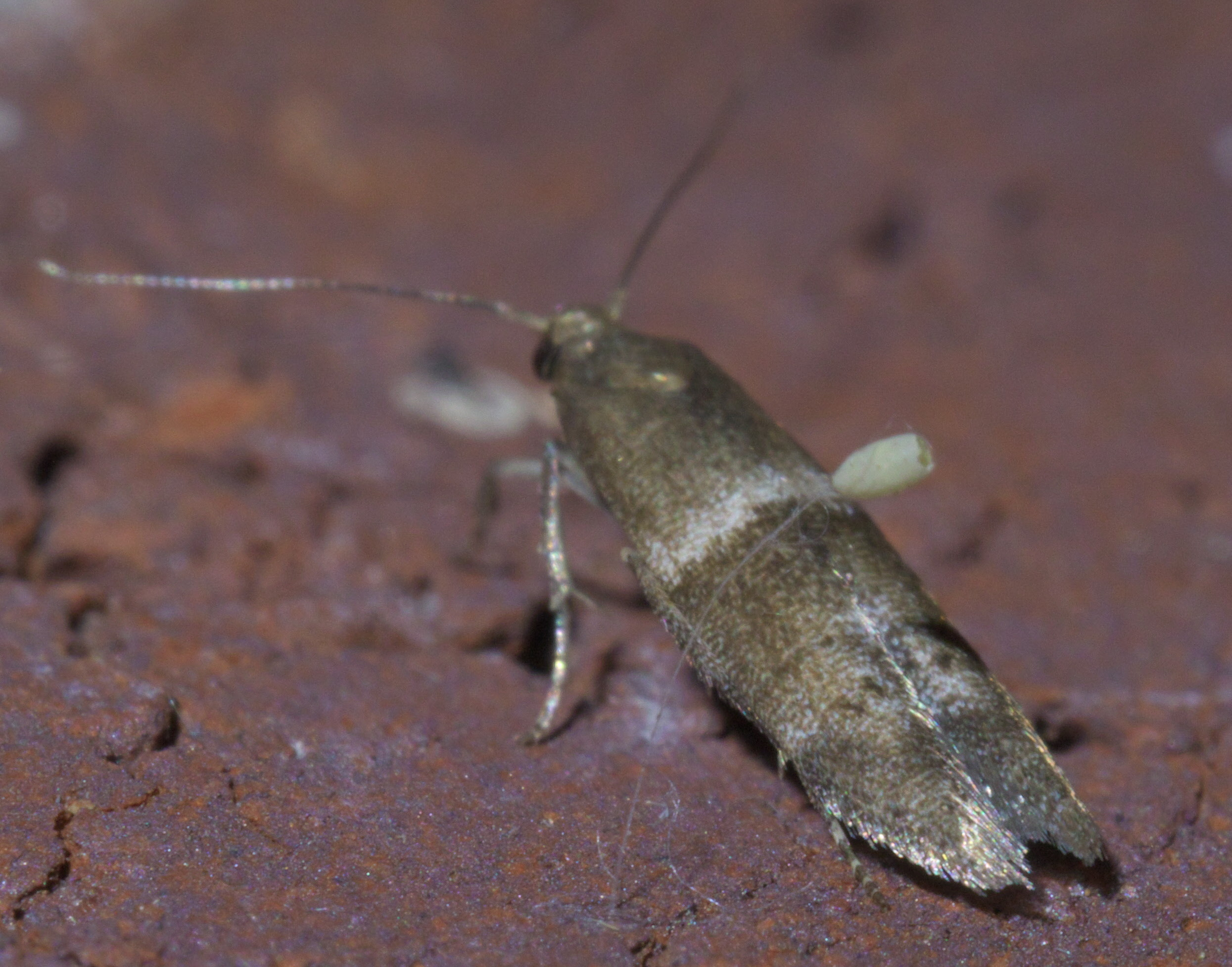

Scientific classification
- Kingdom: Animalia
- Phylum: Arthropoda
- Clade: Pancrustacea
- Class: Insecta
- Order: Lepidoptera
- Family: Blastobasidae
- Subfamily: Blastobasinae
- Tribe: Pigritiini
- Genus: Pigritia; Clemens, 1860

Synonyms
- Americides Kirkaldy, 1910; Dryope V.T. Chambers, 1874 (preocc.); Dryoperia Coolidge, 1909; Epigritia W.G. Dietz, 1900; Ploiophora Dietz, 1900 (also listed as a synonym of Blastobasis); Pseudopigritia Dietz, 1900

= Pigritia =

Moth genus in family Blastobasidae

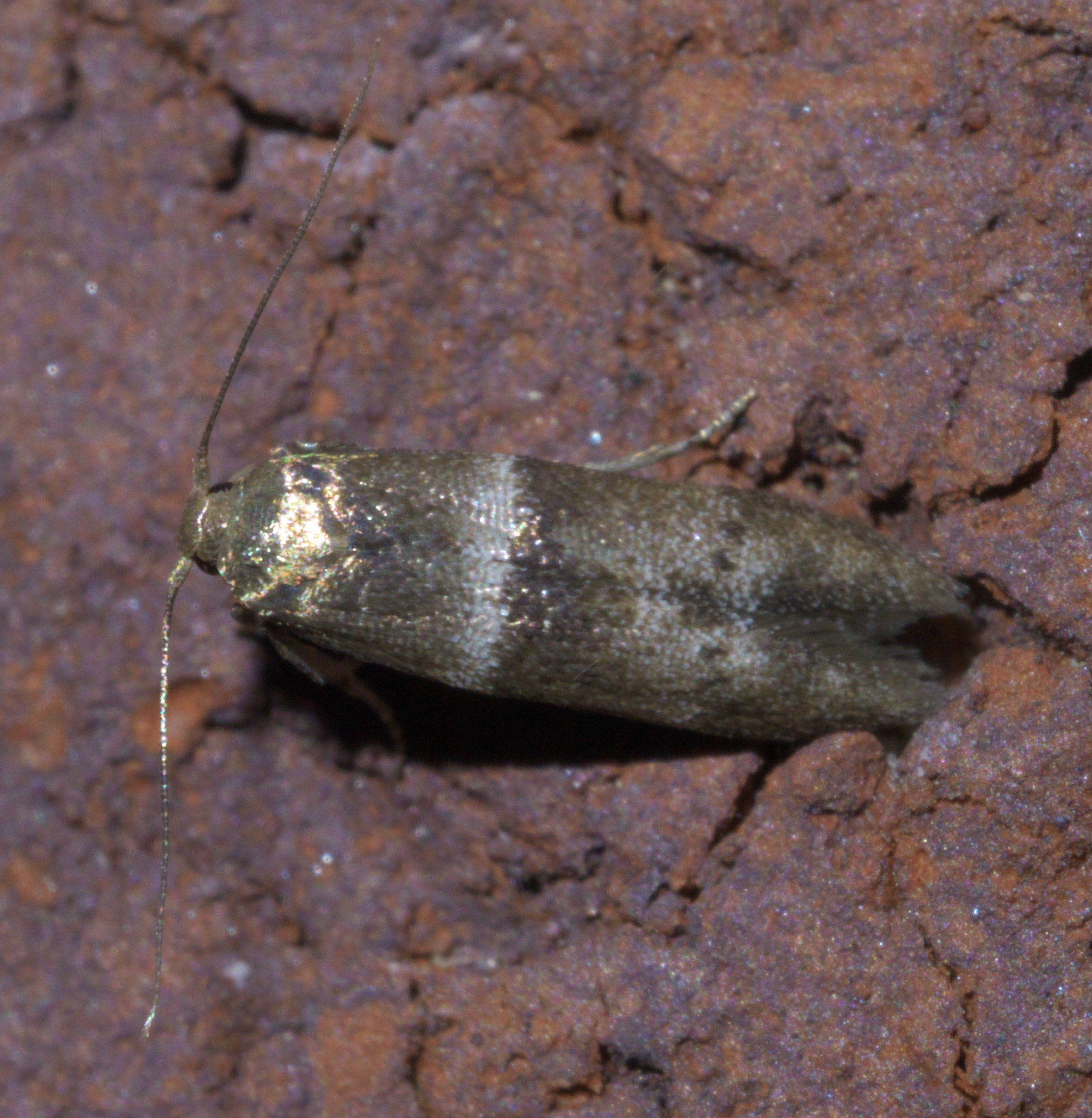
Pigritia, Size: 6.2 mm

Pigritia is a genus of moths in the family Blastobasidae.

== Species ==
- Pigritia arizonella
- Pigritia astuta Meyrick, 1918
- Pigritia biatomella (Walsingham, 1897)
- Pigritia dido
- Pigritia faux
- Pigritia fidella
- Pigritia gruis
- Pigritia haha
- Pigritia laticapitella
- Pigritia marjoriella
- Pigritia medeocris Walsingham, 1897
- Pigritia murtfeldtella
- Pigritia ochrocomella
- Pigritia sedis
- Pigritia stips
- Pigritia troctis Meyrick, 1922
- Pigritia ululae
- Pigritia uuku
