= Pigritia troctis =

Scientific classification
- Kingdom: Animalia
- Phylum: Arthropoda
- Class: Insecta
- Order: Lepidoptera
- Family: Blastobasidae
- Genus: Pigritia
- Species: P. troctis

Binomial name
- Pigritia troctis Meyrick, 1922

Species of moth

Pigritia troctis is a moth in the family Blastobasidae. It was described by Edward Meyrick in 1922. It is found on Barbados.
