= Hypatopa rego =

Scientific classification
- Kingdom: Animalia
- Phylum: Arthropoda
- Clade: Pancrustacea
- Class: Insecta
- Order: Lepidoptera
- Family: Blastobasidae
- Genus: Hypatopa
- Species: H. rego

Binomial name
- Hypatopa rego Adamski, 2013

Species of moth

Hypatopa rego is a moth in the family Blastobasidae. It is found in Costa Rica.

The length of the forewings is 4.2–5.3 mm.

== Etymology ==
The specific name is derived from Latin regula (meaning a straight length or ruler).
