= Hypatopa nigrostriata =

Scientific classification
- Domain: Eukaryota
- Kingdom: Animalia
- Phylum: Arthropoda
- Class: Insecta
- Order: Lepidoptera
- Family: Blastobasidae
- Genus: Hypatopa
- Species: H. nigrostriata

Binomial name
- Hypatopa nigrostriata (Walsingham, 1907)

Synonyms
- Holcocera nigrostriata Walsingham, 1907; Hypatopa nigristriata

Species of moth

Hypatopa nigrostriata is a moth in the family Blastobasidae. It is found in the United States, including Arizona and California.

The wingspan is about 13 mm.
