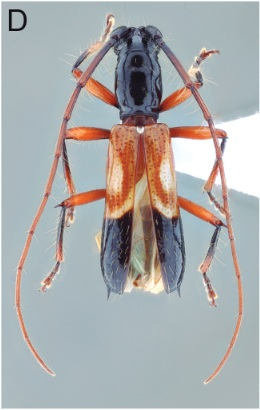

Scientific classification
- Kingdom: Animalia
- Phylum: Arthropoda
- Clade: Pancrustacea
- Class: Insecta
- Order: Coleoptera
- Suborder: Polyphaga
- Infraorder: Cucujiformia
- Family: Cerambycidae
- Genus: Hexoplon
- Species: H. reinhardti

Binomial name
- Hexoplon reinhardti Aurivillius, 1899

= Hexoplon reinhardti =

Species of beetle

Hexoplon reinhardti is a species of beetle in the family Cerambycidae. It was described by Per Olof Christopher Aurivillius in 1899. It is found in Peru and Brazil.
