= Hypatopa limae =

Scientific classification
- Kingdom: Animalia
- Phylum: Arthropoda
- Clade: Pancrustacea
- Class: Insecta
- Order: Lepidoptera
- Family: Blastobasidae
- Genus: Hypatopa
- Species: H. limae

Binomial name
- Hypatopa limae Adamski, 2013

Species of moth

Hypatopa limae is a moth in the family Blastobasidae. It is found in Costa Rica.

The length of the forewings is about 10.5 mm. The forewings are pale reddish brown. The hindwings are translucent pale brown.

== Etymology ==
The specific name is derived from Latin limae (meaning labor).
