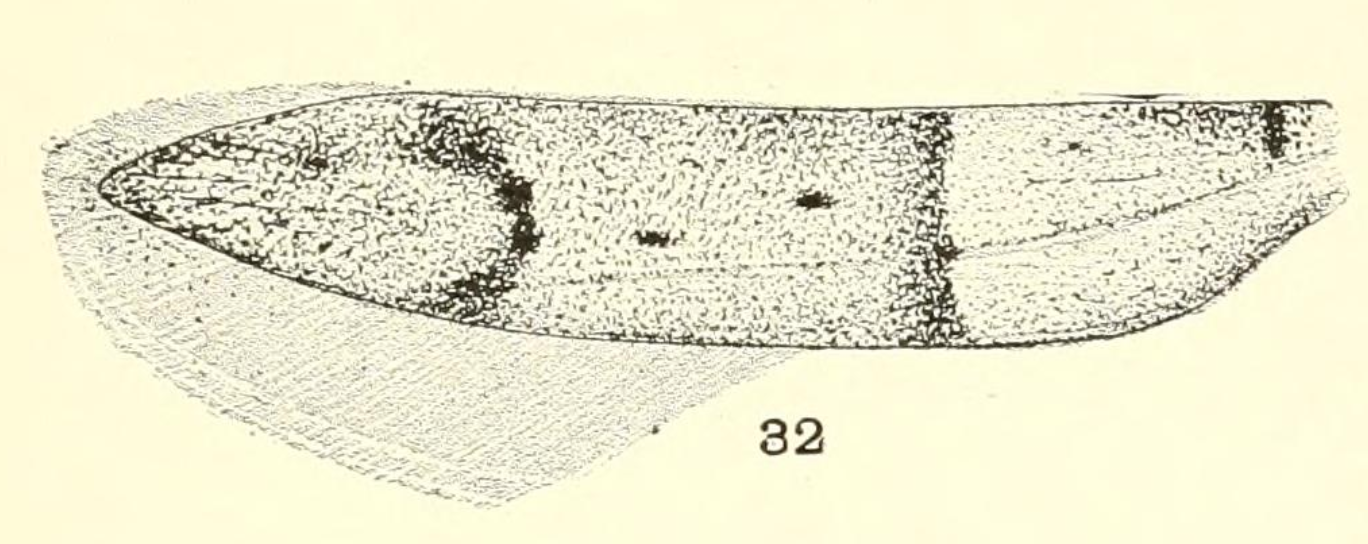
- forewing

Scientific classification
- Domain: Eukaryota
- Kingdom: Animalia
- Phylum: Arthropoda
- Class: Insecta
- Order: Lepidoptera
- Family: Blastobasidae
- Genus: Hypatopa
- Species: H. spretella

Binomial name
- Hypatopa spretella (Dietz, 1910)

Synonyms
- Holcocera spretella Dietz, 1910

= Hypatopa spretella =

Species of moth

Hypatopa spretella is a moth in the family Blastobasidae. It is found in the United States, including Arizona and Florida.
