= Hypatopa crescentella =

Scientific classification
- Domain: Eukaryota
- Kingdom: Animalia
- Phylum: Arthropoda
- Class: Insecta
- Order: Lepidoptera
- Family: Blastobasidae
- Genus: Hypatopa
- Species: H. crescentella

Binomial name
- Hypatopa crescentella (Dietz, 1910)

Synonyms
- Holcocera crescentella Dietz, 1910

Species of moth

Hypatopa crescentella is a moth in the family Blastobasidae. It is found in North America, including Utah.
