= Hypatopa fluxella =

Scientific classification
- Kingdom: Animalia
- Phylum: Arthropoda
- Clade: Pancrustacea
- Class: Insecta
- Order: Lepidoptera
- Family: Blastobasidae
- Genus: Hypatopa
- Species: H. fluxella

Binomial name
- Hypatopa fluxella (Zeller, 1873)

Synonyms
- Blastobasis fluxella Zeller, 1873; Catacrypsis fluxella; Holcocera zelleriella Dietz, 1910; Holcocera zelleriella var. annectella Dietz, 1910; Holcocera pusilla Dietz, 1910

Species of moth

Hypatopa fluxella is a moth in the family Blastobasidae. It is found in the United States, including Texas, Louisiana and Maine.
