= Hexoplon scutellare =

Scientific classification
- Domain: Eukaryota
- Kingdom: Animalia
- Phylum: Arthropoda
- Class: Insecta
- Order: Coleoptera
- Suborder: Polyphaga
- Infraorder: Cucujiformia
- Family: Cerambycidae
- Genus: Hexoplon
- Species: H. scutellare

Binomial name
- Hexoplon scutellare Napp & Martins, 1985

Species of beetle

Hexoplon scutellare is a species of beetle in the family Cerambycidae. It was described by Napp and Martins in 1985.
