= Pigritia marjoriella =

Scientific classification
- Kingdom: Animalia
- Phylum: Arthropoda
- Clade: Pancrustacea
- Class: Insecta
- Order: Lepidoptera
- Family: Blastobasidae
- Genus: Pigritia
- Species: P. marjoriella

Binomial name
- Pigritia marjoriella Adamski, 1998

Species of moth

Pigritia marjoriella is a moth in the family Blastobasidae. It is found in Costa Rica.

The length of the forewings is 3.8–6 mm.
