= Hypatopa plebis =

Scientific classification
- Kingdom: Animalia
- Phylum: Arthropoda
- Clade: Pancrustacea
- Class: Insecta
- Order: Lepidoptera
- Family: Blastobasidae
- Genus: Hypatopa
- Species: H. plebis

Binomial name
- Hypatopa plebis Adamski, 2013

Species of moth

Hypatopa plebis is a moth in the family Blastobasidae. It is found in Costa Rica.

The length of the forewings is 4.1–5.5 mm. The forewings are brownish grey intermixed with pale brownish-grey scales scattered throughout the middle area from the base to the crossvein of the cell. The hindwings are translucent pale brown.

== Etymology ==
The specific name is derived from Latin plebs (meaning the people).
