= Hypatopa hera =

Scientific classification
- Kingdom: Animalia
- Phylum: Arthropoda
- Clade: Pancrustacea
- Class: Insecta
- Order: Lepidoptera
- Family: Blastobasidae
- Genus: Hypatopa
- Species: H. hera

Binomial name
- Hypatopa hera Adamski, 2013

Species of moth

Hypatopa hera is a moth in the family Blastobasidae. It is found in Costa Rica.

The length of the forewings is about 5.5 mm. The forewings are pale brown and the hindwings are translucent pale brown

== Etymology ==
The specific name refers to the Greek goddess Hera.
