= Hypatopa cotis =

Scientific classification
- Kingdom: Animalia
- Phylum: Arthropoda
- Clade: Pancrustacea
- Class: Insecta
- Order: Lepidoptera
- Family: Blastobasidae
- Genus: Hypatopa
- Species: H. cotis

Binomial name
- Hypatopa cotis Adamski, 2013

Species of moth

Hypatopa cotis is a moth in the family Blastobasidae. It is found in Costa Rica.

The length of the forewings is about 4.5 mm.

== Etymology ==
The specific name is derived from Latin cos (meaning a hard flint stone).
