= Hexoplon immaculatum =

Scientific classification
- Domain: Eukaryota
- Kingdom: Animalia
- Phylum: Arthropoda
- Class: Insecta
- Order: Coleoptera
- Suborder: Polyphaga
- Infraorder: Cucujiformia
- Family: Cerambycidae
- Genus: Hexoplon
- Species: H. immaculatum

Binomial name
- Hexoplon immaculatum Galileo & Martins, 2009

Species of beetle

Hexoplon immaculatum is a species of beetle in the family Cerambycidae. It was described by Galileo and Martins in 2009.
