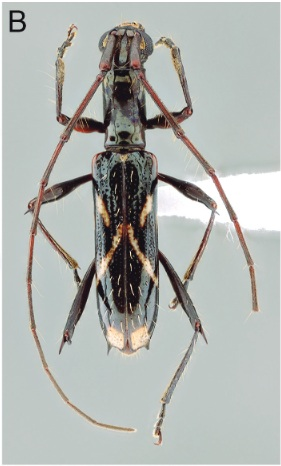

Scientific classification
- Kingdom: Animalia
- Phylum: Arthropoda
- Clade: Pancrustacea
- Class: Insecta
- Order: Coleoptera
- Suborder: Polyphaga
- Infraorder: Cucujiformia
- Family: Cerambycidae
- Genus: Hexoplon
- Species: H. ctenostomoides

Binomial name
- Hexoplon ctenostomoides Thomson, 1867

= Hexoplon ctenostomoides =

Species of beetle

Hexoplon ctenostomoides is a species of beetle in the family Cerambycidae. It was described by Thomson in 1867. It is found in Brazil and Argentina.
