= Hypatopa ursella =

Scientific classification
- Kingdom: Animalia
- Phylum: Arthropoda
- Clade: Pancrustacea
- Class: Insecta
- Order: Lepidoptera
- Family: Blastobasidae
- Genus: Hypatopa
- Species: H. ursella

Binomial name
- Hypatopa ursella (Walsingham, 1907)

Synonyms
- Catacrypsis ursella Walsingham, 1907

Species of moth

Hypatopa ursella is a moth in the family Blastobasidae. It is found in the United States, including California.

The wingspan is about 18 mm.
