= Hypatopa solea =

Scientific classification
- Kingdom: Animalia
- Phylum: Arthropoda
- Clade: Pancrustacea
- Class: Insecta
- Order: Lepidoptera
- Family: Blastobasidae
- Genus: Hypatopa
- Species: H. solea

Binomial name
- Hypatopa solea Adamski, 2013

Species of moth

Hypatopa solea is a moth in the family Blastobasidae. It is found in Costa Rica.

The length of the forewings is 5–6.9 mm. The forewings are brown intermixed with pale-brown scales and a few dark-brown scales or dark brown intermixed with brown and a few pale-brown scales. The hindwings are translucent pale brown.

== Etymology ==
The specific name is derived from Latin solum (meaning a leather sole strapped on the foot, a sandal).
