= Pigritia fidella =

Scientific classification
- Kingdom: Animalia
- Phylum: Arthropoda
- Clade: Pancrustacea
- Class: Insecta
- Order: Lepidoptera
- Family: Blastobasidae
- Genus: Pigritia
- Species: P. fidella

Binomial name
- Pigritia fidella (Dietz, 1900)

Synonyms
- Ploiophora fidella Dietz, 1900

Species of moth

Pigritia fidella is a moth in the family Blastobasidae. It is found in the United States, including Pennsylvania, Maine and Washington DC.

The wingspan is about 12 millimeters (0.47 in). Adults have been recorded on wing in June and July.
