= Pigritia dido =

Scientific classification
- Kingdom: Animalia
- Phylum: Arthropoda
- Clade: Pancrustacea
- Class: Insecta
- Order: Lepidoptera
- Family: Blastobasidae
- Genus: Pigritia
- Species: P. dido

Binomial name
- Pigritia dido Adamski, 2013

Species of moth

Pigritia dido is a moth in the family Blastobasidae. It is found in Costa Rica.

The length of the forewings is 4–5.5 mm.

== Etymology ==
The specific name refers to Dido, founder of Carthage, daughter of Belus of Tyre, and sister of Pygmalion.
