= Hypatopa lucina =

Scientific classification
- Kingdom: Animalia
- Phylum: Arthropoda
- Clade: Pancrustacea
- Class: Insecta
- Order: Lepidoptera
- Family: Blastobasidae
- Genus: Hypatopa
- Species: H. lucina

Binomial name
- Hypatopa lucina Adamski, 2013

Species of moth

Hypatopa lucina is a moth in the family Blastobasidae. It is found in Costa Rica.

The length of the forewings is about 5.3 mm. Like many moths, its life cycle includes egg, larva, pupa and adult stages.
