= Hypatopa dolo =

Scientific classification
- Kingdom: Animalia
- Phylum: Arthropoda
- Clade: Pancrustacea
- Class: Insecta
- Order: Lepidoptera
- Family: Blastobasidae
- Genus: Hypatopa
- Species: H. dolo

Binomial name
- Hypatopa dolo Adamski, 2013

Species of moth

Hypatopa dolo is a moth in the family Blastobasidae. It is found in Costa Rica.

The length of the forewings is about 4.6 mm.

== Etymology ==
The specific name is derived from Latin dolo (meaning a pike, the weapon).
