= Hypatopa ibericella =

Scientific classification
- Kingdom: Animalia
- Phylum: Arthropoda
- Clade: Pancrustacea
- Class: Insecta
- Order: Lepidoptera
- Family: Blastobasidae
- Genus: Hypatopa
- Species: H. ibericella

Binomial name
- Hypatopa ibericella Sinev, 2007

Species of moth

Hypatopa ibericella is a moth in the family Blastobasidae. It is found in Spain.
