= Hypatopa silvestrella =

Scientific classification
- Domain: Eukaryota
- Kingdom: Animalia
- Phylum: Arthropoda
- Class: Insecta
- Order: Lepidoptera
- Family: Blastobasidae
- Genus: Hypatopa
- Species: H. silvestrella

Binomial name
- Hypatopa silvestrella Kuznetsov, 1984

Species of moth

Hypatopa silvestrella is a moth in the family Blastobasidae. It was described by Vladimir Ivanovitsch Kuznetsov in 1984. It is found in Russia.
