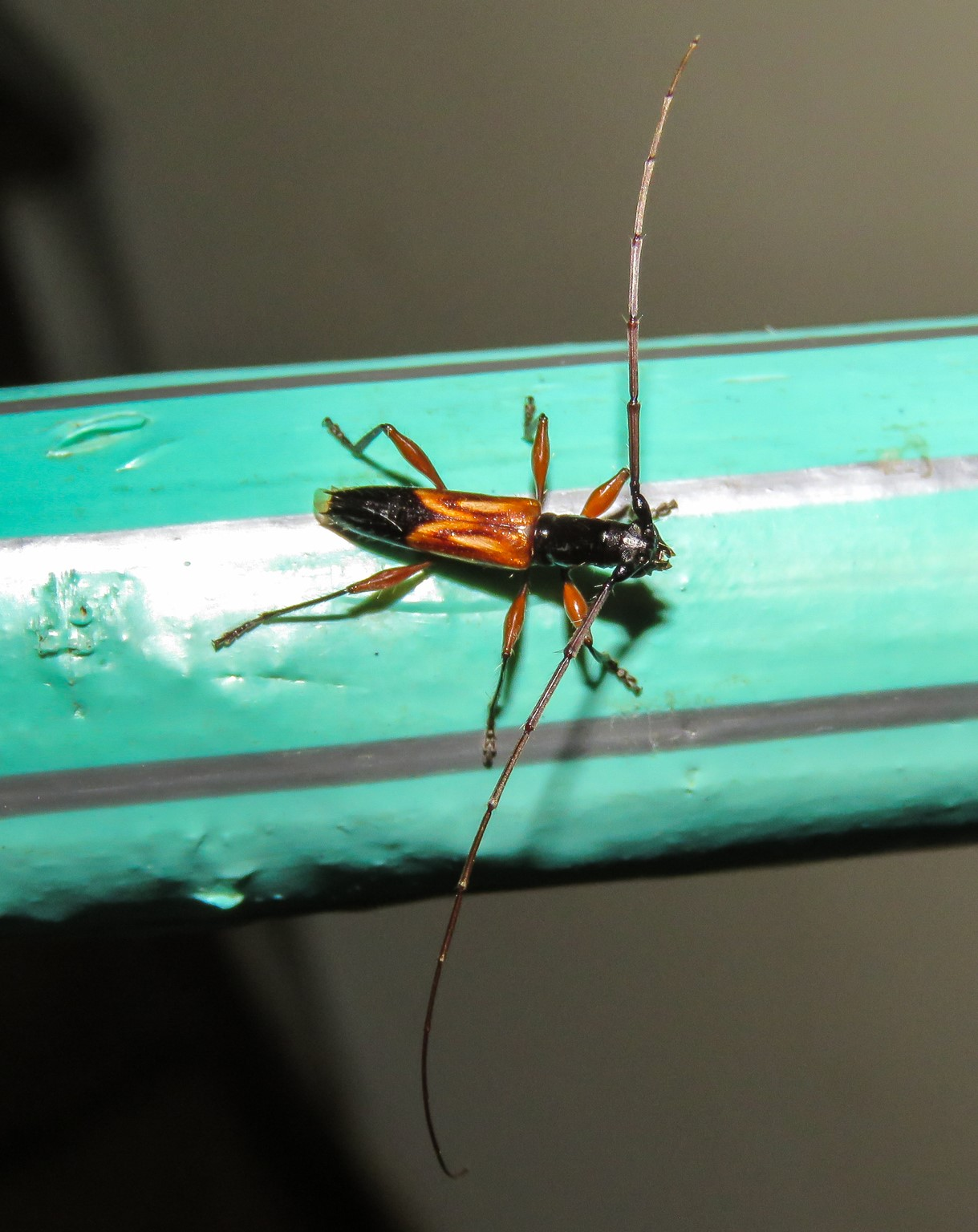

Scientific classification
- Domain: Eukaryota
- Kingdom: Animalia
- Phylum: Arthropoda
- Class: Insecta
- Order: Coleoptera
- Suborder: Polyphaga
- Infraorder: Cucujiformia
- Family: Cerambycidae
- Genus: Hexoplon
- Species: H. speciosum

Binomial name
- Hexoplon speciosum Bacon, 1937

= Hexoplon speciosum =

Species of beetle

Hexoplon speciosum is a species of beetle in the family Cerambycidae. It was described by Dr. Coleman Bacon in 1937.
