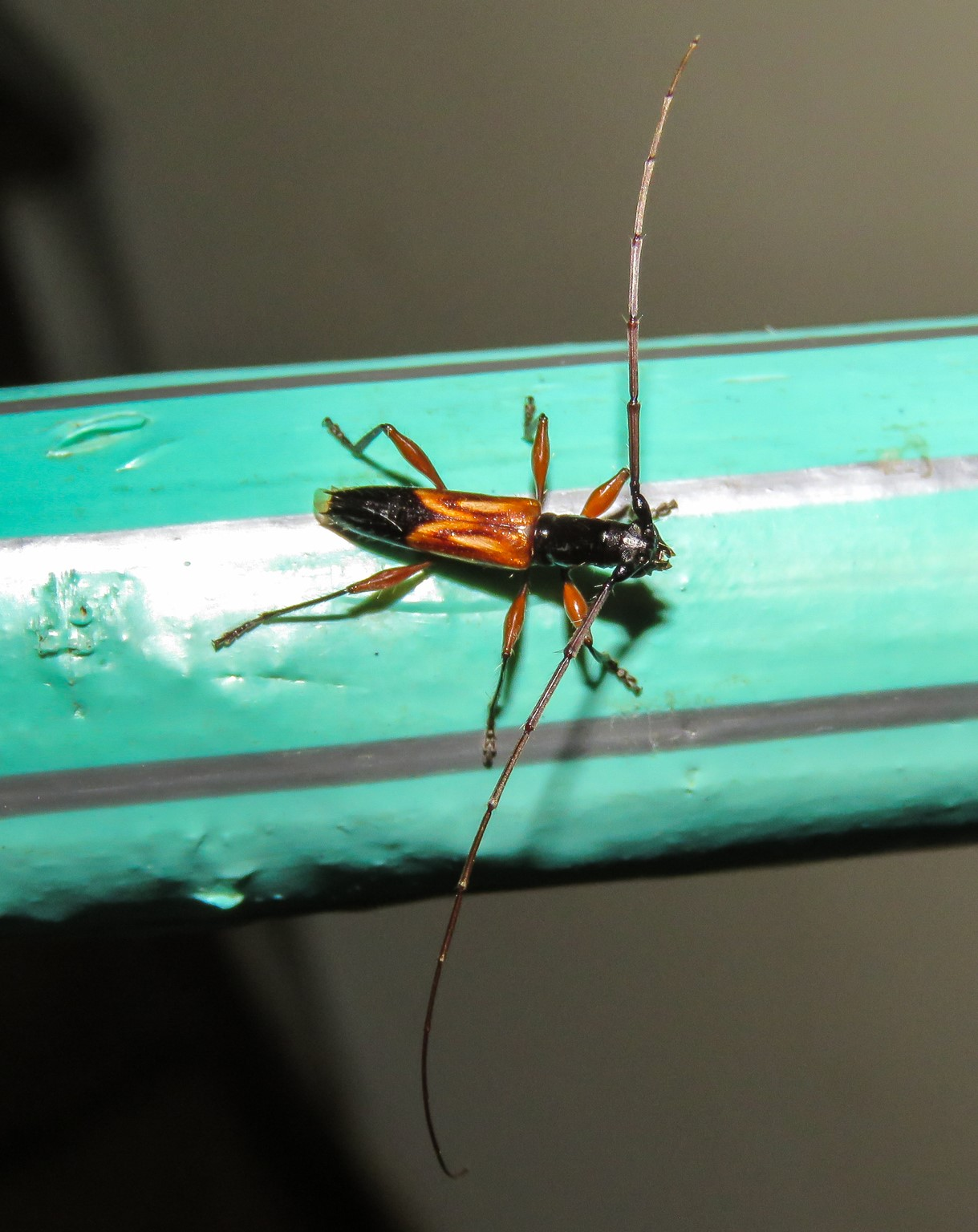
- Hexoplon speciosum

Scientific classification
- Domain: Eukaryota
- Kingdom: Animalia
- Phylum: Arthropoda
- Class: Insecta
- Order: Coleoptera
- Suborder: Polyphaga
- Infraorder: Cucujiformia
- Family: Cerambycidae
- Subfamily: Cerambycinae
- Tribe: Ibidionini
- Genus: Hexoplon; Thomson, 1864

= Hexoplon =

Genus of beetles

Hexoplon is a genus of beetles in the family Cerambycidae, containing the following species:

- Hexoplon affine (Thomson, 1865)
- Hexoplon albipenne Bates, 1872
- Hexoplon annulatum Martins & Galileo, 2011
- Hexoplon anthracinum Martins, 1967
- Hexoplon armatum Aurivillius, 1899
- Hexoplon bellulum Galileo & Martins, 2010
- Hexoplon bucki Martins, 1967
- Hexoplon calligrammum Bates, 1885
- Hexoplon carissimum (White, 1855)
- Hexoplon cearense Martins & Galileo, 1999
- Hexoplon ctenostomoides Thomson, 1867
- Hexoplon eximium Aurivillius, 1899
- Hexoplon illuminum Napp & Martins, 1985
- Hexoplon immaculatum Galileo & Martins, 2009
- Hexoplon integrum Tippmann, 1960
- Hexoplon juno Thomson, 1865
- Hexoplon leucostictum Martins, 1959
- Hexoplon longispina Aurivillius, 1899
- Hexoplon lucidum Martins, 1962
- Hexoplon navajasi Martins, 1959
- Hexoplon nigricolle Gounelle, 1909
- Hexoplon nigritarse Aurivillius, 1899
- Hexoplon nigropiceum Martins, 1959
- Hexoplon praetermissum Bates, 1870
- Hexoplon reinhardti Aurivillius, 1899
- Hexoplon rosalesi Martins, 1971
- Hexoplon scutellare Napp & Martins, 1985
- Hexoplon speciosum Fisher, 1937
- Hexoplon uncinatum Gounelle, 1909
- Hexoplon venus Thomson, 1864
