= Hypatopa caepae =

Scientific classification
- Kingdom: Animalia
- Phylum: Arthropoda
- Clade: Pancrustacea
- Class: Insecta
- Order: Lepidoptera
- Family: Blastobasidae
- Genus: Hypatopa
- Species: H. caepae

Binomial name
- Hypatopa caepae Adamski, 2013

Species of moth

Hypatopa caepae is a moth in the family Blastobasidae. It is found in Costa Rica.

The length of the forewings is about 4.5 mm.
