= Hypatopa arxcis =

Scientific classification
- Kingdom: Animalia
- Phylum: Arthropoda
- Clade: Pancrustacea
- Class: Insecta
- Order: Lepidoptera
- Family: Blastobasidae
- Genus: Hypatopa
- Species: H. arxcis

Binomial name
- Hypatopa arxcis Adamski, 2013

Species of moth

Hypatopa arxcis is a moth in the family Blastobasidae. It is usually found in Costa Rica.

The length of the forewings is 3.8 – 4.9mm.
