= Hexoplon affine =

Scientific classification
- Domain: Eukaryota
- Kingdom: Animalia
- Phylum: Arthropoda
- Class: Insecta
- Order: Coleoptera
- Suborder: Polyphaga
- Infraorder: Cucujiformia
- Family: Cerambycidae
- Genus: Hexoplon
- Species: H. affine

Binomial name
- Hexoplon affine (Thomson, 1865)

Species of beetle

Hexoplon affine is a species of beetle in the family Cerambycidae. It was described by Thomson in 1865.
