= Hypatopa morrisoni =

Scientific classification
- Domain: Eukaryota
- Kingdom: Animalia
- Phylum: Arthropoda
- Class: Insecta
- Order: Lepidoptera
- Family: Blastobasidae
- Genus: Hypatopa
- Species: H. morrisoni

Binomial name
- Hypatopa morrisoni (Walsingham, 1907)

Synonyms
- Catacrypsis morrisoni Walsingham, 1907

Species of moth

Hypatopa morrisoni is a moth in the family Blastobasidae. It is found in the United States, including Arizona.

The wingspan is about 17 mm. The forewings are bone-white, with grayish brown suffusion. The hindwings are shining pale brownish gray.
