= Hexoplon nigropiceum =

Scientific classification
- Domain: Eukaryota
- Kingdom: Animalia
- Phylum: Arthropoda
- Class: Insecta
- Order: Coleoptera
- Suborder: Polyphaga
- Infraorder: Cucujiformia
- Family: Cerambycidae
- Genus: Hexoplon
- Species: H. nigropiceum

Binomial name
- Hexoplon nigropiceum Martins, 1959

Species of beetle

Hexoplon nigropiceum is a species of beetle in the family Cerambycidae. It was described by Martins in 1959.
