= Hypatopa acus =

Scientific classification
- Kingdom: Animalia
- Phylum: Arthropoda
- Clade: Pancrustacea
- Class: Insecta
- Order: Lepidoptera
- Family: Blastobasidae
- Genus: Hypatopa
- Species: H. acus

Binomial name
- Hypatopa acus Adamski, 2013

Species of moth

Hypatopa acus is a moth in the family Blastobasidae. It is found in Costa Rica.

The length of the forewings is 4.4–4.7 mm.

== Etymology ==
The specific name is derived from Latin acus (meaning a needle).
