= Hexoplon bucki =

Scientific classification
- Domain: Eukaryota
- Kingdom: Animalia
- Phylum: Arthropoda
- Class: Insecta
- Order: Coleoptera
- Suborder: Polyphaga
- Infraorder: Cucujiformia
- Family: Cerambycidae
- Genus: Hexoplon
- Species: H. bucki

Binomial name
- Hexoplon bucki Martins, 1967

Species of beetle

Hexoplon bucki is a species of beetle in the family Cerambycidae. It was described by Martins in 1967.
