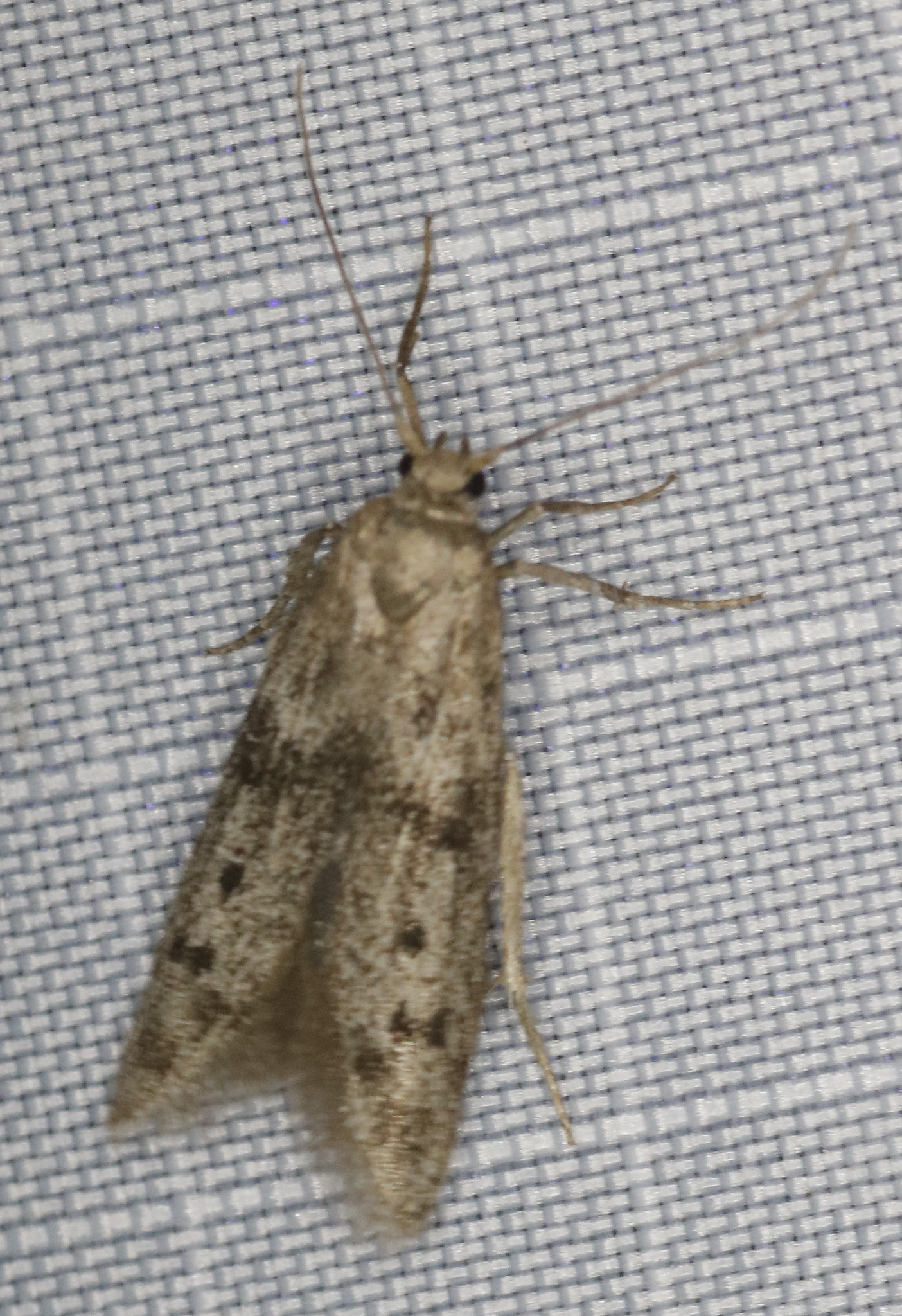

Scientific classification
- Kingdom: Animalia
- Phylum: Arthropoda
- Class: Insecta
- Order: Lepidoptera
- Family: Blastobasidae
- Genus: Hypatopa
- Species: H. titanella

Binomial name
- Hypatopa titanella McDunnough, 1961

= Hypatopa titanella =

Species of moth

Hypatopa titanella is a species of moth in the family Blastobasidae. It is found in North America, including Nova Scotia and Maine.
