= Pigritia biatomella =

Scientific classification
- Domain: Eukaryota
- Kingdom: Animalia
- Phylum: Arthropoda
- Class: Insecta
- Order: Lepidoptera
- Family: Blastobasidae
- Genus: Pigritia
- Species: P. biatomella

Binomial name
- Pigritia biatomella Walsingham, 1897

Species of moth

Pigritia biatomella is a moth in the family Blastobasidae. It was described by Thomas de Grey, 6th Baron Walsingham, in 1897. It is found in the West Indies.
