= Hypatopa eos =

Scientific classification
- Kingdom: Animalia
- Phylum: Arthropoda
- Clade: Pancrustacea
- Class: Insecta
- Order: Lepidoptera
- Family: Blastobasidae
- Genus: Hypatopa
- Species: H. eos

Binomial name
- Hypatopa eos Adamski, 2013

Species of moth

Hypatopa eos is a moth in the family Blastobasidae. It is found in Costa Rica.

The length of the forewings is about 3.3 mm. The forewings are pale brown intermixed with yellowish-brown and brown scales. The hindwings are translucent pale brown.

== Etymology ==
The specific name refers to Eos, one of the horses of the Sun.
