= Hypatopa verax =

Scientific classification
- Kingdom: Animalia
- Phylum: Arthropoda
- Clade: Pancrustacea
- Class: Insecta
- Order: Lepidoptera
- Family: Blastobasidae
- Genus: Hypatopa
- Species: H. verax

Binomial name
- Hypatopa verax Adamski, 2013

Species of moth

Hypatopa verax is a moth in the family Blastobasidae. It is found in Costa Rica.
