= Hexoplon armatum =

Scientific classification
- Domain: Eukaryota
- Kingdom: Animalia
- Phylum: Arthropoda
- Class: Insecta
- Order: Coleoptera
- Suborder: Polyphaga
- Infraorder: Cucujiformia
- Family: Cerambycidae
- Genus: Hexoplon
- Species: H. armatum

Binomial name
- Hexoplon armatum Aurivillius, 1899

Species of beetle

Hexoplon armatum is a species of beetle in the family Cerambycidae. It was described by Per Olof Christopher Aurivillius in 1899.
