= Hypatopa montivaga =

Scientific classification
- Kingdom: Animalia
- Phylum: Arthropoda
- Class: Insecta
- Order: Lepidoptera
- Family: Blastobasidae
- Genus: Hypatopa
- Species: H. montivaga

Binomial name
- Hypatopa montivaga Inoue et al., 1982

Synonyms
- Holcocera montivaga

Species of moth

Hypatopa montivaga is a species of moth in the family Blastobasidae. It was described by Hiroshi Inoue et al. in 1982. It is found in Japan.
