= Pigritia laticapitella =

Scientific classification
- Kingdom: Animalia
- Phylum: Arthropoda
- Clade: Pancrustacea
- Class: Insecta
- Order: Lepidoptera
- Family: Blastobasidae
- Genus: Pigritia
- Species: P. laticapitella

Binomial name
- Pigritia laticapitella Clemens, 1860

Synonyms
- Pigritia ochreella Clemens, 1863; Pigritia ochreela Adamski & Brown, 1989; Blastobasis aufugella Zeller, 1873; Blastobasis anfugella Dietz, 1900; Ploiophora ampla Dietz, 1900; Pigritia confusella Dietz, 1900; Pigritia purpurella Dietz, 1900; Pigritia basilarella Dietz, 1900; Pigritia basilorella Dietz, 1900; Pigritia mediofasciella Dietz, 1900; Pigritia ornatella Dietz, 1900; Pigritia angustipennella Dietz, 1900; Pigritia tristella Dietz, 1900; Pigritia obscurella Dietz, 1900; Pseudopigritia dorsomaculella Dietz, 1900; Pseudopigritia equitella Dietz, 1900; Pseudopigritia fraternella Dietz, 1900; Pseudopigritia argyreella Dietz, 1900; Pseudopigritia argyreela Adamski & Brown, 1989; Dryope occidentella Dietz, 1900; Dryope erratella Dietz, 1910

Species of moth

Pigritia laticapitella is a moth in the family Blastobasidae. It is found in the United States, including Texas, Kansas, California, New Jersey, Pennsylvania, Maine, Ohio and South Carolina.
