= Pigritia ochrocomella =

Scientific classification
- Kingdom: Animalia
- Phylum: Arthropoda
- Clade: Pancrustacea
- Class: Insecta
- Order: Lepidoptera
- Family: Blastobasidae
- Genus: Pigritia
- Species: P. ochrocomella

Binomial name
- Pigritia ochrocomella Clemens, 1863

Synonyms
- Pigritia ochroeomella Dietz, 1900; Epigritia heidemannella Dietz, 1900

Species of moth

Pigritia ochrocomella is a moth in the family Blastobasidae. It is found in the United States, including Pennsylvania and Maine.
