= Hexoplon cearense =

Scientific classification
- Domain: Eukaryota
- Kingdom: Animalia
- Phylum: Arthropoda
- Class: Insecta
- Order: Coleoptera
- Suborder: Polyphaga
- Infraorder: Cucujiformia
- Family: Cerambycidae
- Genus: Hexoplon
- Species: H. cearense

Binomial name
- Hexoplon cearense Martins & Galileo, 1999

Species of beetle

Hexoplon cearense is a species of beetle in the family Cerambycidae. It was described by Martins and Galileo in 1999.
