= Hypatopa moriutiella =

Scientific classification
- Kingdom: Animalia
- Phylum: Arthropoda
- Clade: Pancrustacea
- Class: Insecta
- Order: Lepidoptera
- Family: Blastobasidae
- Genus: Hypatopa
- Species: H. moriutiella

Binomial name
- Hypatopa moriutiella Sinev, 1986

Species of moth

Hypatopa moriutiella is a moth in the family Blastobasidae. It was described by Sinev in 1986. It is found in Russia.
