= Hypatopa nex =

Scientific classification
- Kingdom: Animalia
- Phylum: Arthropoda
- Clade: Pancrustacea
- Class: Insecta
- Order: Lepidoptera
- Family: Blastobasidae
- Genus: Hypatopa
- Species: H. nex

Binomial name
- Hypatopa nex Adamski, 2013

Species of moth

Hypatopa nex is a moth in the family Blastobasidae. It is found in Costa Rica.

The length of the forewings is 5–6 mm.

== Etymology ==
The specific name is derived from Latin nex (meaning a violent death).
