= Pigritia uuku =

Scientific classification
- Kingdom: Animalia
- Phylum: Arthropoda
- Clade: Pancrustacea
- Class: Insecta
- Order: Lepidoptera
- Family: Blastobasidae
- Genus: Pigritia
- Species: P. uuku

Binomial name
- Pigritia uuku Adamski, 2012

Species of moth

Pigritia uuku is a moth in the family Blastobasidae. It is found in Hawaii.
