= Hypatopa hulstella =

Scientific classification
- Domain: Eukaryota
- Kingdom: Animalia
- Phylum: Arthropoda
- Class: Insecta
- Order: Lepidoptera
- Family: Blastobasidae
- Genus: Hypatopa
- Species: H. hulstella

Binomial name
- Hypatopa hulstella (Dietz, 1910)

Synonyms
- Blastobasis hulstella Dietz, 1910

Species of moth

Hypatopa hulstella is a moth in the family Blastobasidae. It is found in the United States, including Maine.
