= Pigritia arizonella =

Scientific classification
- Kingdom: Animalia
- Phylum: Arthropoda
- Class: Insecta
- Order: Lepidoptera
- Family: Blastobasidae
- Genus: Pigritia
- Species: P. arizonella

Binomial name
- Pigritia arizonella Dietz, 1900

Species of moth

Pigritia arizonella is a moth in the family Blastobasidae. It is found in North America, including Arizona and California.
