= Hypatopa edax =

Scientific classification
- Kingdom: Animalia
- Phylum: Arthropoda
- Clade: Pancrustacea
- Class: Insecta
- Order: Lepidoptera
- Family: Blastobasidae
- Genus: Hypatopa
- Species: H. edax

Binomial name
- Hypatopa edax Adamski, 2013

Species of moth

Hypatopa edax is a moth in the family Blastobasidae. It is found in Costa Rica.

The length of the forewings is 4–4.2 mm.
