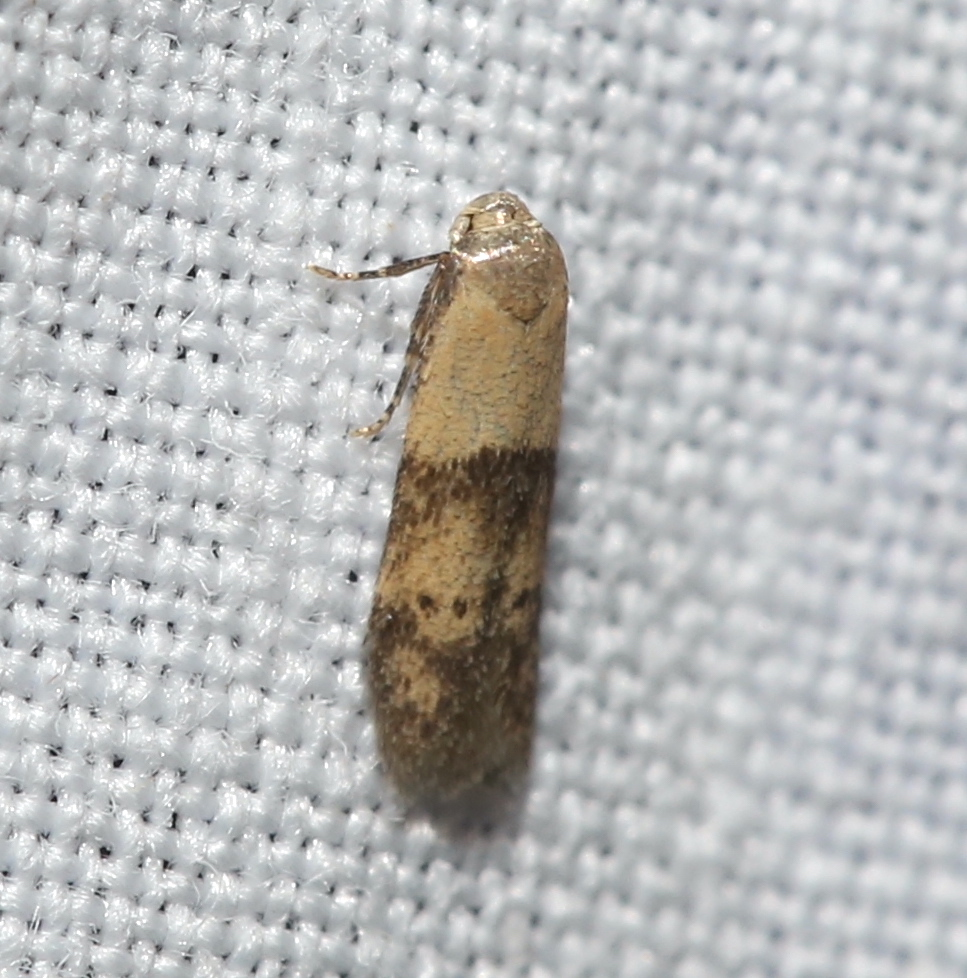

Scientific classification
- Kingdom: Animalia
- Phylum: Arthropoda
- Clade: Pancrustacea
- Class: Insecta
- Order: Lepidoptera
- Family: Blastobasidae
- Genus: Pigritia
- Species: P. murtfeldtella

Binomial name
- Pigritia murtfeldtella (Chambers, 1874)

Synonyms
- Dryope murtfeldtella Chambers, 1874; Dryope luteopulvella Chambers, 1875; Pigritia spoliatella Dietz, 1900; Hypatopa spoliatella; Epigritia pallidotinctella Dietz, 1900; Dryope tenebrella Dietz, 1900; Dryope minnicella Dietz, 1900; Dryope minnieella Dietz, 1900; Dryope grisella Dietz, 1900; Dryope fuscosuffusella Dietz, 1900; Dryope canariella Dietz, 1900; Dryope discopunctella Dietz, 1900; Dryope fenyesella Dietz, 1900

= Pigritia murtfeldtella =

Species of moth

Pigritia murtfeldtella is a moth in the family Blastobasidae. It is found in the United States, including Maine, Ohio, Kentucky, Pennsylvania, Georgia, Missouri, Texas and California.
