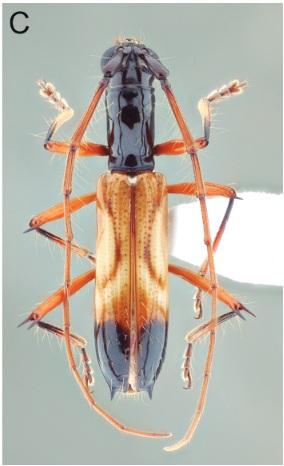

Scientific classification
- Kingdom: Animalia
- Phylum: Arthropoda
- Clade: Pancrustacea
- Class: Insecta
- Order: Coleoptera
- Suborder: Polyphaga
- Infraorder: Cucujiformia
- Family: Cerambycidae
- Genus: Hexoplon
- Species: H. juno

Binomial name
- Hexoplon juno Thomson, 1865

= Hexoplon juno =

Species of beetle

Hexoplon juno is a species of beetle in the family Cerambycidae. It was described by Thomson in 1865. It is found in Bolivia, Brazil, Paraguay and Argentina.
