= Greedy olalla rat =

Conservation status
- Data Deficient (IUCN 3.1)

Scientific classification
- Kingdom: Animalia
- Phylum: Chordata
- Class: Mammalia
- Infraclass: Placentalia
- Order: Rodentia
- Family: Echimyidae
- Genus: Olallamys
- Species: O. edax

Binomial name
- Olallamys edax (Thomas, 1916)
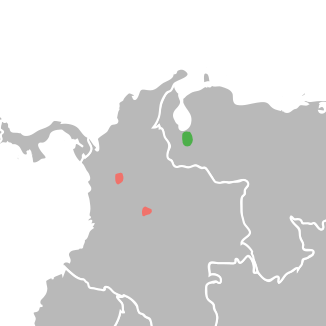
- Olallamys distribution O. edax in green

Species of rodent

The greedy olalla rat (Olallamys edax) is a species of rodent in the family Echimyidae. It is found in Colombia and Venezuela. Its natural habitat is subtropical or tropical moist lowland forests.

The species name edax is a Latin word meaning greedy.
