= Choko =

Choko may refer to:

== Language ==
- Chokó languages, an alternative name for the Choco languages
- Chöko, a Tibeto-Burman language

== People ==
- Hristo Nikolov-Choko, (born 1939) Bulgarian football player
- Isabelle Choko (born 1928), French concentration camp survivor and chess master
- Iida Chōko (飯田 蝶子; 1897–1972), Japanese actress
- Ikuta Chōkō (生田 長江; 1882-1936), Japanese translator, author and literary critic
- Choko Mabuchi (馬淵 テフ子; 1911–1985), Japanese female pilot
- Nikola "Choko" Kovač (born 1997), Professional Counter Strike 2 player derogatory nickname because of his frequent chokes in playoffs and in majors.

== Place ==
- Chōkō-ji, Buddhist temple, in Yashiro, Hyōgo Prefecture

== Other ==
- Choko (cup), a type of sake cup
- Choko (game) two-player abstract strategy board game
- Anopinella choko is a species of moth of the family Tortricidae
- Soba choko a type of sake cup
- An alternative name for Chayote, a green vegetable of the gourd family
- The name of a fictional character in Chokotto Sister

== See also ==
- Choco (disambiguation)
- Chocobi
- Chokocho
