= A. aurea =

A. aurea may refer to:

An abbreviation of a species name. In binomial nomenclature the name of a species is always the name of the genus to which the species belongs, followed by the species name (also called the species epithet). In A. aurea the genus name has been abbreviated to A. and the species has been spelled out in full. In a document that uses this abbreviation it should always be clear from the context which genus name has been abbreviated.

Some of the most common uses of A. aurea are:

- Adejeania aurea, a tachinid fly species
- Anopinella aurea, a moth species found in Ecuador
- Aratinga aurea, the peach-fronted parakeet or peach-fronted conure, a parrot species found in eastern Brazil, Bolivia, Paraguay, far northern Argentina and southern Suriname

== See also ==
- Aurea (disambiguation)
