= Anopinella araguana =

Scientific classification
- Kingdom: Animalia
- Phylum: Arthropoda
- Clade: Pancrustacea
- Class: Insecta
- Order: Lepidoptera
- Family: Tortricidae
- Genus: Anopinella
- Species: A. araguana

Binomial name
- Anopinella araguana Brown & Adamski, 2003

Species of moth

Anopinella araguana is a species of moth of the family Tortricidae. Formally described by John W. Brown and David Adamski in 2003, it is named after the Venezuelan state of Aragua, where it was first discovered. It is known only from the Venezuelan states of Aragua and Mérida, where it inhabits cloud forests at elevations of 1,100–2,300 m (3,600–7,500 ft). Adults of the species have a forewing length of 7–9 mm (0.28–0.35 in).

== Taxonomy ==
Prior to the description of the species, some specimens of Anopinella araguana had been considered to represent Anopinella ophiodes. Anopinella araguana was formally described in 2003 by John W. Brown and David Adamski based on an adult male specimen collected from Rancho Grande in the state of Aragua in Venezuela. It is named after the state in which it was discovered. It is part of the isodelta species group within the genus Anopinella and seems to be most closely related to A. razowksii. Specimens from the state of Mérida are slightly anomalous in the form of their male genitalia and their elevational range, and so may represent a different species.

== Description ==
Adults of Anopinella araguana have a forewing length of 7–9 mm (0.28–0.35 in). The frons, clypeus, and base of the antenna are a combination of light and dark brown. The hindwing is brown. The tegula and mesonotum of the thorax are a combination of light brown, reddish-brown, and plain brown.

== Distribution ==
Anopinella araguana is endemic to Venezuela, where it is known from Rancho Grande and near Tovar in Aragua, as well as the Mucuy Fish Hatchery in Mérida. It inhabits cloud forests at elevations of 1,100–2,300 m (3,600–7,500 ft).
