= Anopinella sympatrica =

Scientific classification
- Kingdom: Animalia
- Phylum: Arthropoda
- Clade: Pancrustacea
- Class: Insecta
- Order: Lepidoptera
- Family: Tortricidae
- Genus: Anopinella
- Species: A. sympatrica

Binomial name
- Anopinella sympatrica Brown & Adamski, 2003

Species of moth

Anopinella sympatrica is a species of moth of the family Tortricidae. Formally described by John W. Brown and David Adamski in 2003, it is named after the fact that it occurs in the same place as (i.e. is sympatric with) the moth A. mariana. It is endemic to Guatemala, where it is known only from its type locality of the Santa María volcano. Adults of this species have a forewing length of 8.2–12.0 mm (0.32–0.47 in).

== Taxonomy ==
The type specimen of Anopinella sympatrica, an adult male, was collected from the Santa María volcano in Guatemala and deposited in the United States National Museum by William Schaus and William Barnes; however, it was only identified as a novel species much later. Anopinella sympatrica was formally described in 2003 by John W. Brown and David Adamski based on the aforementioned specimen. It is named after the fact that it occurs in the same place as (i.e. is sympatric with) the moth A. mariana. It is part of the fana species group within the genus Anopinella and seems to be most closely related to A. rigidana.

== Description ==
Adults of Anopinella sympatrica have a forewing length of 8.2–12.0 mm (0.32–0.47 in). The frons and clypeus are yellowish-brown, the latter slightly lighter in color, while the base of the antenna is brown. The hindwing is light brown and is marked with oblique fuscous stripes. The tegula and mesonotum of the thorax are light brown.

== Distribution ==
Anopinella sympatrica is endemic to Guatemala, where it is known only from its type locality of the Santa María volcano.
