= Anopinella macrosema =

Scientific classification
- Kingdom: Animalia
- Phylum: Arthropoda
- Clade: Pancrustacea
- Class: Insecta
- Order: Lepidoptera
- Family: Tortricidae
- Genus: Anopinella
- Species: A. macrosema

Binomial name
- Anopinella macrosema Brown & Adamski, 2003

Species of moth

Anopinella macrosema is a species of moth of the family Tortricidae. It is found in Costa Rica.

The length of the forewings is 9.9–12 mm, making it one of the largest species in the genus.
