= Anopinella holandia =

Scientific classification
- Kingdom: Animalia
- Phylum: Arthropoda
- Clade: Pancrustacea
- Class: Insecta
- Order: Lepidoptera
- Family: Tortricidae
- Genus: Anopinella
- Species: A. holandia

Binomial name
- Anopinella holandia Brown & Adamski, 2003

Species of moth

Anopinella holandia is a species of moth of the family Tortricidae. Formally described by John W. Brown and David Adamski in 2003, it is named after the Finca Holandia farm where it was discovered. It is known from only one specimen, which was collected from that farm. This specimen has a forewing length of 9.1 mm (0.36 in).

== Taxonomy ==
The type specimen of Anopinella holandia, an adult male, was collected from the Finca Holandia farm in Guatemala in 1966 and deposited in the United States National Museum; however, it was only identified as a novel species much later. Anopinella holandia was formally described in 2003 by John W. Brown and David Adamski based on the aforementioned specimen. It is named after its type locality. It is part of the fana species group within the genus Anopinella and seems to be most similar to A. macrosema.

== Description ==
The only known specimen of Anopinella holandia is moderately-sized and has a forewing length of 9.1 mm (0.36 in). The frons and clypeus are light brown, while the base of the antenna is a combination of light and plain brown. The flagellomeres nearer the tip of the antennae are gray in color. The hindwing is light brown with indistinct oblique stripes. The tegula is a combination of light, plain, and reddish brown, while the mesonotum is light brown with plane brown on the sides.

== Distribution ==
Anopinella holandia is endemic to Guatemala, where it is known only from its type locality of the Finca Holandia in the Alta Verapaz Department.
