= Anopinella albolinea =

Scientific classification
- Kingdom: Animalia
- Phylum: Arthropoda
- Clade: Pancrustacea
- Class: Insecta
- Order: Lepidoptera
- Family: Tortricidae
- Genus: Anopinella
- Species: A. albolinea

Binomial name
- Anopinella albolinea Brown & Adamski, 2003

Species of moth

Anopinella albolinea is a species of moth of the family Tortricidae. It is found in Costa Rica.

The length of the forewings is about 8 mm.
