= Anopinella fana =

Scientific classification
- Kingdom: Animalia
- Phylum: Arthropoda
- Clade: Pancrustacea
- Class: Insecta
- Order: Lepidoptera
- Family: Tortricidae
- Genus: Anopinella
- Species: A. fana

Binomial name
- Anopinella fana Brown & Adamski, 2003

Species of moth

Anopinella fana is a species of moth of the family Tortricidae. Formally described by John W. Brown and David Adamski in 2003, its specific epithet is an arbitrary rhyming combination of letters. It is known only from the Venezuelan states of Aragua, where it has been recorded at an elevation of 1,100 m (3,600 ft). Adults of the species have a forewing length of 7.9–8.9 mm (0.31–0.35 in).

== Taxonomy ==
The type specimen of Anopinella fana, an adult male, was collected from Rancho Grande in the state of Aragua in Venezuela in 1966 and deposited in the United States National Museum; however, it was only identified as a novel species much later. Anopinella fana was formally described in 2003 by John W. Brown and David Adamski based on the aforementioned specimen. Its specific epithet is an arbitrary rhyming combination of letters, a nomenclatural scheme that was pioneered by William Kearfott and borrowed by Brown and Adamski. It is part of the fana species group within the genus Anopinella and seems to be most similar to A. brasiliana.

== Description ==
Adults of Anopinella fana have a forewing length of 7.9–8.9 mm (0.31–0.35 in). The frons, clypeus, and base of the antenna are a combination of light and dark brown. The hindwing is brown. The tegula and mesonotum of the thorax are a combination of light brown, reddish-brown, and plain brown.

== Distribution ==
Anopinella fana is endemic to Venezuela, where it is known only from Rancho Grande in Aragua. It is found at an elevation of 1,100 m (3,600 ft).
