= Anopinella isodelta =

Scientific classification
- Kingdom: Animalia
- Phylum: Arthropoda
- Class: Insecta
- Order: Lepidoptera
- Family: Tortricidae
- Genus: Anopinella
- Species: A. isodelta

Binomial name
- Anopinella isodelta (Meyrick, 1912)

Synonyms
- Eulia isodelta Meyrick, 1912

Species of moth

Anopinella isodelta is a species of moth of the family Tortricidae. It is endemic to Colombia.

The length of the fore wings is 8.2–9.3 mm.
