= Anopinella larana =

Scientific classification
- Kingdom: Animalia
- Phylum: Arthropoda
- Clade: Pancrustacea
- Class: Insecta
- Order: Lepidoptera
- Family: Tortricidae
- Genus: Anopinella
- Species: A. larana

Binomial name
- Anopinella larana Brown & Adamski, 2003

Species of moth

Anopinella larana is a species of moth of the family Tortricidae. Formally described by John W. Brown and David Adamski in 2003, it is named after the Venezuelan state of Lara, where it was first discovered. It is known from Venezuela and Ecuador, where it inhabits cloud forests at elevations of 1,477–2,400 m (4,846–7,874 ft). Adults of the species have a forewing length of 7.0–7.8 mm (0.28–0.31 in).

== Taxonomy ==
The type specimen of Anopinella larana, an adult male, was collected from Yacambú National Park in the state of Lara in Venezuela in 1978 and deposited in the United States National Museum; however, it was only identified as a novel species later on. Anopinella larana was formally described in 2003 by John W. Brown and David Adamski based on the aforementioned specimen. It is named after the state in which it was discovered. It is part of the fana species group within the genus Anopinella and seems to be most similar to A. phillipsae. It is even possible that these two species may be better treated as a single species, but this is unlikely because of their widely separated distributions.

== Description ==
Adults of Anopinella larana have a forewing length of 7.0–7.8 mm (0.28–0.31 in). The frons and clypeus are white, while the antennae are light yellow. The hindwing is light brown marked with indistinct oblique stripes. The tegula and mesonotum of the thorax are light yellow-brown.

== Distribution ==
Anopinella larana is found in Venezuela and Ecuador, where it is known from Yacambú National Park in Lara and Napo and Zamora-Chinchipe provinces in Ecuador. It inhabits cloud forests at elevations of 1,477–2,400 m (4,846–7,874 ft).
