= Anopinella tergemina =

Scientific classification
- Domain: Eukaryota
- Kingdom: Animalia
- Phylum: Arthropoda
- Class: Insecta
- Order: Lepidoptera
- Family: Tortricidae
- Genus: Anopinella
- Species: A. tergemina

Binomial name
- Anopinella tergemina Razowski & Wojtusiak, 2010

Species of moth

Anopinella tergemina is a species of moth of the family Tortricidae. It is found in Peru.

The wingspan is 21 mm.
