= Anopinella rotunda =

Scientific classification
- Domain: Eukaryota
- Kingdom: Animalia
- Phylum: Arthropoda
- Class: Insecta
- Order: Lepidoptera
- Family: Tortricidae
- Genus: Anopinella
- Species: A. rotunda

Binomial name
- Anopinella rotunda Razowski & Wojtusiak, 2010

Species of moth

Anopinella rotunda is a species of moth of the family Tortricidae. It is found in Peru.

The wingspan is 22 mm.
