= Anopinella razowskii =

Scientific classification
- Kingdom: Animalia
- Phylum: Arthropoda
- Clade: Pancrustacea
- Class: Insecta
- Order: Lepidoptera
- Family: Tortricidae
- Genus: Anopinella
- Species: A. razowskii

Binomial name
- Anopinella razowskii Brown & Adamski, 2003

Species of moth

Anopinella razowskii is a species of moth of the family Tortricidae. It is found in Brazil.

The length of the forewings is 6.6-8.1 mm.

The specific name honours Józef Razowski.
