= Anopinella peruvensis =

Scientific classification
- Kingdom: Animalia
- Phylum: Arthropoda
- Clade: Pancrustacea
- Class: Insecta
- Order: Lepidoptera
- Family: Tortricidae
- Genus: Anopinella
- Species: A. peruvensis

Binomial name
- Anopinella peruvensis Brown & Adamski, 2003

Species of moth

Anopinella peruvensis is a species of moth of the family Tortricidae. Formally described by John W. Brown and David Adamski in 2003, it is named after the country to which it is native. It is endemic to Peru, where it is known only from its type locality of the Inambari River near La Oroya in department of Junín. Adults of the species have a forewing length of 9.1–10.0 mm (0.36–0.39 in).

== Taxonomy ==
The type specimen of Anopinella peruvensis, an adult male, was collected from along the Inambari River in the department of Junín in Peru in 1904 and deposited in the British Museum (Natural History) in 1939; however, it was only identified as a novel species much later. Anopinella peruvensis was formally described in 2003 by John W. Brown and David Adamski based on the aforementioned specimen. It is named after the country to which it is native. It is part of the fana species group within the genus Anopinella and seems to be most similar to A. tucki. It is even possible that these two species may be better treated as a single species, but they continue to be separated based on differences in morphology and elevation.

== Description ==
The only known specimen of Anopinella peruvensis has a forewing length of 9.1–10.0 mm (0.36–0.39 in). The frons and clypeus are a combination of reddish and light brown, while the base of the antennae are light reddish-brown. The antennae is gray towards the tip. The hindwing is light fuscous. The tegula and mesonotum of the thorax are a combination of plain, reddish, and dark brown.

== Distribution ==
Anopinella peruvensis is endemic to southeastern Peru, where it is known only from its type locality of the Inambari River near La Oroya in department of Junín. It is found at an elevation of 954 m (3,130 ft).
