= Anopinella =

Scientific classification
- Kingdom: Animalia
- Phylum: Arthropoda
- Clade: Pancrustacea
- Class: Insecta
- Order: Lepidoptera
- Family: Tortricidae
- Subfamily: Tortricinae
- Tribe: Euliini
- Genus: Anopinella; Powell, 1986

Species
- See text

Synonyms
- Ecuadorica Razowski & Becker, 2000; Euadorica Razowski & Becker, 2000

Genus of tortrix moths

Anopinella is a genus of moths belonging to the family Tortricidae.

== Species ==
- fana species group
  - Anopinella alshiana Razowski & Pelz, 2003
  - Anopinella aurea Razowski & Becker, 2000
  - Anopinella boliviana Brown & Adamski, 2003
  - Anopinella brasiliana Brown & Adamski, 2003
  - Anopinella choko Brown & Adamski, 2003
  - Anopinella consecta Razowski & Pelz, 2003
  - Anopinella cuzco Brown & Adamski, 2003
  - Anopinella fana Brown & Adamski, 2003
  - Anopinella granadana Razowski & Wojtusiak, 2010
  - Anopinella holandia Brown & Adamski, 2003
  - Anopinella larana Brown & Adamski, 2003
  - Anopinella macrosema Brown & Adamski, 2003
  - Anopinella panamana Brown & Adamski, 2003
  - Anopinella perblanda Razowski & Becker, 2000
  - Anopinella peruvensis Brown & Adamski, 2003
  - Anopinella phillipsae Brown & Adamski, 2003
  - Anopinella rica Brown & Adamski, 2003
  - Anopinella rigidana Brown & Adamski, 2003
  - Anopinella rotunda Razowski & Wojtusiak, 2010
  - Anopinella sympatrica Brown & Adamski, 2003
  - Anopinella tenebricosa Razowski & Pelz, 2003
  - Anopinella tinalandana Brown & Adamski, 2003
  - Anopinella tucki Brown & Adamski, 2003
- isodelta species group
  - Anopinella albolinea Brown & Adamski, 2003
  - Anopinella araguana Brown & Adamski, 2003
  - Anopinella arenalana Brown & Adamski, 2003
  - Anopinella cafrosana Brown & Adamski, 2003
  - Anopinella carabayana Brown & Adamski, 2003
  - Anopinella cartagoa Brown & Adamski, 2003
  - Anopinella isodelta Meyrick, 1912
  - Anopinella mariana Brown & Adamski, 2003
  - Anopinella ophiodes Walsingham, 1914
  - Anopinella parambana Brown & Adamski, 2003
  - Anopinella porrasa Brown & Adamski, 2003
  - Anopinella powelli Brown & Adamski, 2003
  - Anopinella rastafariana Brown & Adamski, 2003
  - Anopinella razowskii Brown & Adamski, 2003
  - Anopinella tergemina Razowski & Wojtusiak, 2010
  - Anopinella transecta Brown & Adamski, 2003
  - Anopinella triquetra Walsingham, 1914
- styraxivora species group
  - Anopinella styraxivora Brown & Adamski, 2003
- unknown species group
  - Anopinella shillanana Razowski & Wojtusiak, 2009
  - Anopinella tariquiae Razowski & Wojtusiak, 2013
  - Anopinella yangana Razowski & Wojtusiak, 2009
