= Anopinella cuzco =

Scientific classification
- Kingdom: Animalia
- Phylum: Arthropoda
- Clade: Pancrustacea
- Class: Insecta
- Order: Lepidoptera
- Family: Tortricidae
- Genus: Anopinella
- Species: A. cuzco

Binomial name
- Anopinella cuzco Brown & Adamski, 2003

Species of moth

Anopinella cuzco is a species of moth of the family Tortricidae. Formally described by John W. Brown and David Adamski in 2003, it is named after the department in which it was found. It is endemic to Peru, where it is known only from its type locality of Pilcopata in the department of Cusco. Adults of the species have a forewing length of 7.9 mm (0.31 in).

== Taxonomy ==
The type specimen of Anopinella cuzco, an adult male, was collected from Pilcopata in the department of Cusco in Peru in 1982 and deposited in the British Museum (Natural History). Anopinella cuzco was formally described in 2003 by John W. Brown and David Adamski based on the aforementioned specimen. It is named after the department in which it was discovered. It is part of the fana species group within the genus Anopinella and seems to be most similar to A. choko. It is even possible that these two species may be better treated as a single species, but they continue to be separated based on differences in the morphology of their male genitalia and their widely separated distributions.

== Description ==
The only known specimen of Anopinella cuzco has a forewing length of 7.9 mm (0.31 in). The frons, clypeus, and base of the antennae are a combination of light and plain brown. The hindwing is plain brown. The tegula and mesonotum of the thorax are a combination of light, plain, and reddish brown.

== Distribution ==
Anopinella cuzco is endemic to Peru, where it is known only from its type locality of Pilcopata in Cuzco. It is found at an elevation of 1,000 m (3,300 ft).
