= Anopinella panamana =

Scientific classification
- Kingdom: Animalia
- Phylum: Arthropoda
- Clade: Pancrustacea
- Class: Insecta
- Order: Lepidoptera
- Family: Tortricidae
- Genus: Anopinella
- Species: A. panamana

Binomial name
- Anopinella panamana Brown & Adamski, 2003

Species of moth

Anopinella panamana is a species of moth of the family Tortricidae. Formally described by John W. Brown and David Adamski in 2003, it is named after the country in which it was discovered, Panama. It is endemic to Panama, where it is known only from the Río Trinidad. It is a somewhat small moth with a generally yellowish-brown appearance. Adults have a forewing length of 5.1–6.2 mm (0.20–0.24 in).

== Taxonomy ==
The type specimen of Anopinella panamana, an adult male, was collected from the Río Trinidad in Panama in 1912 and deposited in the United States National Museum; however, it was only identified as a novel species much later. Anopinella panamana was formally described in 2003 by John W. Brown and David Adamski based on the aforementioned specimen. It is named after the country to which it is native. It is part of the fana species group within the genus Anopinella

== Description ==
Anopinella panamana is a somewhat small moth with a generally yellowish-brown appearance. It has a forewing length of 5.1–6.2 mm (0.20–0.24 in). The clypeus is a combination of white, yellowish-brown, and orange-brown. The frons is yellowish-brown. The base of the antennae are a combination of white and light reddish-brown, while the flagellomeres nearer the tip of the antennae are yellowish-brown. The hindwing is fuscous. The tegula and mesonotum are a combination of white, plain brown, and yellowish-brown.

== Distribution ==
Anopinella panamana is endemic to Panama, where it is known only from its type locality of the Río Trinidad.
