= Anopinella rastafariana =

Scientific classification
- Kingdom: Animalia
- Phylum: Arthropoda
- Clade: Pancrustacea
- Class: Insecta
- Order: Lepidoptera
- Family: Tortricidae
- Genus: Anopinella
- Species: A. rastafariana

Binomial name
- Anopinella rastafariana Brown & Adamski, 2003

Species of moth

Anopinella rastafariana is a species of moth of the family Tortricidae. Formally described by John W. Brown and David Adamski in 2003, it is named after the Rastafari religion. It is endemic to Jamaica, where it is known from Portland Parish and Saint Catherine Parish. Adults of the species have a forewing length of 7.5–8.5 mm (0.30–0.33 in).

== Taxonomy ==
The type specimen of Anopinella rastafariana, an adult male, was collected from near Hardwar Gap in Jamaica in 1966 and deposited in the United States National Museum; however, it was only identified as a novel species much later. Anopinella rastafariana was formally described in 2003 by John W. Brown and David Adamski based on the aforementioned specimen. It is named after the Rastafari religion native to Jamaica. It is part of the isodelta species group within the genus Anopinella and seems to be most similar to A. arenalana.

== Description ==
Adults of Anopinella rastafariana have a forewing length of 7.5–8.5 mm (0.30–0.33 in). The frons and clypeus are light yellowish-brown, while the base of the antenna is light brown. The hindwing is maculated with a light grey ground colour. The tegula and mesonotum of the thorax are a combination of light yellowish-brown, plain brown, and reddish-brown.

== Distribution ==
Anopinella rastafariana is endemic to Jamaica, where it is known from near Hardwar Gap in Portland Parish and Mount Diablo in Saint Catherine Parish. It inhabits elevations of up to 850 m (2,790 ft).
