= Anopinella yangana =

Scientific classification
- Domain: Eukaryota
- Kingdom: Animalia
- Phylum: Arthropoda
- Class: Insecta
- Order: Lepidoptera
- Family: Tortricidae
- Genus: Anopinella
- Species: A. yangana

Binomial name
- Anopinella yangana Razowski & Wojtusiak, 2009

Species of moth

Anopinella yangana is a species of moth of the family Tortricidae. It is found in Ecuador.

The wingspan is about 19 mm.
