= Anopinella boliviana =

Scientific classification
- Kingdom: Animalia
- Phylum: Arthropoda
- Clade: Pancrustacea
- Class: Insecta
- Order: Lepidoptera
- Family: Tortricidae
- Genus: Anopinella
- Species: A. boliviana

Binomial name
- Anopinella boliviana Brown & Adamski, 2003

Species of moth

Anopinella boliviana is a species of moth of the family Tortricidae.Formally described by John W. Brown and David Adamski in 2003, it is named after the country of Bolivia, where it was first discovered. It is known from only one specimen, which was collected in the "Yungas de la Paz". This specimen has a forewing length of 9.5 mm (0.37 in).

== Taxonomy ==
The type specimen of Anopinella boliviana, an adult female, was collected from "Yungas de la Paz" in Bolivia in 1908 and deposited in the British Museum (Natural History) as part of the Walsingham Collection; however, it was only identified as a novel species much later. Anopinella boliviana was formally described in 2003 by John W. Brown and David Adamski based on the aforementioned specimen. It is named after the country in which it was discovered. It is part of the fana species group within the genus Anopinella and seems to be most closely related to A. brasiliana.

== Description ==
The only known specimen of Anopinella boliviana has a forewing length of 9.5 mm (0.37 in). The frons and clypeus are a combination of light and dark brown, while the base of the antenna is reddish-brown. The hindwing is pale fuscous. The tegula and mesonotum of the thorax are a combination of light and plain brown.

== Distribution ==
Anopinella boliviana is endemic to Bolivia, where it is known only from its type locality of "Yungas de la Paz".
