= Anopinella shillanana =

Scientific classification
- Domain: Eukaryota
- Kingdom: Animalia
- Phylum: Arthropoda
- Class: Insecta
- Order: Lepidoptera
- Family: Tortricidae
- Genus: Anopinella
- Species: A. shillanana

Binomial name
- Anopinella shillanana Razowski & Wojtusiak, 2009

Species of moth

Anopinella shillanana is a species of moth of the family Tortricidae. It is found in Ecuador.

The wingspan is about 18.5 mm.
