= Anopinella tenebricosa =

Scientific classification
- Kingdom: Animalia
- Phylum: Arthropoda
- Class: Insecta
- Order: Lepidoptera
- Family: Tortricidae
- Genus: Anopinella
- Species: A. tenebricosa

Binomial name
- Anopinella tenebricosa Razowski & Pelz, 2003

Species of moth

Anopinella tenebricosa is a species of moth of the family Tortricidae. It is found in Ecuador.
