= Anopinella brasiliana =

Scientific classification
- Kingdom: Animalia
- Phylum: Arthropoda
- Clade: Pancrustacea
- Class: Insecta
- Order: Lepidoptera
- Family: Tortricidae
- Genus: Anopinella
- Species: A. brasiliana

Binomial name
- Anopinella brasiliana Brown & Adamski, 2003

Species of moth

Anopinella brasiliana is a species of moth of the family Tortricidae. Formally described by John W. Brown and David Adamski in 2003, it is named after the country of Brazil, where it was first discovered. It is native to Brazil and Paraguay, where it has been recorded at elevations of 720–1,000 m (2,360–3,280 ft). Thy are thought to feed on Vernonia plants. Adults of the species have a forewing length of 8.1–10.1 mm (0.32–0.40 in).

== Taxonomy ==
Anopinella brasiliana was formally described in 2003 by John W. Brown and David Adamski based on an adult male specimen collected from Sete Lagoas in the state of Minas Gerais in Brazil. It is named after the country in which it was discovered. It is part of the fana species group within the genus Anopinella

== Description ==
Adults of Anopinella brasiliana have a forewing length of 8.1–10.1 mm (0.32–0.40 in). The frons, clypeus, and base of the antenna are light brown, occasioally with some darker brown maculations. The flagellomeres towards the tip of the antennae are grayish in color. The hindwing is brownish with oblique darker brown stripes. The tegula and mesonotum of the thorax are a combination of light brown, reddish-brown, and plain brown.

== Distribution ==
Anopinella brasiliana is native to Brazil and Paraguay. In Brazil, it is known from the Federal District and the states of Minas Gerais, Paraná, Rio de Janeiro, and São Paulo, while in Paraguay, it is known from Sapucaí in Paraguarí Department. It has been recorded at elevations of 720–1,000 m (2,360–3,280 ft). The species is thought to have host plants of the genus Vernonia, as the holotype was collected from an "assa-peixe" plant; some Vernonia plants are known by the name assa-peixe in Portuguese.
