= Anopinella triquetra =

Scientific classification
- Domain: Eukaryota
- Kingdom: Animalia
- Phylum: Arthropoda
- Class: Insecta
- Order: Lepidoptera
- Family: Tortricidae
- Genus: Anopinella
- Species: A. triquetra

Binomial name
- Anopinella triquetra (Walsingham, 1914)

Synonyms
- Tortrix triquetra Walsingham 1914; Seticosta triquetra

Species of moth

Anopinella triquetra is a species of moth of the family Tortricidae. It is found in Guatemala. Specimens from Honduras and Costa Rica might be two separate species.

The length of the fore wings is 7–9.5 mm. The forewings are whitish with a slight ochreous tinge. The hindwings are tawny grey.
