= Choco =

Choco or Chocó may refer to:

== Geography and culture ==
- El Chocó, a region in western Colombia and adjacent parts of Panama and Ecuador
  - Chocó–Darién moist forests
  - Pacific/Chocó natural region
- Chocó Department, Colombia
- Choco District, Peru
- Choco languages, a family of Native American languages in Colombia and Panama
- Chocó people, former name of the Embera-Wounaan, a group of semi-nomadic Indians in Panama

== People ==
- Choco (footballer, born 4 January 1990), João Guilherme Estevão da Silva, Brazilian football striker
- Choco (footballer, born 18 January 1990), Guilherme de Souza, Brazilian football right-back
- Choco Orta (born 1959), Puerto Rican musician, dancer, and actress
- Anthony Lozano (born 1993), nicknamed Choco, Honduran footballer
- Mark Williams (Australian footballer, born 1958), nicknamed Choco, Australian rules football player and coach

== Technology ==
- choco, the command used to start the Chocolatey command-line package manager.

== See also ==
- Chocolate
- Choko (disambiguation)
- Cocoa bean
