= Anopinella tariquiae =

Scientific classification
- Domain: Eukaryota
- Kingdom: Animalia
- Phylum: Arthropoda
- Class: Insecta
- Order: Lepidoptera
- Family: Tortricidae
- Genus: Anopinella
- Species: A. tariquiae

Binomial name
- Anopinella tariquiae Razowski & Wojtusiak, 2013

Species of moth

Anopinella tariquiae is a species of moth of the family Tortricidae. It is found in Bolivia.

The wingspan is about 14.5 mm (0.57 in).
