= Anopinella transecta =

Scientific classification
- Kingdom: Animalia
- Phylum: Arthropoda
- Clade: Pancrustacea
- Class: Insecta
- Order: Lepidoptera
- Family: Tortricidae
- Genus: Anopinella
- Species: A. transecta

Binomial name
- Anopinella transecta Brown & Adamski, 2003

Species of moth

Anopinella transecta is a species of moth of the family Tortricidae. It is found in Costa Rica.

The length of the forewings is 5.9-6.2 mm.
