= Anopinella tucki =

Scientific classification
- Kingdom: Animalia
- Phylum: Arthropoda
- Clade: Pancrustacea
- Class: Insecta
- Order: Lepidoptera
- Family: Tortricidae
- Genus: Anopinella
- Species: A. tucki

Binomial name
- Anopinella tucki Brown & Adamski, 2003

Species of moth

Anopinella tucki is a species of moth of the family Tortricidae. Formally described by John W. Brown and David Adamski in 2003, it is named after Kevin Tuck, a worker at the British Museum who worked on torticid moths. It is endemic to Peru, where it is known only from its type locality of Oconeque in Carabaya province in the department of Puno. Adults of the species have a forewing length of 10.0 mm (0.39 in).

== Taxonomy ==
The type specimen of Anopinella tucki, an adult male, was collected from Oconeque in the department of Puno in Peru in 1904 and deposited in the British Museum (Natural History) in 1939; however, it was only identified as a novel species much later. Anopinella tucki was formally described in 2003 by John W. Brown and David Adamski based on the aforementioned specimen. It is named after Kevin Tuck, a worker at the British Museum who worked on torticid moths. It is part of the fana species group within the genus Anopinella and seems to be most similar to A. peruvensis. It is even possible that these two species may be better treated as a single species, but they continue to be separated based on differences in morphology and elevation.

== Description ==
The only known specimen of Anopinella tucki has a forewing length of 10.0 mm (0.39 in). The frons, clypeus, and base of the antennae are pale brown. The hindwing is light fuscous. The tegula and mesonotum of the thorax are a combination of light and plain brown.

== Distribution ==
Anopinella tucki is endemic to Peru, where it is known only from its type locality of Oconeque in Carabaya province. It is found at an elevation of 2,154 m (7,067 ft).
