= Anopinella rigidana =

Scientific classification
- Kingdom: Animalia
- Phylum: Arthropoda
- Clade: Pancrustacea
- Class: Insecta
- Order: Lepidoptera
- Family: Tortricidae
- Genus: Anopinella
- Species: A. rigidana

Binomial name
- Anopinella rigidana Brown & Adamski, 2003

Species of moth

Anopinella rigidana is a species of moth of the family Tortricidae. It is found in Costa Rica.

The length of the forewings is about 10.2 millimetres (0.40 in).
