= Anopinella mariana =

Scientific classification
- Kingdom: Animalia
- Phylum: Arthropoda
- Clade: Pancrustacea
- Class: Insecta
- Order: Lepidoptera
- Family: Tortricidae
- Genus: Anopinella
- Species: A. mariana

Binomial name
- Anopinella mariana Brown & Adamski, 2003

Species of moth

Anopinella mariana is a species of moth of the family Tortricidae. Formally described by John W. Brown and David Adamski in 2003, it is named after the Santa María volcano on which it was discovered. It is known from only one specimen, which was collected from that volcano in Guatemala. This specimen has a forewing length of 10.2 mm (0.40 in).

== Taxonomy ==
The type specimen of Anopinella mariana, an adult male, was collected from the Santa María volcano in Guatemala at an unknown date and deposited in the United States National Museum by William Schaus and William Barnes; however, it was only identified as a novel species much later. Anopinella mariana was formally described in 2003 by John W. Brown and David Adamski based on the aforementioned specimen. It is named after the volcano on which it was discovered. It is part of the isodelta species group within the genus Anopinella and seems to be most similar to A. carabayana.

== Description ==
The only known specimen of Anopinella mariana has a forewing length of 10.2 mm (0.40 in). The frons and clypeus are combination of dark brown and white in color, while the base of the antenna is a combination of brown and white. The hindwing is light brown with oblique maculations. The tegula and mesonotum of the thorax are plain brown.

== Distribution ==
Anopinella mariana is endemic to Guatemala, where it is known only from its type locality of the Santa María volcano.
