= Anopinella aurea =

Scientific classification
- Kingdom: Animalia
- Phylum: Arthropoda
- Clade: Pancrustacea
- Class: Insecta
- Order: Lepidoptera
- Family: Tortricidae
- Genus: Anopinella
- Species: A. aurea

Binomial name
- Anopinella aurea (Razowski & Becker, 2000)

Synonyms
- Ecuadorica aurea Razowski & Becker, 2000

Species of moth

Anopinella aurea is a species of moth of the family Tortricidae. It is found in Ecuador.
