= Soba choko =

Type of Japanese porcelain vessels

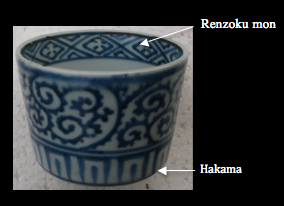
Soba choko parts

Soba choko (Japanese: そば猪口, romanized: sobachoko) are 3–9 cm cup-sized Japanese porcelain vessels, suitable for drinking sake or Japanese tea, or for eating soba noodles. They were mass-produced for domestic use in Japan in the Edo Imari period (1620–1886), traditionally sold in sets of five, often non-matching.

== History ==
Soba choko is thought by most scholars to be derived from the Korean word chonchi or chongka- meaning 'wine cup' or 'bowl'. Originally, soba choko were used as spice holders or drinking vessels, but later became primarily used to hold sauce for dipping noodles Ogawa Keishi and Nakano Tari. Soba choko were produced and used 60 years earlier. Nakano sites record that the first noodles were eaten in the Kan'ei era (1620s), but they were not commercialised until the 1710s. Soba choko was produced in various regions of Japan, including Imari/Arita (Hizen) in Kyushu, Seto in Aichi, Kirikomi in Sendai and Oda in Tosa. Each region produced its own unique design.

=== Imari production eras ===
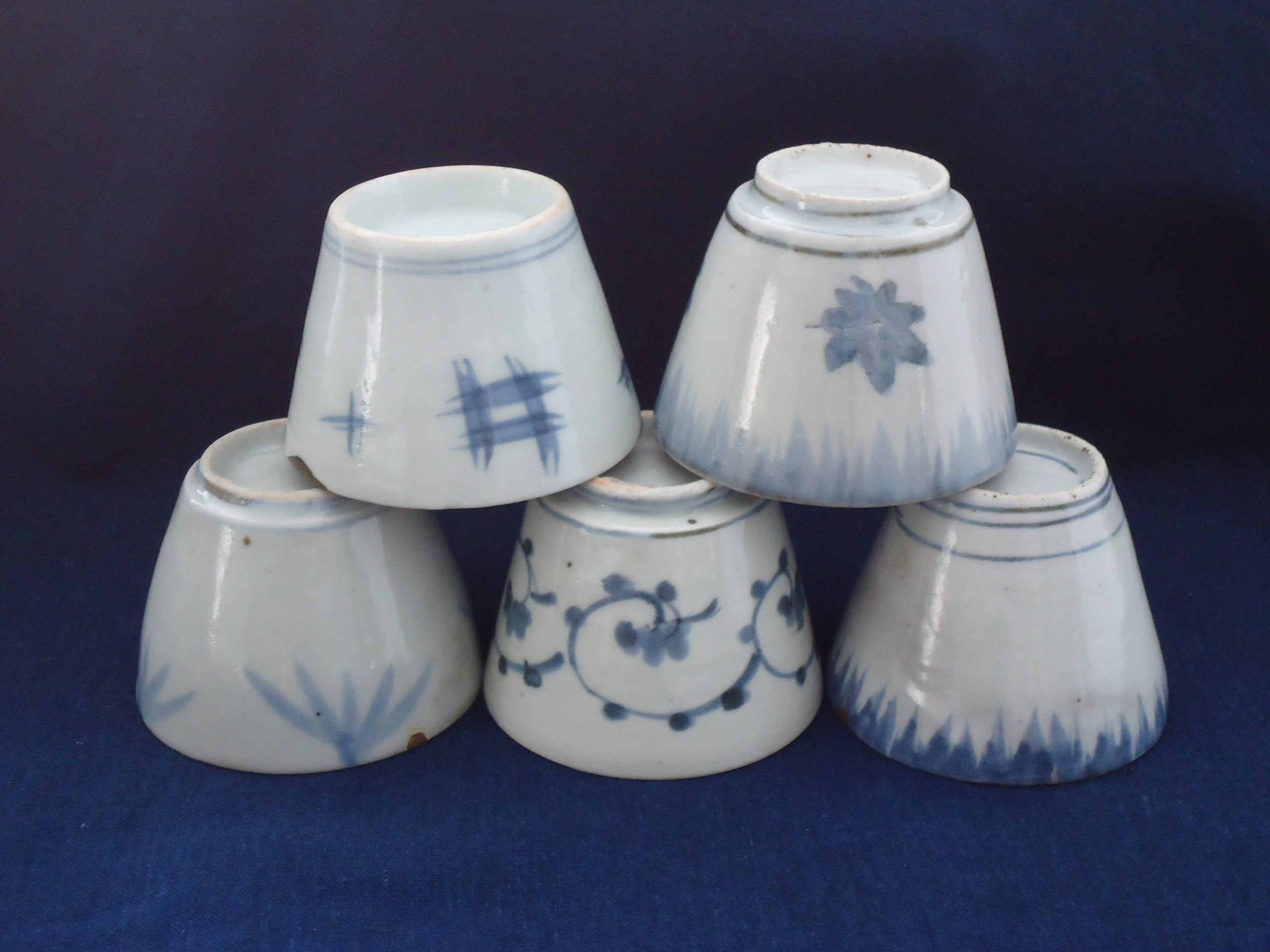
Typical styles of early ko-Imari Shoki soba choko. They have heavy bases, thick glazes and used inban (stencils) in designs.

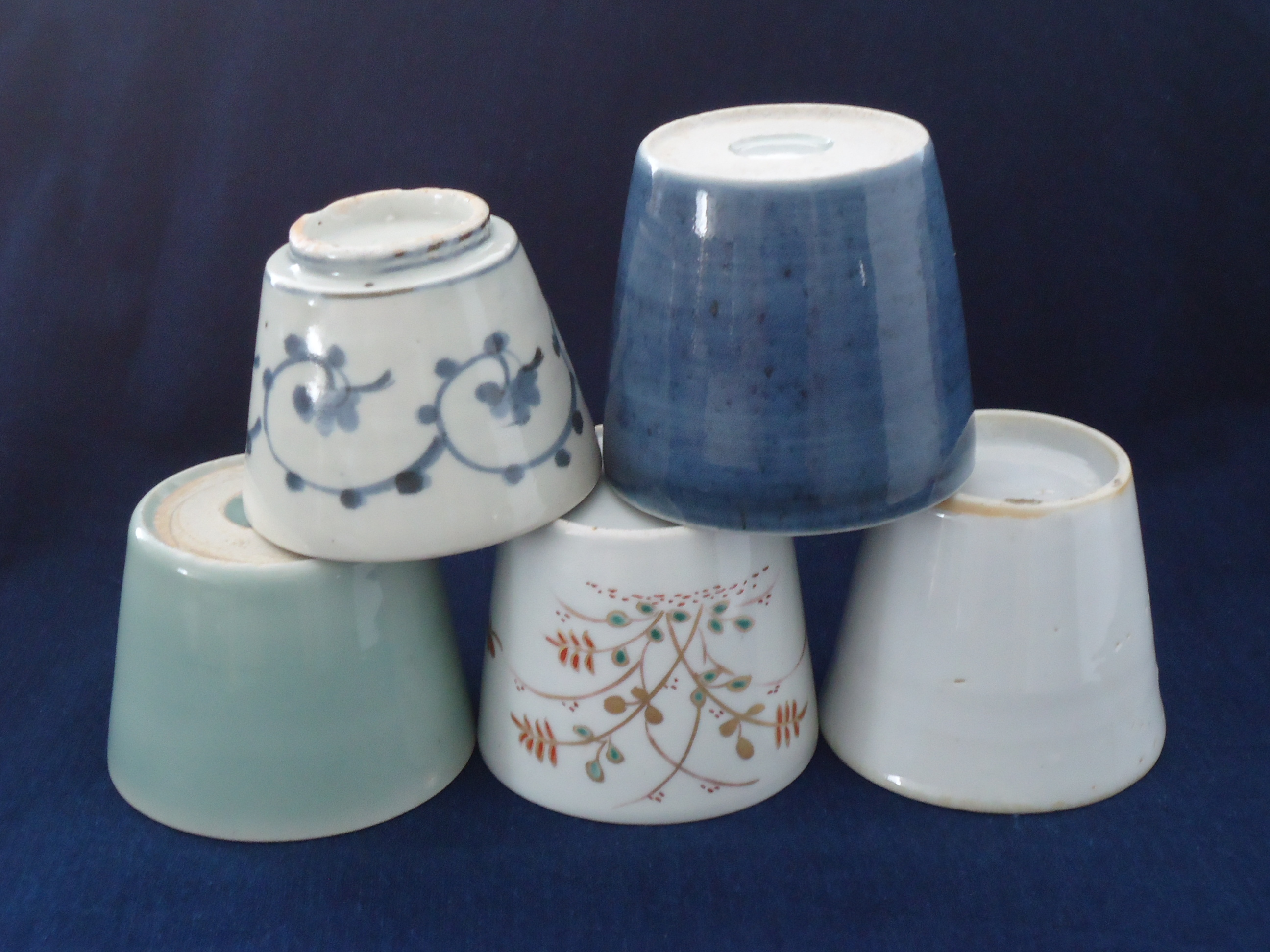
Shoki, Chuki and Koki period colour styles

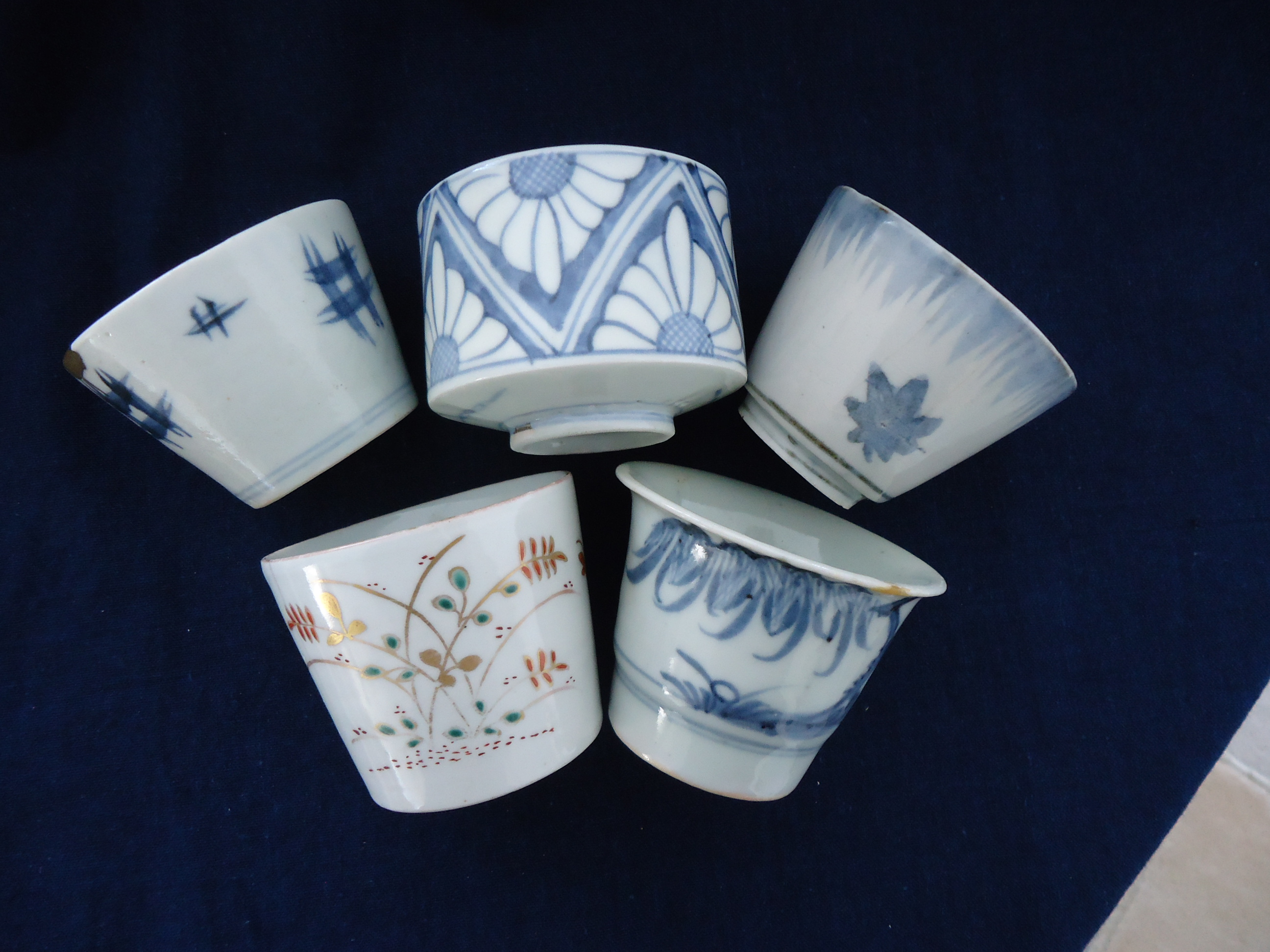
These soba chokos depict the typical production styles used across the ko-Imari period.

Dating Edo era (ko-Imari), soba choko production falls into three distinct periods, Shoki period (1620–1720), Chuki period (1721–1788) and the Koki period (1789–1867). Experts are not unanimous on dating early ko-Imari. Soba choko produced in the Meiji (1886–1912), Taisho (1912–1926) and early Showa periods (1926–1940s) saw a change in design and production.

- Shoki period soba choko (1620–1720; Genwa–Kyoho eras) generally featured often disfigured, thick sides and bases with oxide assuming a washed-out appearance through a thicker clear glaze. Traditional design were hand painted and also used stencils or stamping, known as inban. The soba choko was generally heavy in feel.
- Chuki period soba choko (1720–1788) saw kiln stamps appear and the quality of glazes and porcelain bodies improved. These early to mid-era choko featured thin bases and rims, no kiln or era marks ('mikomi-moyo') and no top inner border markings (Renzoku mon). It was only in the last few years of Chuki leading into the Koki period did kiln marks and seals and top inner border patterns started to change.
- Koki period soba choko spanned the final 78 years of Edo (1789–1867). The underside base featured an 'eyeball' style circle (Janome kodai), used kiln marks, had decorative inner borders, and also featured at the time decorative top rims.

== Designs ==
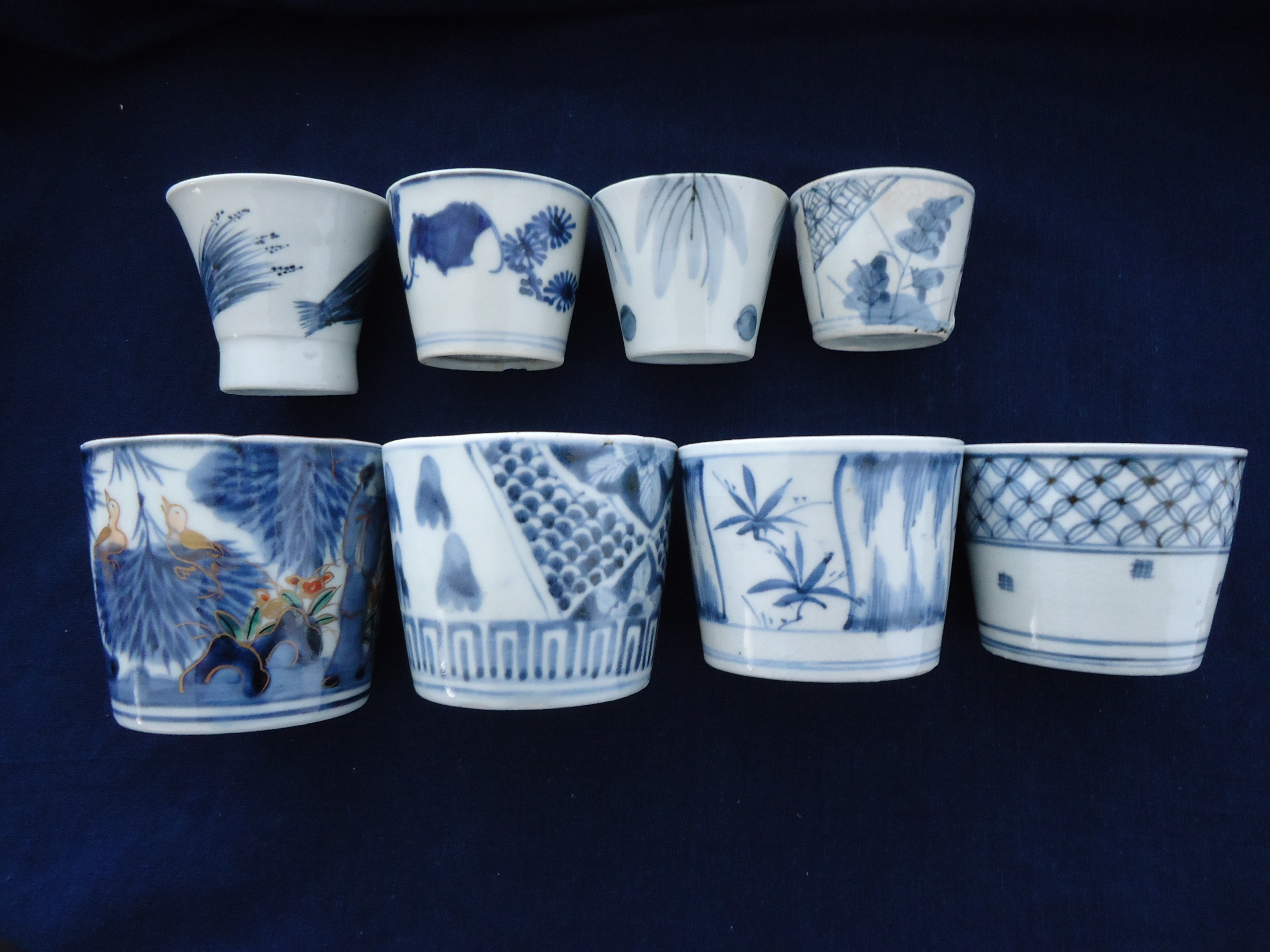
Soba choko came in a variety of different sizes. The smallest choko were commonly used for sake and were called nozoki.

Traditional designs were applied to the porcelain body using cobalt oxide, followed by a coat of clear glaze. The more intricate the design and the whiter the porcelain, the higher the class production is typically. Designs were hand-painted or stenciled in freeform, embedded in frames or placed within bands. Four main design categories were used and included:

- Plants – symbolising prosperity, health and long life
- Landscapes – sea, mountains, temples, garden scenes
- Mingei – geometrics, repeating patterns, seasonal images such as harvests
- Animals – horses, fish, birds, bats, turtles, seaweed, clams and dragons

=== Border ===
Border designs, referred to as renzoku mon, were in the later few years of the Chuki period and used almost exclusively across the entire Koki period up until the Taisho period. A variety of design techniques were used, with the most common being a triangle or diamond style contained within a thin band. At times, the top inner design was mirrored in the mikomi.

=== Stamp ===
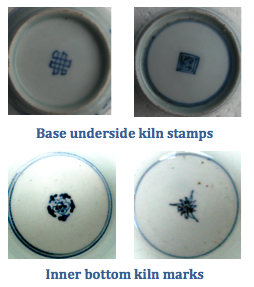
Soba choko kiln stamp design, 'mikomi-moyo'

Two main stamps or seals were commonly placed on soba choko either inside the vessel or on the upper middle bottom of the base.

The use of these stamps or seals emerged in the mid-to-late Chuki period and was common in the Koki period. Very few soba choko had inside and outside stamps in the earlier Shoki period. The exceptions are referred to as index choko that feature a Chuki period base but also include a 'mikomi-moyo' on the inside bottom.

=== Bases ===
The soba choko bases (renzoku mon or uwa-buchi) were unique to each period. The pictures below depict typical period styles.

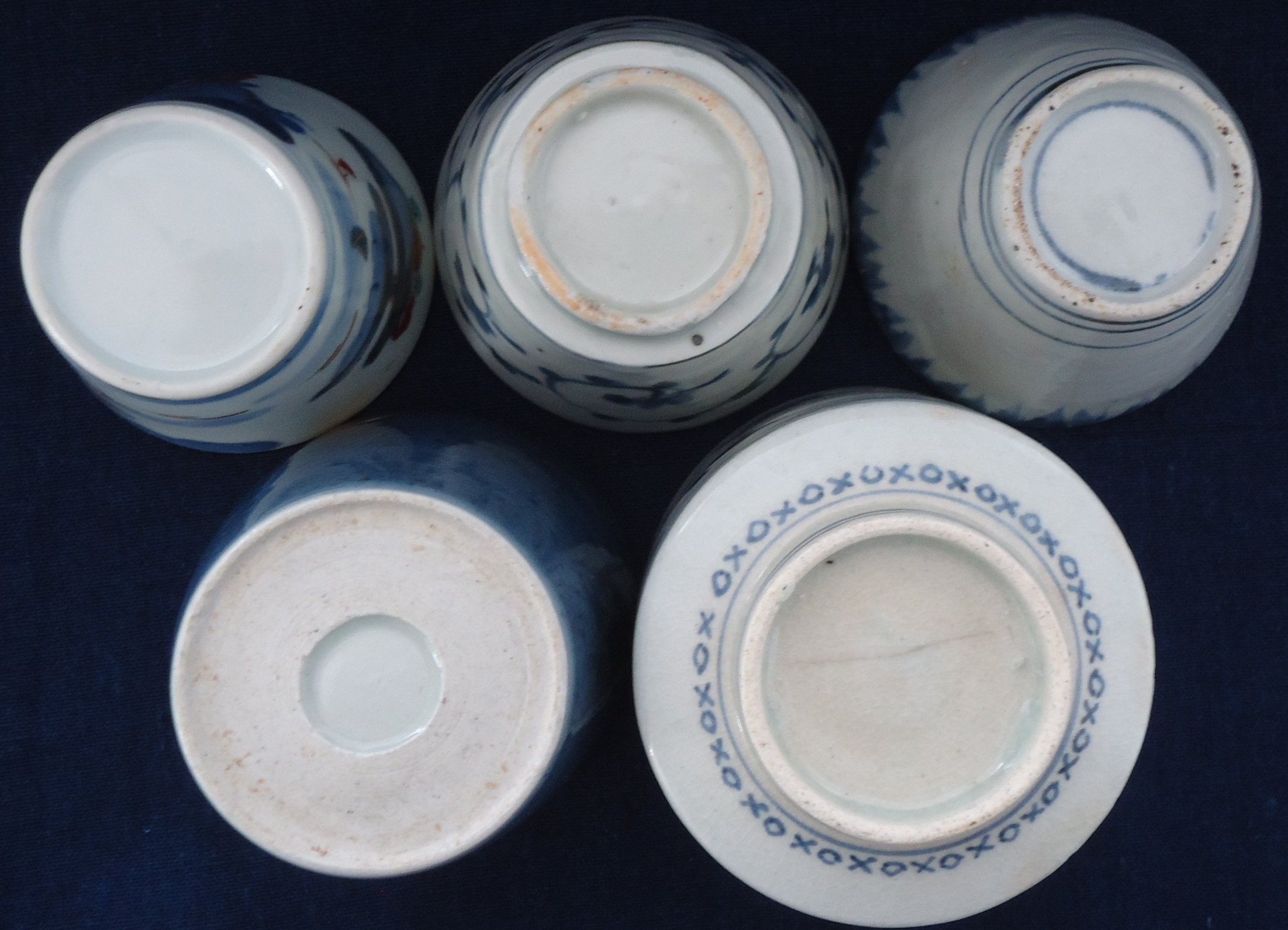
Varieties of base designs across 150 years of production (1620–1868)

Shoki period kodai, in the earlier stages, were unrefined and robust. The actual edge or rim was thick and formed a clear base either raised or flat. As time progressed, the base design became thinner and less weighty. Chuki period bases were characterised by simple, clean white bases, refined with occasional kiln marking stamps—pictogram ('mikomi-moyo'). In the Koki period, the base featured a clear eye-like centre.

== Colours ==
Four main colours were featured on Edo-era Imari soba choko. The glazing techniques used on a white porcelain based clay body included:

- white
- white with a blue underglaze
- siege (celadon)
- blue wash with/without gold outline/pattern
- polychrome – multi-coloured glazes.
