= Anopinella ophiodes =

Scientific classification
- Domain: Eukaryota
- Kingdom: Animalia
- Phylum: Arthropoda
- Class: Insecta
- Order: Lepidoptera
- Family: Tortricidae
- Genus: Anopinella
- Species: A. ophiodes

Binomial name
- Anopinella ophiodes (Walsingham, 1914)

Synonyms
- Tortrix ophiodes Walsingham, 1914

Species of moth

Anopinella ophiodes is a species of moth of the family Tortricidae. It is found in Guatemala.

The length of the forewings is about 6.1 mm. The forewings are brownish, crossed by a rosy vinous line. The hindwings are rosy grey.
