= Anopinella choko =

Scientific classification
- Kingdom: Animalia
- Phylum: Arthropoda
- Clade: Pancrustacea
- Class: Insecta
- Order: Lepidoptera
- Family: Tortricidae
- Genus: Anopinella
- Species: A. choko

Binomial name
- Anopinella choko Brown & Adamski, 2003

Species of moth

Anopinella choko is a species of moth of the family Tortricidae. Formally described by John W. Brown and David Adamski in 2003, it is named after the department in which it was found. It is endemic to Colombia, where it is known only from its type locality of Condoto in the department of Chocó. Adults of the species have a forewing length of 7.7 mm (0.30 in).

== Taxonomy ==
The type specimen of Anopinella choko, an adult male, was collected from Condoto in the department of Chocó in Colombia in 1914 and deposited in the British Museum (Natural History); however, it was only recognized as a novel species much later. Anopinella choko was formally described in 2003 by John W. Brown and David Adamski based on the aforementioned specimen. It is named after the province in which it was discovered. It is part of the fana species group within the genus Anopinella and seems to be most similar to A. cuzco. It is even possible that these two species may be better treated as a single species, but they continue to be separated based on differences in the morphology of their male genitalia and their widely separated distributions.

== Description ==
The only known specimen of Anopinella choko has a forewing length of 7.7 mm (0.30 in). The frons and clypeus are light brown in color, while base of the antennae are a combination of light and reddish brown. The hindwing is plain brown. The tegula and mesonotum of the thorax are a combination of light and plain brown.

== Distribution ==
Anopinella choko is endemic to Colombia, where it is known only from its type locality of Condoto in Chocó.
