= Acorn moth =

Acorn moth can refer to either of two small moths whose caterpillar larvae feed on acorns:

- Blastobasis glandulella, a Blastobasidae moth from North America
- Cydia splendana (chestnut tortrix), a tortrix moth from Europe
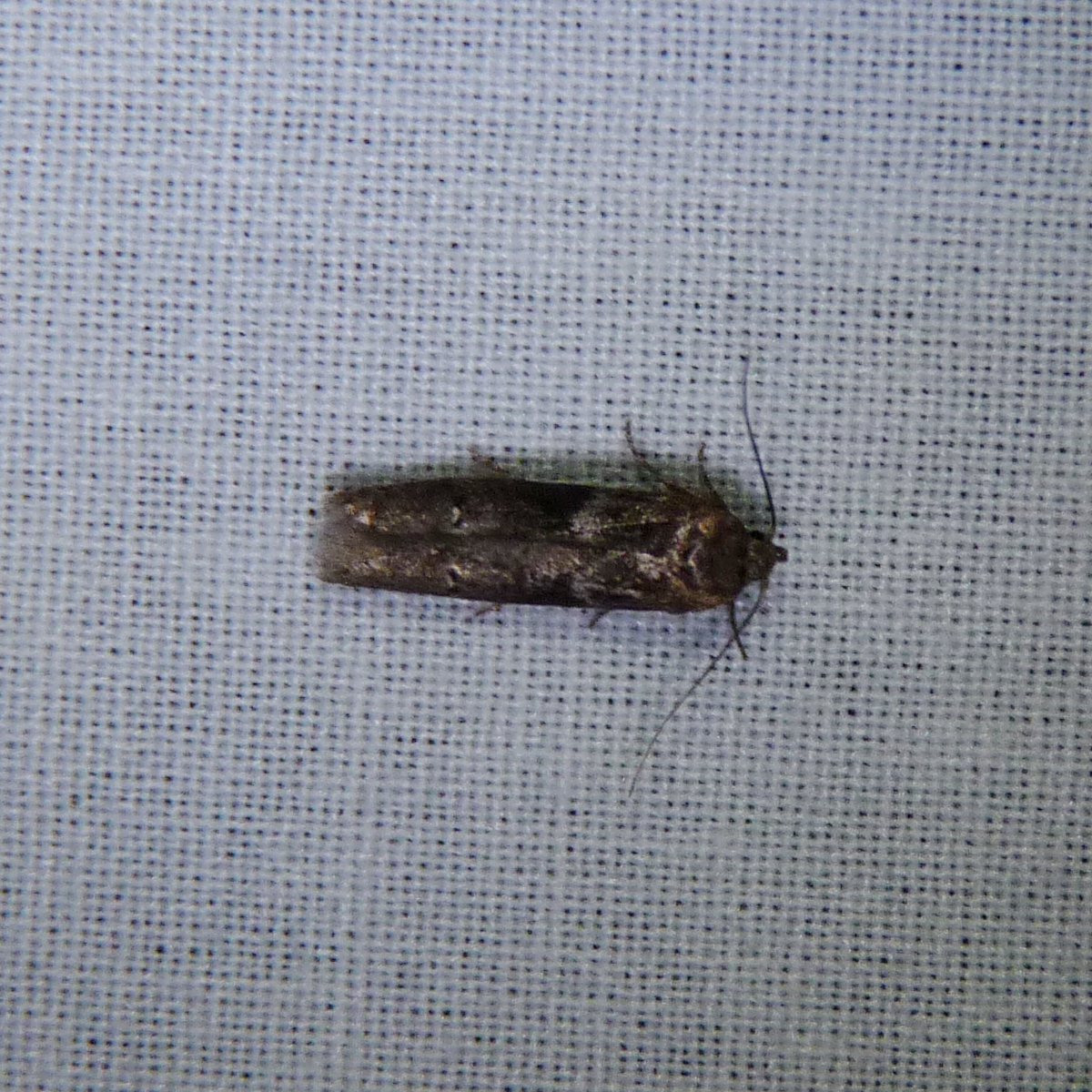
B. glandulella

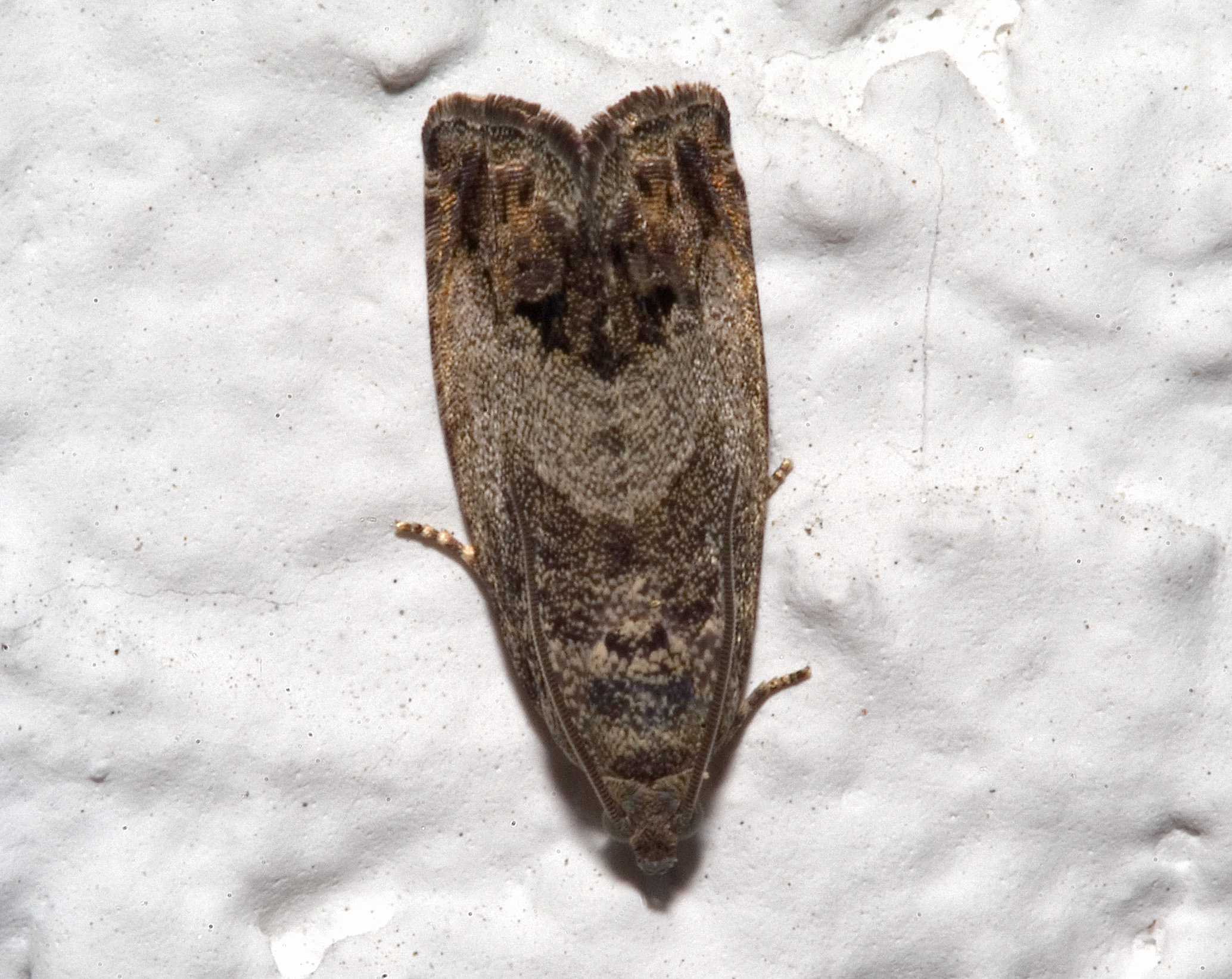
C. splendana
