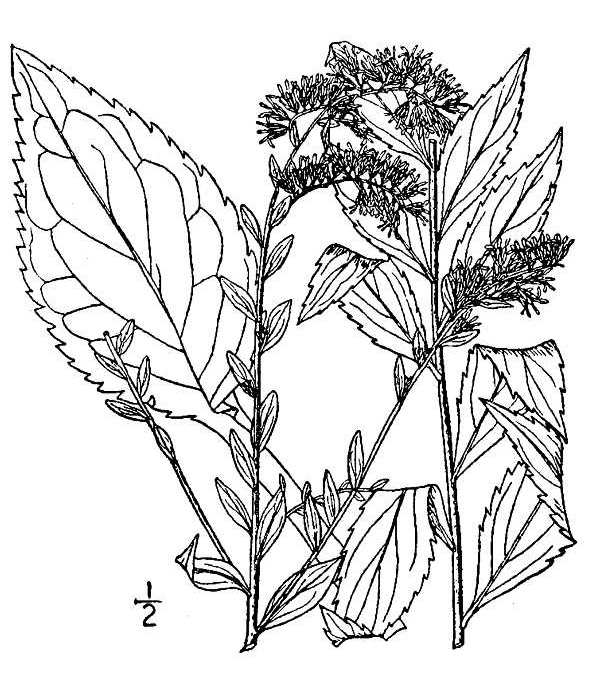

Scientific classification
- Kingdom: Plantae
- Clade: Tracheophytes
- Clade: Angiosperms
- Clade: Eudicots
- Clade: Asterids
- Order: Asterales
- Family: Asteraceae
- Genus: Solidago
- Species: S. ulmifolia

Binomial name
- Solidago ulmifolia Muhl. ex Willd. 1803

Synonyms
- Aster ulmifolius (Muhl. ex Willd.) Kuntze

= Solidago ulmifolia =

Species of plant

Solidago ulmifolia, commonly known as elmleaf goldenrod, is a North American species of goldenrod in the family Asteraceae. It is found in Canada (Ontario and Nova Scotia) and the eastern and central United States (from Maine west to Minnesota, south as far as Texas and the Florida Panhandle).

Its natural habitat is thin woodlands and bluffs, often over calcareous substrates. In Florida, it is found in moist hammock communities. This species is found in both high quality and degraded habitats, such as the shaded edges of lawns and old fields.

== Description ==
Solidago ulmifolia is a perennial herb up to 120 cm (4 feet) tall, with a woody underground caudex. One plant can produce as many as 150 small yellow flower heads in a large, open, branching array at the top of the plant. Flowering occurs in late summer and fall.

=== Galls ===
This species is host to the following insect induced galls:

- Epiblema scudderiana (Clemens, 1860)
- Eurosta solidaginis (Fitch, 1855)
- Gnorimoschema gallaesolidaginis (Fitch, 1855)
- Gnorimoschema salinaris Busck, 1911
- Calycomyza solidaginis Kaltenbach, 1869

external link to gallformers

== Taxonomy ==
Two varieties of Solidago ulmifolia are currently recognized. They are:

- Solidago ulmifolia var. palmeri - with pubescent stems; primarily of the Ozarks of Arkansas and Missouri, disjunct in Mississippi.
- Solidago ulmifolia var. ulmifolia - with glabrous stems; widespread in eastern North America.
