= Gnorimoschema ericoidesi =

Scientific classification
- Kingdom: Animalia
- Phylum: Arthropoda
- Clade: Pancrustacea
- Class: Insecta
- Order: Lepidoptera
- Family: Gelechiidae
- Genus: Gnorimoschema
- Species: G. ericoidesi

Binomial name
- Gnorimoschema ericoidesi Powell & Povolný, 2001

Species of moth

Gnorimoschema ericoidesi is a moth in the family Gelechiidae. It was described by Powell and Povolný in 2001. It is found in North America, where it has been recorded from California.

The larvae possibly feed on Ericameria ericoides.
