= Dichomeris leuconotella =

Scientific classification
- Kingdom: Animalia
- Phylum: Arthropoda
- Class: Insecta
- Order: Lepidoptera
- Family: Gelechiidae
- Genus: Dichomeris
- Species: D. leuconotella

Binomial name
- Dichomeris leuconotella (Busck, 1904)

Synonyms
- Trichotaphe leuconotella Busck, 1904

Species of moth

Dichomeris leuconotella is a moth in the family Gelechiidae. It was described by August Busck in 1904. It is found in North America, where it has been recorded from Nova Scotia to Maryland, southern Canada, Washington, Colorado, Iowa and Indiana. The habitat consists of open fields.

The wingspan is about 17 mm. The forewings are dark purplish brown and shining. At the end of the cell is a conspicuous canary yellow, somewhat elongated, spot, and at apical third is a hardly visible triangular light-brown costal spot. The hindwings are dark fuscous. Adults are on wing from June to September.

The larvae feed on Solidago uliginosa, Helianthus grosseserratus and Aster species.
