= Aristotelia argentifera =

Scientific classification
- Kingdom: Animalia
- Phylum: Arthropoda
- Clade: Pancrustacea
- Class: Insecta
- Order: Lepidoptera
- Family: Gelechiidae
- Genus: Aristotelia
- Species: A. argentifera

Binomial name
- Aristotelia argentifera Busck, 1903

Species of moth

Aristotelia argentifera is a moth of the family Gelechiidae. It was described by August Busck in 1903. It is found in North America, where it has been recorded from California and western Nevada.

The wingspan is 10.5-11.5 mm. The forewings are clear, deep brown, overlaid on the costal half with dark, blackish brown. From near base of the costa is an outwardly directed oblique white fascia, reaching nearly to the dorsal margin, and edged and continued by strongly metallic silvery and bluish iridescent scales. At the middle of the wing is a costal white dash, continued downward and slightly inward nearly to the dorsal edge by a fascia of metallic scales. At the beginning of the costal cilia is a similar larger white dash, continued obliquely inward and downward by a line of metallic scales. Between the first and the second fascia is an additional smaller white costal spot, edged by metallic scales, and at the extreme apex is an ill-defined small group of white scales. From the very base of the wing outward and downward is a thin line of iridescent and silvery white scales, and single iridescent scales are found irregularly and sparsely in the other part of the wing. The hindwings are light silvery fuscous.

The larvae feed on Ericameria ericoides and Baccharis pilularis.
