= Gnorimoschema ericameriae =

Scientific classification
- Kingdom: Animalia
- Phylum: Arthropoda
- Clade: Pancrustacea
- Class: Insecta
- Order: Lepidoptera
- Family: Gelechiidae
- Genus: Gnorimoschema
- Species: G. ericameriae

Binomial name
- Gnorimoschema ericameriae Keifer, 1933

Species of moth

Gnorimoschema ericameriae is a moth in the family Gelechiidae. It was described by Keifer in 1933. It is found in North America, where it has been recorded from California.

The wingspan is 11–15 mm. There are greyish-white or whitish scales on the forewings. The forewings are crossed by a blackish shade just before the tip and the dorsal area is lighter. There is sparse pinkish irroration throughout the wing on lighter areas and a dark shade of dark grey and brown crossing the wing near base. Touching this and at the costal one-fifth, a diagonal light fascia runs to the fold and fuses with the dorsal area at a conspicuous pink spot at one-third. This fascia is bordered outwardly by a dark grey shade which runs to the center of the wing and is from there roughly continued as a jagged dark central line (interrupted by stigmata) to within the apex. Above this central line a curved light streak runs down from the costa at one-third and returns at the costal cilia, enclosing a dark grey area, the center of which is just beyond one-half. Within the apical margin, a grey streak fuses with the central line. The plical stigma is an obscure black spot with some brown scales at about one-third and the first and second discals are black spots in a curved light streak surrounded by brown scales at just beyond one-third and one-half. There are some black dots around the apex. The hindwings are grey with slight pinkish reflections.

The larvae feed on Ericameria ericoides, living in a small rather round, apically pointed, terminal gall. The larvae have a sordid creamy-white body with pinkish fuscous above and with a dull brownish head.
