= Gnorimoschema crypticum =

Scientific classification
- Kingdom: Animalia
- Phylum: Arthropoda
- Clade: Pancrustacea
- Class: Insecta
- Order: Lepidoptera
- Family: Gelechiidae
- Genus: Gnorimoschema
- Species: G. crypticum

Binomial name
- Gnorimoschema crypticum Powell & Povolný, 2001

Species of moth

Gnorimoschema crypticum is a moth in the family Gelechiidae. It was described by Powell and Povolný in 2001. It is found in North America, where it has been recorded from California and Wyoming.

The length of the forewings is 6.2-7.75 mm for males and 5.4-7.75 mm for females.

The larvae feed on Haplopappus squarrosa, Haplopappus menziesii var. vernonioides and Haplopappus acradenia. They create soft galls which vary in form. Pupation takes place in cocoons made in ground litter or in the soil.
