= Gnorimoschema minor =

Scientific classification
- Kingdom: Animalia
- Phylum: Arthropoda
- Clade: Pancrustacea
- Class: Insecta
- Order: Lepidoptera
- Family: Gelechiidae
- Genus: Gnorimoschema
- Species: G. minor

Binomial name
- Gnorimoschema minor (Busck, 1906)

Synonyms
- Phthorimaea minor Busck, 1906

Species of moth

Gnorimoschema minor is a moth in the family Gelechiidae. It was described by August Busck in 1906. It is found in North America, where it has been recorded from Texas.

The wingspan is about 7 mm. The forewings are light ochreous, evenly overlaid with dark brown scales and with thin indistinct ochreous longitudinal streaks. The hindwings are dark fuscous.
