= Gnorimoschema intermedium =

Scientific classification
- Kingdom: Animalia
- Phylum: Arthropoda
- Clade: Pancrustacea
- Class: Insecta
- Order: Lepidoptera
- Family: Gelechiidae
- Genus: Gnorimoschema
- Species: G. intermedium

Binomial name
- Gnorimoschema intermedium Povolný, 2003

Species of moth

Gnorimoschema intermedium is a moth in the family Gelechiidae. It was described by Povolný in 2003. It is found in North America, where it has been recorded from Arizona, Alberta, Saskatchewan and Yukon.
