= Gnorimoschema klotsi =

Scientific classification
- Kingdom: Animalia
- Phylum: Arthropoda
- Clade: Pancrustacea
- Class: Insecta
- Order: Lepidoptera
- Family: Gelechiidae
- Genus: Gnorimoschema
- Species: G. klotsi

Binomial name
- Gnorimoschema klotsi Povolný, 1967

Synonyms
- Gnorimoschema (Neoschema) klotsi Povolný, 1967; Neoschema klotsi

Species of moth

Gnorimoschema klotsi is a moth in the family Gelechiidae. It was described by Povolný in 1967. It is found widespread throughout North America, where it has been recorded from Nevada and California.
