= Gnorimoschema washingtoniella =

Scientific classification
- Kingdom: Animalia
- Phylum: Arthropoda
- Clade: Pancrustacea
- Class: Insecta
- Order: Lepidoptera
- Family: Gelechiidae
- Genus: Gnorimoschema
- Species: G. washingtoniella

Binomial name
- Gnorimoschema washingtoniella Busck, 1904

Species of moth

Gnorimoschema washingtoniella is a moth in the family Gelechiidae. It was described by August Busck in 1904. It is found in North America, where it has been recorded from Washington state.

The wingspan is about 10 mm. The forewings are ochreous white, finely mottled with black, each scale being slightly tipped with black. At the base is an unmottled fawn-colored spot, followed by a nearly pure white narrow oblique line, followed by an obliquely placed large unmottled fawn-colored spot in the middle of the wing, which nearly reaches the costal edge at the basal third, and gradually shades into the ground colour toward the costal edge further out. At apical third is a large triangular ill-defined fawn-colored costal spot, and the tip of the wing is freely suffused with the same colour. The hindwings are light fuscous.
