= Gnorimoschema aterrimum =

Scientific classification
- Kingdom: Animalia
- Phylum: Arthropoda
- Clade: Pancrustacea
- Class: Insecta
- Order: Lepidoptera
- Family: Gelechiidae
- Genus: Gnorimoschema
- Species: G. aterrimum

Binomial name
- Gnorimoschema aterrimum Powell & Povolný, 2001

Species of moth

Gnorimoschema aterrimum is a moth in the family Gelechiidae. It was described by Powell and Povolný in 2001. It is found in North America, where it has been recorded from California.

The length of the forewings is about 5.1 mm.

The larvae feed on Solidago canadensis. They mine the leaves, creating a full-depth blotch mine.
