= Gnorimoschema marmorella =

Scientific classification
- Kingdom: Animalia
- Phylum: Arthropoda
- Clade: Pancrustacea
- Class: Insecta
- Order: Lepidoptera
- Family: Gelechiidae
- Genus: Gnorimoschema
- Species: G. marmorella

Binomial name
- Gnorimoschema marmorella (Chambers, 1875)

Synonyms
- Gelechia marmorella Chambers, 1875; Phthorimaea emancipata Meyrick, 1925

Species of moth

Gnorimoschema marmorella is a moth in the family Gelechiidae. It was described by Vactor Tousey Chambers in 1875. It is found in North America, where it has been recorded from Kentucky.

Adults are pale gray marbled irregularly with dark brown, with no salient markings.
