= Gnorimoschema stigmaticum =

Scientific classification
- Kingdom: Animalia
- Phylum: Arthropoda
- Clade: Pancrustacea
- Class: Insecta
- Order: Lepidoptera
- Family: Gelechiidae
- Genus: Gnorimoschema
- Species: G. stigmaticum

Binomial name
- Gnorimoschema stigmaticum Powell & Povolný, 2001

Species of moth

Gnorimoschema stigmaticum is a moth in the family Gelechiidae. It was described by Powell and Povolný in 2001. It is found in North America, where it has been recorded from California.
