= Gnorimoschema sporomochla =

Scientific classification
- Kingdom: Animalia
- Phylum: Arthropoda
- Clade: Pancrustacea
- Class: Insecta
- Order: Lepidoptera
- Family: Gelechiidae
- Genus: Gnorimoschema
- Species: G. sporomochla

Binomial name
- Gnorimoschema sporomochla Meyrick, 1929

Species of moth

Gnorimoschema sporomochla is a moth in the family Gelechiidae. It was described by Edward Meyrick in 1929. It is found in North America, where it has been recorded from Texas.

The wingspan is about 12 mm.
