= Gnorimoschema banksiella =

Scientific classification
- Kingdom: Animalia
- Phylum: Arthropoda
- Clade: Pancrustacea
- Class: Insecta
- Order: Lepidoptera
- Family: Gelechiidae
- Genus: Gnorimoschema
- Species: G. banksiella

Binomial name
- Gnorimoschema banksiella Busck, 1903

Species of moth

Gnorimoschema banksiella is a moth in the family Gelechiidae. It was described by August Busck in 1903. It is found in North America, where it has been recorded from New York, Pennsylvania, Massachusetts, Maine, Ontario and Quebec.

The wingspan is 12–13 mm. The forewings are dull dark fuscous (nearly black) with two round ochreous brown spots, one on middle of the cell and one at the end of the cell. Below, on the fold is a similarly colored diffused oblong spot touching the first discal spot and reaching down to the dorsal edge. The hindwings are light fuscous.
