= Gnorimoschema slabaughi =

Scientific classification
- Kingdom: Animalia
- Phylum: Arthropoda
- Clade: Pancrustacea
- Class: Insecta
- Order: Lepidoptera
- Family: Gelechiidae
- Genus: Gnorimoschema
- Species: G. slabaughi

Binomial name
- Gnorimoschema slabaughi Miller, 2000

Species of moth

Gnorimoschema slabaughi is a moth in the family Gelechiidae. It was described by William E. Miller in 2000. It is found in North America, where it has been recorded from North Dakota.

The larvae feed on Grindelia squarrosa.
