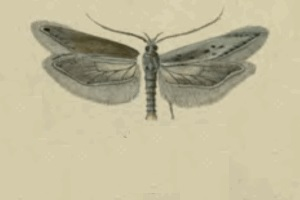

Scientific classification
- Kingdom: Animalia
- Phylum: Arthropoda
- Clade: Pancrustacea
- Class: Insecta
- Order: Lepidoptera
- Family: Gelechiidae
- Genus: Gnorimoschema
- Species: G. herbichii

Binomial name
- Gnorimoschema herbichii (Nowicki, 1864)

Synonyms
- Gelechia herbichii Nowicki, 1864; Lita pusillella Rebel, 1893; Gelechia (Lita) tengstroemiella de Joannis, 1910; Lita pazsiczkyi Rebel, 1913; Lita parentesella Toll, 1936; Phthorimaea tengstroemi Hackman, 1946; Gnorimoschema herbichi mongoliae Povolný, 1973; Gnorimoschema herbichi kamchaticum Povolný, 1977

= Gnorimoschema herbichii =

Species of moth

Gnorimoschema herbichii is a moth in the family Gelechiidae. It was described by Nowicki in 1864. It is found in Portugal, Spain, France, the Netherlands, Germany, Denmark, Poland, Hungary, Romania, North Macedonia, the Baltic region, Norway, Finland, Ukraine and Russia. In the east, the range extends to Transbaikalia, Mongolia and Kamchatka. It is also found in North America, where it has been recorded from Alberta, Yukon, Manitoba and Ontario.

The wingspan is 14–15 mm.

The larvae feed on Equisetum arvense, Equisetum palustre, Suaeda maritima and Atriplex species.
