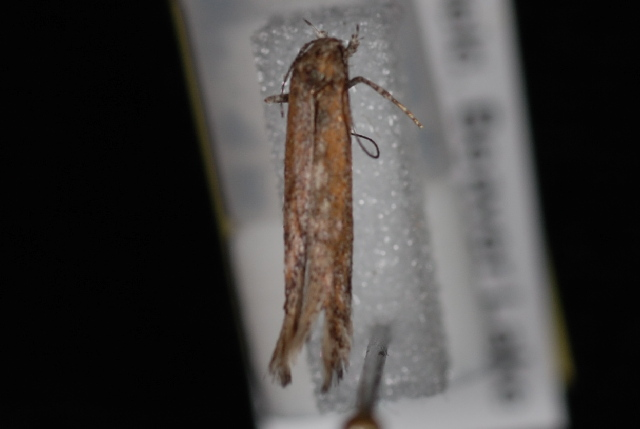

Scientific classification
- Kingdom: Animalia
- Phylum: Arthropoda
- Clade: Pancrustacea
- Class: Insecta
- Order: Lepidoptera
- Family: Gelechiidae
- Genus: Gnorimoschema
- Species: G. albimarginella

Binomial name
- Gnorimoschema albimarginella (Chambers, 1875)

Synonyms
- Gelechia albimarginella Chambers, 1875

= Gnorimoschema albimarginella =

Species of moth

Gnorimoschema albimarginella is a moth in the family Gelechiidae. It was described by Vactor Tousey Chambers in 1875. It is found in North America, where it has been recorded from Colorado.

The dorsal margin of the forewings, from the base to the cilia, is greyish white.
