= Gnorimoschema ambrosiaeella =

Scientific classification
- Kingdom: Animalia
- Phylum: Arthropoda
- Clade: Pancrustacea
- Class: Insecta
- Order: Lepidoptera
- Family: Gelechiidae
- Genus: Gnorimoschema
- Species: G. ambrosiaeella

Binomial name
- Gnorimoschema ambrosiaeella (Chambers, 1875)

Synonyms
- Gelechia ambrosiaeella Chambers, 1875

Species of moth

Gnorimoschema ambrosiaeella is a moth in the family Gelechiidae. It was described by Vactor Tousey Chambers in 1875. It is found in North America, where it has been recorded from Kentucky.

The forewings are white, suffused with ochreous yellow, and marbled with dark brown streaks and spots which are confluent, and especially noticeable about the middle of the costal half of the wing.

The larvae feed inside the seed capsules of Ambrosia trifida.
