= Gnorimoschema debenedictisi =

Scientific classification
- Kingdom: Animalia
- Phylum: Arthropoda
- Clade: Pancrustacea
- Class: Insecta
- Order: Lepidoptera
- Family: Gelechiidae
- Genus: Gnorimoschema
- Species: G. debenedictisi

Binomial name
- Gnorimoschema debenedictisi Powell & Povolný, 2001

Species of moth

Gnorimoschema debenedictisi is a moth in the family Gelechiidae. It was described by Powell and Povolný in 2001. It is found in North America, where it has been recorded from California.

The larvae feed on Erigeron glaucus and Solidago spathulata. They feed on the new spring growth, excavating a full-depth blotch mine in early instars.
