= Gnorimoschema tenerum =

Scientific classification
- Kingdom: Animalia
- Phylum: Arthropoda
- Clade: Pancrustacea
- Class: Insecta
- Order: Lepidoptera
- Family: Gelechiidae
- Genus: Gnorimoschema
- Species: G. tenerum

Binomial name
- Gnorimoschema tenerum Powell & Povolný, 2001

Species of moth

Gnorimoschema tenerum is a moth in the family Gelechiidae. It was described by Powell and Povolný in 2001. It is found in North America, where it has been recorded from California.

The larvae feed on Anaphalis margaritacea, tunneling into the unopened terminal buds.
