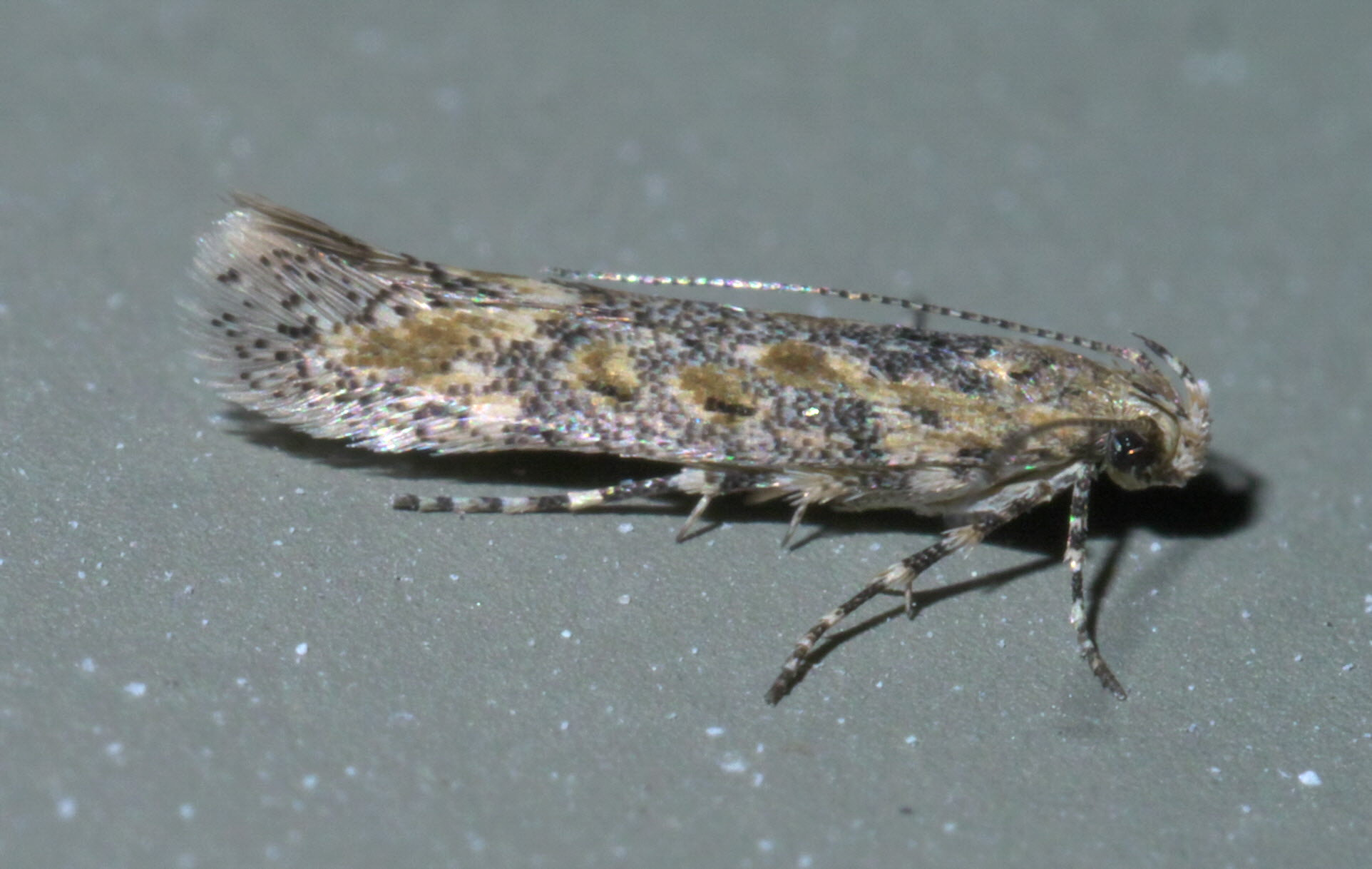

Scientific classification
- Kingdom: Animalia
- Phylum: Arthropoda
- Clade: Pancrustacea
- Class: Insecta
- Order: Lepidoptera
- Family: Gelechiidae
- Genus: Gnorimoschema
- Species: G. triocellella

Binomial name
- Gnorimoschema triocellella (Chambers, 1877)

Synonyms
- Gelechia triocellella Chambers, 1877

= Gnorimoschema triocellella =

Species of moth

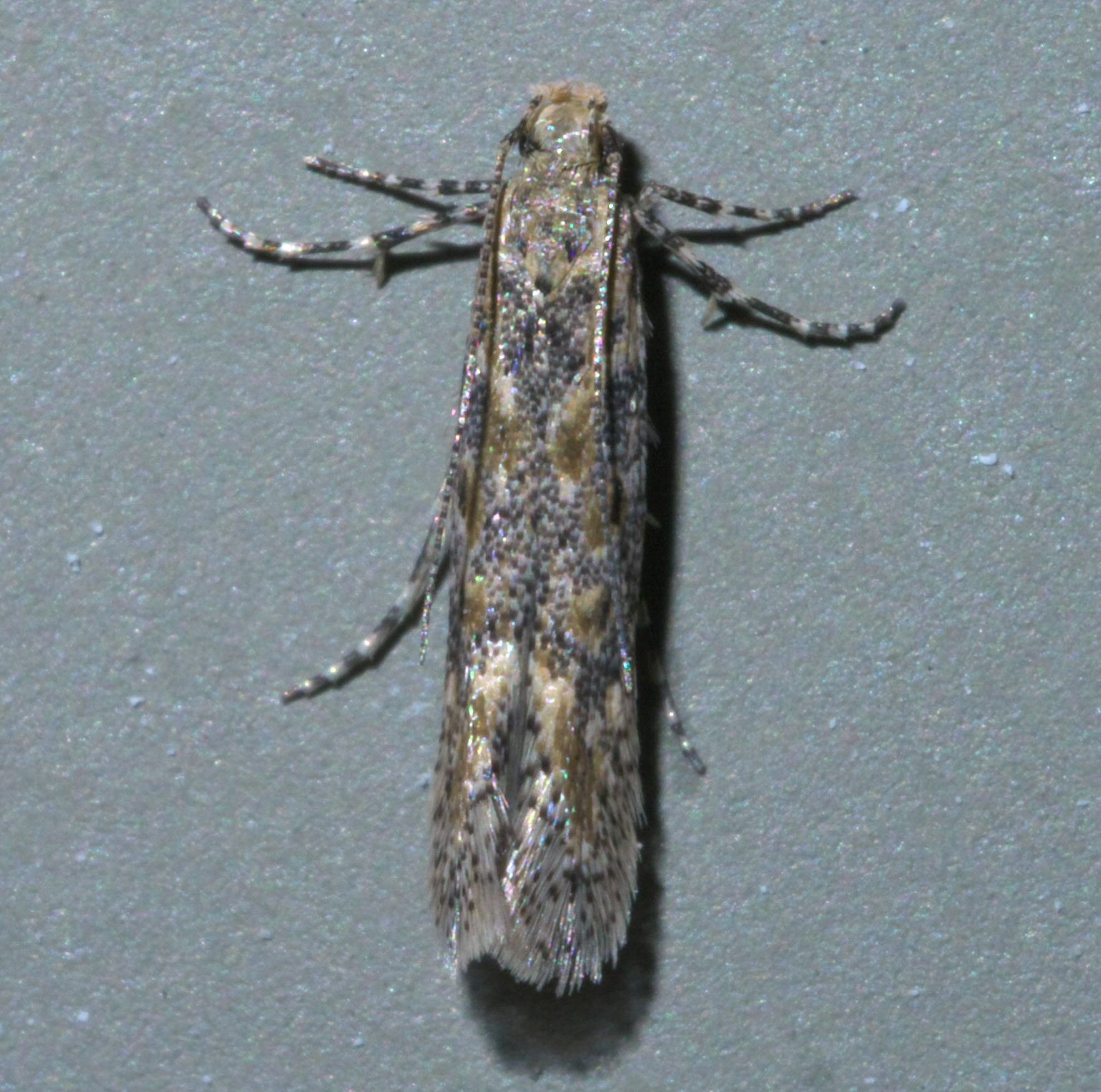
Gnorimoschema triocellella, Hodges #2006, Size: 5.4 mm

Gnorimoschema triocellella is a moth in the family Gelechiidae. It was described by Vactor Tousey Chambers in 1877. It is found in North America, where it has been recorded from Alberta, Colorado, Wyoming, Maine and Kentucky.

The wingspan is about 12 mm. There are three ocellated spots on the forewings, one on the disc, one at the end of the disc, and one on the fold. They are ocherous, with a brown pupil. There is also a small ocherous basal streak near the costal margin. The hindwings are pale grayish, with a slight fuscous tinge.
