= Gnorimoschema florella =

Scientific classification
- Kingdom: Animalia
- Phylum: Arthropoda
- Clade: Pancrustacea
- Class: Insecta
- Order: Lepidoptera
- Family: Gelechiidae
- Genus: Gnorimoschema
- Species: G. florella

Binomial name
- Gnorimoschema florella Busck, 1903

Species of moth

Gnorimoschema florella is a moth in the family Gelechiidae. It was described by August Busck in 1903. It is found in North America, where it has been recorded from Colorado and California.

The wingspan is about 17 mm. The costal half of the forewings whitish is yellow sprinkled with light ochreous-brown scales, while the dorsal half is brick red. At the basal third is a small black costal spot and on middle of the cell is small black dot, below and nearer the base another similar dot on the fold, and at the end of the cell is a third. All of these are surrounded by a circlet of whitish scales. A few black scales are scattered irregularly on the wing, especially in the dorsal part and around the apical edge. The hindwings are shining whitish fuscous.
