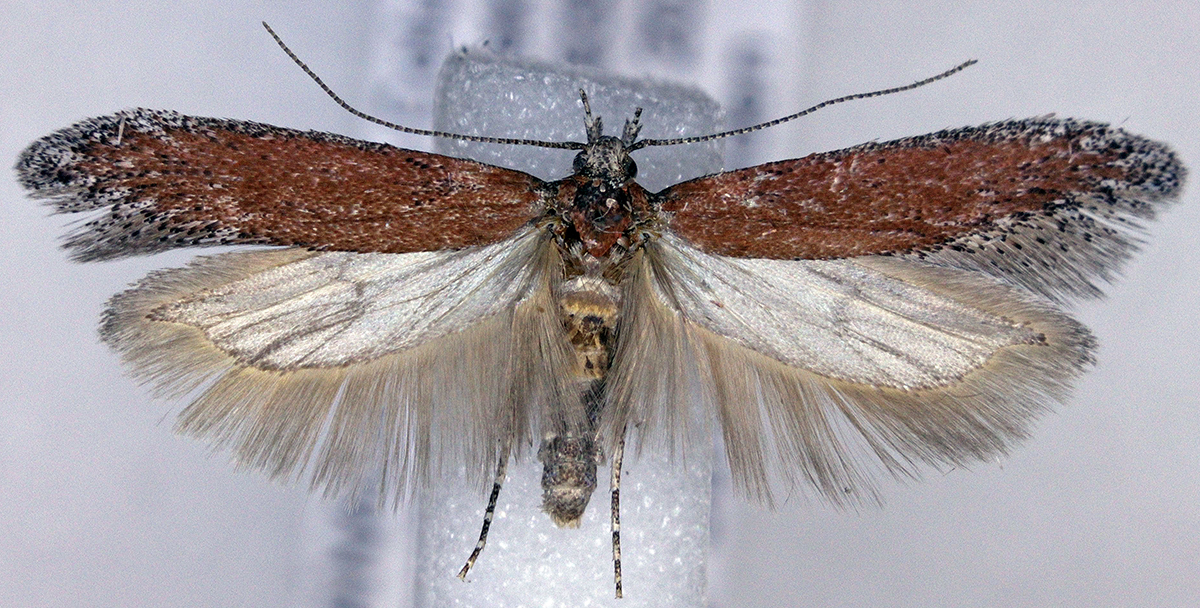

Scientific classification
- Kingdom: Animalia
- Phylum: Arthropoda
- Clade: Pancrustacea
- Class: Insecta
- Order: Lepidoptera
- Family: Gelechiidae
- Genus: Gnorimoschema
- Species: G. pedmontella

Binomial name
- Gnorimoschema pedmontella (Chambers, 1877)

Synonyms
- Gelechia pedmontella Chambers, 1877

= Gnorimoschema pedmontella =

Species of moth

Gnorimoschema pedmontella is a species of moth in the family Gelechiidae. It was first described by Vactor Tousey Chambers in 1877. It is found in North America, where it has been recorded from Colorado and Ontario.

== Description ==
The forewings are red brown or maroon, sparsely dusted with dark brown on the disc, but densely so along the margins, especially in the apical part of the wing, where brown is the prevailing hue and is dusted with white. The hindwings are pale leaden grey.
