= Gnorimoschema grindeliae =

Scientific classification
- Kingdom: Animalia
- Phylum: Arthropoda
- Clade: Pancrustacea
- Class: Insecta
- Order: Lepidoptera
- Family: Gelechiidae
- Genus: Gnorimoschema
- Species: G. grindeliae

Binomial name
- Gnorimoschema grindeliae Powell & Povolný, 2001

Species of moth

Gnorimoschema grindeliae is a moth in the family Gelechiidae. It was described by Powell and Povolný in 2001. It is found in North America, where it has been recorded from California.

The larvae feed on Grindelia hirsutula from within soft stem galls.
