= Gnorimoschema busckiella =

Scientific classification
- Kingdom: Animalia
- Phylum: Arthropoda
- Clade: Pancrustacea
- Class: Insecta
- Order: Lepidoptera
- Family: Gelechiidae
- Genus: Gnorimoschema
- Species: G. busckiella

Binomial name
- Gnorimoschema busckiella Kearfott, 1903

Species of moth

Gnorimoschema busckiella is a moth in the family Gelechiidae. It was described by William D. Kearfott in 1903. It has been recorded from the US states of Maine, New Jersey and Ohio.

The wingspan is 16–19 mm. The forewings are bronze brown, irrorated (sprinkled) with white, the basal half of each scale is white, the outer and overlapping half bronze-brown, the white irrorations are caused by the brown not entirely covering the basal white. This arrangement of scales is uniformly distributed over the wing, except on the costal margin outer quarter and outer margin, where on account of the greater length of the scales, more white is exposed and the colors are almost equal. On the outer margin the same coloration extends halfway out on the cilia. The hindwings are fuscous.

The larvae feed on Aster patens.
