= Gnorimoschema brackenridgiella =

Scientific classification
- Kingdom: Animalia
- Phylum: Arthropoda
- Clade: Pancrustacea
- Class: Insecta
- Order: Lepidoptera
- Family: Gelechiidae
- Genus: Gnorimoschema
- Species: G. brackenridgiella

Binomial name
- Gnorimoschema brackenridgiella (Busck, 1903)

Synonyms
- Gelechia brackenridgiella Busck, 1903; Gelechia detersella Clemens, 1860 (preocc. Zeller, 1847)

Species of moth

Gnorimoschema brackenridgiella is a moth in the family Gelechiidae. It was described by August Busck in 1903. It is found in North America.
