= Gnorimoschema albangulatum =

Scientific classification
- Kingdom: Animalia
- Phylum: Arthropoda
- Clade: Pancrustacea
- Class: Insecta
- Order: Lepidoptera
- Family: Gelechiidae
- Genus: Gnorimoschema
- Species: G. albangulatum

Binomial name
- Gnorimoschema albangulatum Braun, 1926

Species of moth

Gnorimoschema albangulatum is a moth in the family Gelechiidae. It was described by Annette Frances Braun in 1926. It is found in North America, where it has been recorded from Alberta and Manitoba.
