= Gnorimoschema valesiella =

Scientific classification
- Kingdom: Animalia
- Phylum: Arthropoda
- Clade: Pancrustacea
- Class: Insecta
- Order: Lepidoptera
- Family: Gelechiidae
- Genus: Gnorimoschema
- Species: G. valesiella

Binomial name
- Gnorimoschema valesiella (Staudinger, 1877)

Synonyms
- Lita valesiella Staudinger, 1877; Lita diabolicella Hering, 1924; Phthorimaea charcoti Meyrick, 1934; Phthorimaea hackmani Schantz, 1952

Species of moth

Gnorimoschema valesiella is a moth in the family Gelechiidae. It was described by Otto Staudinger in 1877. It is found in Iceland, Spain, France, Austria, Switzerland, Italy, Norway, Sweden, Finland, Latvia, northern Russia, the Caucasus, Transbaikal, Greenland and Yukon.

The wingspan is 13–14 mm.

The larvae feed on Solidago virgaurea and Erigeron acer.
