= Gnorimoschema dudiella =

Scientific classification
- Kingdom: Animalia
- Phylum: Arthropoda
- Clade: Pancrustacea
- Class: Insecta
- Order: Lepidoptera
- Family: Gelechiidae
- Genus: Gnorimoschema
- Species: G. dudiella

Binomial name
- Gnorimoschema dudiella Busck, 1903

Species of moth

Gnorimoschema dudiella is a moth in the family Gelechiidae. It was described by August Busck in 1903. It is found in North America, where it has been recorded from Arizona and Texas.

The wingspan is 15-17.2 mm. The forewings are bluish white, but so thickly overlaid with black and fuscous as to appear dark, each scale being mottled with white and black or dark fuscous. On the basal and apical one-third the light color prevails giving these parts a light pearl-gray appearance. On the middle of the cell is a short deep black perpendicular dash slightly edged with brown scales and at the end of the cell is another similar larger oblique velvety-black dash, also edged with light brown. Parallel with the dorsal edge and just within this is a row of three equidistant large tufts of erect scales. The hindwings are dark fuscous.
