= Gnorimoschema coquillettella =

Scientific classification
- Kingdom: Animalia
- Phylum: Arthropoda
- Clade: Pancrustacea
- Class: Insecta
- Order: Lepidoptera
- Family: Gelechiidae
- Genus: Gnorimoschema
- Species: G. coquillettella

Binomial name
- Gnorimoschema coquillettella Busck, 1902

Species of moth

Gnorimoschema coquillettella is a moth in the family Gelechiidae. It was described by August Busck in 1902. It is found in North America, where it has been recorded from California and Colorado.

The wingspan is 11.5–14 mm. The basal fifth of the forewings is light yellowish brown, with this color continued outward and downward in a tapering curved streak along the dorsal edge to beyond the middle of the wing. The ground color in the rest of the wing is pale bluish white with each scale tipped with black. Adjoining the basal fawn-colored area is a semi-circular costal region, heavily overlaid with dark fuscous, and outside this is another similar costal dark area not so well defined. In the first of these dark semicircles, on the middle of the cell, is a dark reddish-brown dot, surrounded by a few fawn-colored scales, and below the second costal semicircle, at the end of the cell, is another similarly edged spot. A few dark fuscous scales are sprinkled irregularly over the apical part of the wing, and the extreme apex is dark fuscous. The hindwings are silvery fuscous, darkest along the costa and toward the tip.

The larvae feed on Ericameria pinifolia, forming false galls on the terminal twigs.
