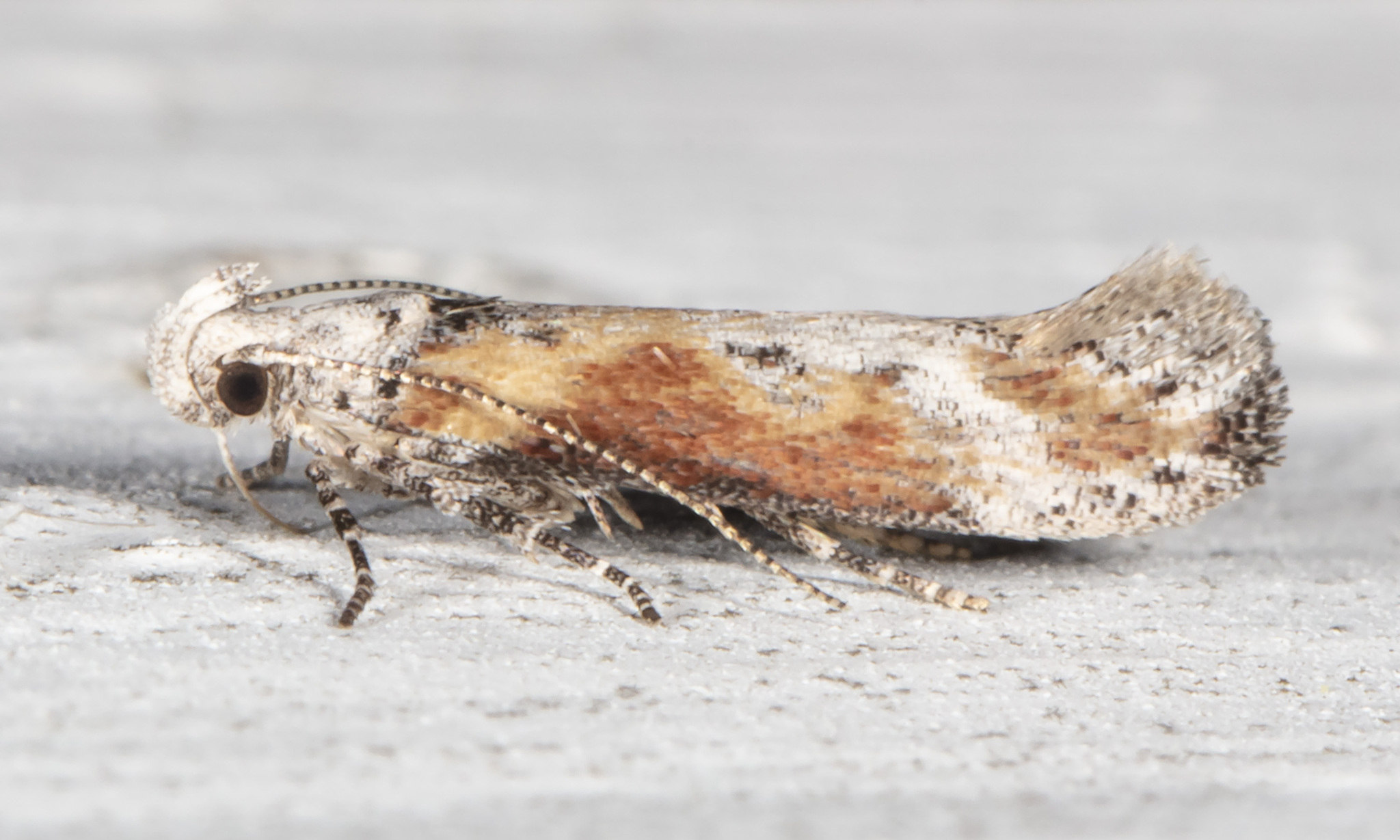

Scientific classification
- Kingdom: Animalia
- Phylum: Arthropoda
- Clade: Pancrustacea
- Class: Insecta
- Order: Lepidoptera
- Family: Gelechiidae
- Genus: Gnorimoschema
- Species: G. septentrionella

Binomial name
- Gnorimoschema septentrionella Fyles, 1911

= Gnorimoschema septentrionella =

Species of moth

Gnorimoschema septentrionella is a species of moth in the family Gelechiidae. It was first described by Fyles in 1911. It is found in North America, where it has been recorded from Alberta, British Columbia, Maine, Michigan, Minnesota, Quebec and Saskatchewan.

The wingspan is about 20 mm.

The larvae feed on Aster junceus. They form a gall on their host plant.
