= Gnorimoschema grisella =

Scientific classification
- Kingdom: Animalia
- Phylum: Arthropoda
- Clade: Pancrustacea
- Class: Insecta
- Order: Lepidoptera
- Family: Gelechiidae
- Genus: Gnorimoschema
- Species: G. grisella

Binomial name
- Gnorimoschema grisella (Chambers, 1872)

Synonyms
- Gelechia grisella Chambers, 1872; Gelechia discomaculella Chambers, 1872; Gelechia aurimaculella Chambers, 1872

Species of moth

Gnorimoschema grisella is a moth in the family Gelechiidae. It was described by Vactor Tousey Chambers in 1872. It is found in North America, where it has been recorded from Kentucky.

Adults are gray, densely dusted with dark brown, and with the base of the costa dark brown. The head is faintly dusted and the antennae are dark brown.
