= Gnorimoschema robustella =

Scientific classification
- Kingdom: Animalia
- Phylum: Arthropoda
- Clade: Pancrustacea
- Class: Insecta
- Order: Lepidoptera
- Family: Gelechiidae
- Genus: Gnorimoschema
- Species: G. robustella

Binomial name
- Gnorimoschema robustella (Staudinger, 1871)

Synonyms
- Gelechia robustella Staudinger, 1871; Gnorimoschema robustellum; Phthorimaea syrphetopa Meyrick, 1926

Species of moth

Gnorimoschema robustella is a moth of the family Gelechiidae. It is found in the south-eastern part of European Russia and western Kazakhstan.

The wingspan is 16–17 mm. The forewings are brownish irregularly mixed fuscous and whitish. The markings are dark fuscous, consisting of two or three suffused spots forming a transverse series near the base, a more or less developed oblique suffused streak from the costa at one-fourth to the fold, small spots representing the stigmata, the plical obliquely before the first discal, preceded and followed by small white spots. There is an irregular zigzag suffused white transverse shade at three-fourths, and cloudy white marginal spots around the posterior part of the costa and termen, the space between these markings mostly suffused dark fuscous. The hindwings are light bluish-grey, rather thinly scaled.
