= Gnorimoschema versicolorella =

Scientific classification
- Kingdom: Animalia
- Phylum: Arthropoda
- Clade: Pancrustacea
- Class: Insecta
- Order: Lepidoptera
- Family: Gelechiidae
- Genus: Gnorimoschema
- Species: G. versicolorella

Binomial name
- Gnorimoschema versicolorella (Chambers, 1872)

Synonyms
- Depressaria versicolorella Chambers, 1872

Species of moth

Gnorimoschema versicolorella is a moth in the family Gelechiidae. It was described by Vactor Tousey Chambers in 1872. It is found in North America, where it has been recorded from Kentucky.

The forewings are ocherous, thickly dusted with dark brown, but a little less thickly in the basal fourth of the wing, with a brown streak across the base of the wing, and a brown streak extending obliquely from the costa about the basal fourth, to the fold, which, however, is scarcely distinguishable from the thickly dusted portion of the wing behind it. The hindwings are pale fuscous.
