= Gnorimoschema powelli =

Scientific classification
- Kingdom: Animalia
- Phylum: Arthropoda
- Clade: Pancrustacea
- Class: Insecta
- Order: Lepidoptera
- Family: Gelechiidae
- Genus: Gnorimoschema
- Species: G. powelli

Binomial name
- Gnorimoschema powelli Povolný, 1998

Species of moth

Gnorimoschema powelli is a moth in the family Gelechiidae. It was described by Povolný in 1998. It is found in North America, where it has been recorded from California and Arizona.

The larvae induce galls on the stems of Baccharis sarothroides.
