= Gnorimoschema nordlandicolella =

Scientific classification
- Kingdom: Animalia
- Phylum: Arthropoda
- Clade: Pancrustacea
- Class: Insecta
- Order: Lepidoptera
- Family: Gelechiidae
- Genus: Gnorimoschema
- Species: G. nordlandicolella

Binomial name
- Gnorimoschema nordlandicolella (Strand, 1902)

Synonyms
- Gelechia (Lita) nordlandicolella Strand, 1902; Phthorimaea cyceonodes Meyrick, 1926; Gnorimoschema eucausta Meyrick, 1929; Phthorimaea fennicella Hackman, 1946

Species of moth

Gnorimoschema nordlandicolella is a moth in the family Gelechiidae. It was described by Strand in 1902. It is found in Norway, Finland, Sweden, Estonia, Russia (Kola Peninsula, Irkutsk), Turkmenistan and Kyrgyzstan, as well as North America, where it has been recorded from Texas, Arizona and Yukon.

The wingspan is about 18 mm. The forewings are light brownish-ochreous irrorated dark grey and whitish, the ground colour sometimes wholly obscured, or the spots of ground colour indicating the stigmata, but without defined markings. The hindwings are bluish-grey.
