= Gnorimoschema alaricella =

Scientific classification
- Kingdom: Animalia
- Phylum: Arthropoda
- Clade: Pancrustacea
- Class: Insecta
- Order: Lepidoptera
- Family: Gelechiidae
- Genus: Gnorimoschema
- Species: G. alaricella

Binomial name
- Gnorimoschema alaricella Busck, 1908

Species of moth

Gnorimoschema alaricella is a moth in the family Gelechiidae. It was described by August Busck in 1908. It is found in North America, where it has been recorded from California, Kentucky, New Hampshire, Ohio and Pennsylvania.

The wingspan is 18–19 mm. The forewings are bluish white, but this ground colour is nearly obscured by a darker scaling of black, dark fuscous and brown, which suffuses the wing without definite pattern, though with the effect of diffused longitudinal streaks. On the middle of the wing is a very indistinct brown ocellate spot, with a black center, and on the fold below it is another similar but less distinct spot. Both of these are easily lost in the general dark scaling. The hindwings are dark fuscous.
