= Gnorimoschema triforceps =

Scientific classification
- Kingdom: Animalia
- Phylum: Arthropoda
- Clade: Pancrustacea
- Class: Insecta
- Order: Lepidoptera
- Family: Gelechiidae
- Genus: Gnorimoschema
- Species: G. triforceps

Binomial name
- Gnorimoschema triforceps Povolný, 2003

Species of moth

Gnorimoschema triforceps is a moth in the family Gelechiidae. It was described by Povolný in 2003. It is found in North America, where it has been recorded from Nevada.
