= Gnorimoschema clavatum =

Scientific classification
- Kingdom: Animalia
- Phylum: Arthropoda
- Clade: Pancrustacea
- Class: Insecta
- Order: Lepidoptera
- Family: Gelechiidae
- Genus: Gnorimoschema
- Species: G. clavatum

Binomial name
- Gnorimoschema clavatum Povolný, 1998

Species of moth

Gnorimoschema clavatum is a moth in the family Gelechiidae. It was described by Povolný in 1998. It is found in North America, where it has been recorded from Saskatchewan.

The length of the forewings is about 5 mm.
