= Gnorimoschema octomaculella =

Scientific classification
- Kingdom: Animalia
- Phylum: Arthropoda
- Clade: Pancrustacea
- Class: Insecta
- Order: Lepidoptera
- Family: Gelechiidae
- Genus: Gnorimoschema
- Species: G. octomaculella

Binomial name
- Gnorimoschema octomaculella (Chambers, 1875)

Synonyms
- Gelechia octomaculella Chambers, 1875

Species of moth

Gnorimoschema octomaculella is a moth in the family Gelechiidae. It was described by Vactor Tousey Chambers in 1875. It is found in North America, where it has been recorded from California and Washington.

The forewings have a brown spot on the dorsal margin near the base, which is brownish, and also a large rust-red spot on the disc before the middle which touches a brown costal spot placed just before it. There is another rusty-red spot at the end of the disc, and a rather dense small patch of dusting before the costal cilia, and one also before the dorsal cilia. The hindwings are pale grayish fuscus.

The larvae feed on Acamptopappus sphaerocephalus.
