= Gnorimoschema ramulata =

Scientific classification
- Kingdom: Animalia
- Phylum: Arthropoda
- Clade: Pancrustacea
- Class: Insecta
- Order: Lepidoptera
- Family: Gelechiidae
- Genus: Gnorimoschema
- Species: G. ramulata

Binomial name
- Gnorimoschema ramulata (Meyrick, 1926)

Synonyms
- Gelechia ramulata Meyrick, 1926

Species of moth

Gnorimoschema ramulata is a moth in the family Gelechiidae. It was described by Edward Meyrick in 1926. It is found in India.
