= Gnorimoschema elbursicum =

Scientific classification
- Kingdom: Animalia
- Phylum: Arthropoda
- Clade: Pancrustacea
- Class: Insecta
- Order: Lepidoptera
- Family: Gelechiidae
- Genus: Gnorimoschema
- Species: G. elbursicum

Binomial name
- Gnorimoschema elbursicum Povolný, 1984

Species of moth

Gnorimoschema elbursicum is a moth in the family Gelechiidae. It was described by Povolný in 1984. It is found in northern Iran.

The length of the forewings is about 3.5. The forewings are ochreous with brownish marks. The hindwings are uniform white.
