= Gnorimoschema huffmanellum =

Scientific classification
- Kingdom: Animalia
- Phylum: Arthropoda
- Clade: Pancrustacea
- Class: Insecta
- Order: Lepidoptera
- Family: Gelechiidae
- Genus: Gnorimoschema
- Species: G. huffmanellum

Binomial name
- Gnorimoschema huffmanellum Metzler & Adamski, 2002

Species of moth

Gnorimoschema huffmanellum is a moth in the family Gelechiidae. It was described by Metzler and Adamski in 2002. It is found in North America, where it has been recorded from Ohio.
