= Gnorimoschema mikkolai =

Scientific classification
- Kingdom: Animalia
- Phylum: Arthropoda
- Clade: Pancrustacea
- Class: Insecta
- Order: Lepidoptera
- Family: Gelechiidae
- Genus: Gnorimoschema
- Species: G. mikkolai

Binomial name
- Gnorimoschema mikkolai Povolný, 1994

Species of moth

Gnorimoschema mikkolai is a moth in the family Gelechiidae. It was described by Povolný in 1994. It is found in Russia, where it has been recorded from the Magadan Oblast in north-eastern Siberia.
