= Gnorimoschema nupponeni =

Scientific classification
- Kingdom: Animalia
- Phylum: Arthropoda
- Clade: Pancrustacea
- Class: Insecta
- Order: Lepidoptera
- Family: Gelechiidae
- Genus: Gnorimoschema
- Species: G. nupponeni

Binomial name
- Gnorimoschema nupponeni Huemer & Karsholt, 2010

Species of moth

Gnorimoschema nupponeni is a moth in the family Gelechiidae. It was described by Peter Huemer and Ole Karsholt in 2010. It is found on the Crimea and in the southern Ural Mountains.
