= Gnorimoschema splendoriferella =

Scientific classification
- Kingdom: Animalia
- Phylum: Arthropoda
- Clade: Pancrustacea
- Class: Insecta
- Order: Lepidoptera
- Family: Gelechiidae
- Genus: Gnorimoschema
- Species: G. splendoriferella

Binomial name
- Gnorimoschema splendoriferella Busck, 1904

Species of moth

Gnorimoschema splendoriferella is a moth in the family Gelechiidae. It was described by August Busck in 1904. It is found in North America, where it has been recorded from the U.S. state of Washington.

The wingspan is about 16 mm. The forewings are shining, intense purplish red with a narrow costal margin and the apical part of the wing mottled with white and bluish black scales. There is a basal subcostal longitudinal streak, and an ill-defined yellow dorsal and costal spot at the beginning of the cilia.
