= Gnorimoschema salinaris =

Scientific classification
- Kingdom: Animalia
- Phylum: Arthropoda
- Clade: Pancrustacea
- Class: Insecta
- Order: Lepidoptera
- Family: Gelechiidae
- Genus: Gnorimoschema
- Species: G. salinaris

Binomial name
- Gnorimoschema salinaris Busck, 1911

Species of moth

Gnorimoschema salinaris is a moth in the family Gelechiidae. It was described by August Busck in 1911. It is found in North America, where it has been recorded from Florida, Illinois, Kentucky, Maine, Massachusetts, Michigan and New York.

The wingspan is 20–24 mm. The coloration and pattern of the forewings are very similar to Gnorimoschema gallaesolidaginis, with the rather sharply defined basal light area extending along the dorsum and spreading out over the apical third of the wing, and with the large costal chocolate-colored area as in this species, but with ill-defined blackish markings on the dorsal edge near base, and with irregular, longitudinal blackish markings in the interior and apical part of the dark costal area, not found in G. gallaesolidaginis. The hindwings are light ochreous-fuscous.

The larvae feed on Solidago sempervirens, forming galls on the stalks.
