= Gnorimoschema terracottella =

Scientific classification
- Kingdom: Animalia
- Phylum: Arthropoda
- Clade: Pancrustacea
- Class: Insecta
- Order: Lepidoptera
- Family: Gelechiidae
- Genus: Gnorimoschema
- Species: G. terracottella

Binomial name
- Gnorimoschema terracottella Busck, 1900

Species of moth

Gnorimoschema terracottella is a moth in the family Gelechiidae. It was described by August Busck in 1900. It is found in North America, where it has been recorded from Florida and Alabama.

The wingspan is about 10 mm. The forewings are reddish brown and the costa white with two lobes of white reaching down to the fold, the first narrow, pointed obliquely outward and the other large and triangular. At the beginning of the cilia is a costal white spot and opposite it a dorsal one. On the fold beyond the middle is a small white dot. The interval between the white lobes and spots, as well as the apical part of wing, is freely dusted with black and purple scales. The hindwings are purplish grey.

The larvae feed on Iva imbricata. They mine the leaves of their host plant. Pupation takes place outside of the mine in a slight web.
