= Gnorimoschema shepherdiae =

Scientific classification
- Kingdom: Animalia
- Phylum: Arthropoda
- Clade: Pancrustacea
- Class: Insecta
- Order: Lepidoptera
- Family: Gelechiidae
- Genus: Gnorimoschema
- Species: G. shepherdiae

Binomial name
- Gnorimoschema shepherdiae Priest, 2014

Species of moth

Gnorimoschema shepherdiae is a moth in the family Gelechiidae. It was described by Ronald J. Priest in 2014. It is found in North America, where it has been recorded from Alberta, British Columbia, Manitoba, Michigan, Quebec and Yukon.

The length of the forewings is 5–6.3 millimetres (0.20–0.25 in).

The larvae feed on Shepherdia canadensis. They mine the leaves of their host plant.
