= Gnorimoschema semicyclionella =

Scientific classification
- Kingdom: Animalia
- Phylum: Arthropoda
- Clade: Pancrustacea
- Class: Insecta
- Order: Lepidoptera
- Family: Gelechiidae
- Genus: Gnorimoschema
- Species: G. semicyclionella

Binomial name
- Gnorimoschema semicyclionella Busck, 1903

Species of moth

Gnorimoschema semicyclionella is a moth in the family Gelechiidae. It was described by August Busck in 1903. It is found in North America, where it has been recorded from Colorado, Oregon, Wyoming and New Mexico.

The wingspan is 12–14 mm. The forewings are white with a faint reddish tint, thickly sprinkled with minute bluish black atoms, each scale being tipped with black. Near the base of the wing is a clear, light chocolate brown patch and before the middle of the wing is a large chocolate brown semicircular costal spot, reaching down over the fold and edged with lighter brown and white below and with pure white toward the brown basal area. Following and adjoining this costal spot is another smaller and less well-defined semicircular brown costal spot, and toward the tip in the middle of the wing is an obscure brown patch. The hindwings are light silvery grey, darker along the costa and toward the tip.
