= Gnorimoschema lipatiella =

Scientific classification
- Kingdom: Animalia
- Phylum: Arthropoda
- Clade: Pancrustacea
- Class: Insecta
- Order: Lepidoptera
- Family: Gelechiidae
- Genus: Gnorimoschema
- Species: G. lipatiella

Binomial name
- Gnorimoschema lipatiella (Busck, 1909)

Synonyms
- Gelechia lipatiella Busck, 1909

Species of moth

Gnorimoschema lipatiella is a moth in the family Gelechiidae. It was described by August Busck in 1909. It is found in North America, where it has been recorded from Colorado.

The wingspan is 12–13 mm. The forewings are blackish brown with white markings and with the basal and dorsal parts lighter brown with a strong coppery sheen. At the basal fourth is an outwardly oblique, white costal streak, which reaches beyond the fold, but not to the dorsal edge and at the apical third of the costa is an inwardly oblique white fascia of the same angle as, but in opposite direction from the first costal streak. Between these two white streaks is a nearly round, but not sharply defined, white spot just within the costal margin and on the extreme apex before the cilia are a few white scales.
