= Gnorimoschema milleriella =

Scientific classification
- Kingdom: Animalia
- Phylum: Arthropoda
- Clade: Pancrustacea
- Class: Insecta
- Order: Lepidoptera
- Family: Gelechiidae
- Genus: Gnorimoschema
- Species: G. milleriella

Binomial name
- Gnorimoschema milleriella (Chambers, 1875)

Synonyms
- Gelechia milleriella Chambers, 1875

Species of moth

Gnorimoschema milleriella is a moth in the family Gelechiidae. It was described by Vactor Tousey Chambers in 1875. It is found in North America, where it has been recorded from Texas.

Adults are very pale grayish ocherous, almost white, marked with obscure pale yellow spots on the wings, which are also dusted with brown, and marked with minute brown spots. One of these spots is on the extreme costa at the base, and just behind it is another, which is in an oblique line with two others, the last of which is on the fold. Behind this is another small one on the fold, opposite to which, on the costa, is another. There is a large brown costal spot on the costa, just before the cilia, and a small one opposite to it on the dorsal margin, and between these two, are two somewhat diffuse spots. There is a row of dark brown spots around the base of the cilia.
