= Gnorimoschema batanella =

Scientific classification
- Kingdom: Animalia
- Phylum: Arthropoda
- Clade: Pancrustacea
- Class: Insecta
- Order: Lepidoptera
- Family: Gelechiidae
- Genus: Gnorimoschema
- Species: G. batanella

Binomial name
- Gnorimoschema batanella Busck, 1903

Species of moth

Gnorimoschema batanella is a moth in the family Gelechiidae. It was described by August Busck in 1903. It is found in North America, where it has been recorded from California, Illinois, Kentucky, Maine, New Jersey and Ontario.

The wingspan is 11.5-12.5 mm. The forewings are white, with a faint rosy tinge, irregularly and sparsely sprinkled with black scales, especially toward the edges. A rather prominent group of them is found on the costa at the apical third. On the middle of the disc is a small light-brown spot and another similar spot is found at the end of the cell. On the middle of the dorsal edge is a patch of brown, and between this and the apex are two other small groups of brown scales. All of these brown markings are obscure, ill-defined, and not constant in all specimens. The black scales form a nearly continuous thin line at the base of the cilia around the apical edge. The hindwings are dark, shining fuscous.
