= Gnorimoschema siskiouense =

Scientific classification
- Kingdom: Animalia
- Phylum: Arthropoda
- Clade: Pancrustacea
- Class: Insecta
- Order: Lepidoptera
- Family: Gelechiidae
- Genus: Gnorimoschema
- Species: G. siskiouense

Binomial name
- Gnorimoschema siskiouense Povolný, 1985

Species of moth

Gnorimoschema siskiouense is a moth in the family Gelechiidae. It was described by Povolný in 1985. It is found in North America, where it has been recorded from California, Oregon and Utah.
