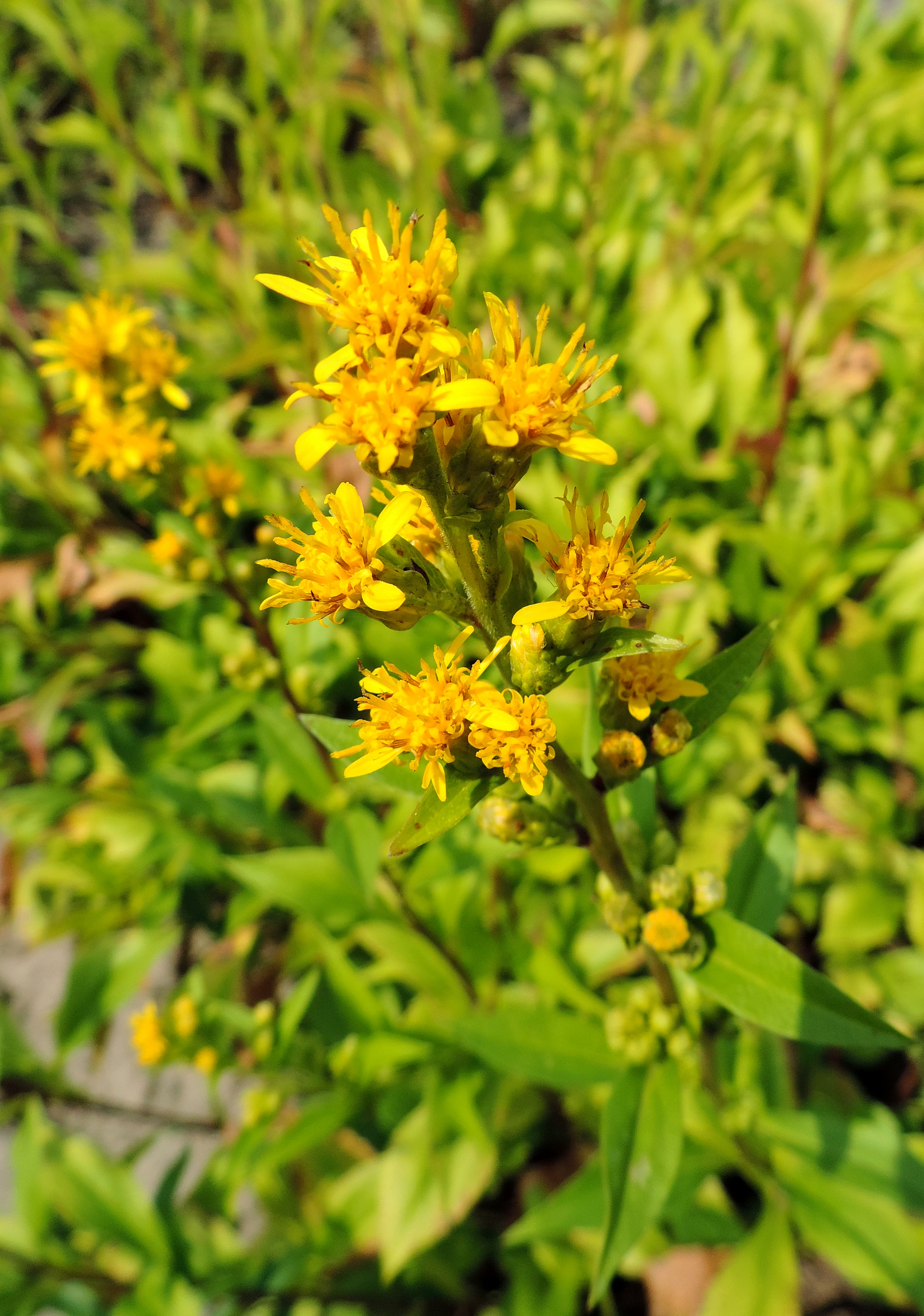

Scientific classification
- Kingdom: Plantae
- Clade: Tracheophytes
- Clade: Angiosperms
- Clade: Eudicots
- Clade: Asterids
- Order: Asterales
- Family: Asteraceae
- Genus: Solidago
- Species: S. uliginosa

Binomial name
- Solidago uliginosa Nutt. 1834

Synonyms
- Synonymy: Aster terrae-novae (Torr. & A.Gray) Kuntze; Aster uliginosus (Nutt.) Kuntze; Aster uliginosus J.M.Wood & M.S.Evans; Aster uniligulatus (DC.) Kuntze; Bigelowia uniligulata DC.; Chrysoma uniligulata (DC.) Nutt.; Felicia uliginosa (J.M.Wood & M.S.Evans) Grau; Solidago chrysolepis Fernald; Solidago farwellii Fernald; Solidago humilis Pursh 1813 not Mill. 1768; Solidago klughii Fernald; Solidago linoides Torr. & A.Gray; Solidago neglecta Torr. & A.Gray; Solidago purshii Porter; Solidago simulans Fernald; Solidago terrae-novae Torr. & A.Gray; Solidago uniligulata (DC.)

= Solidago uliginosa =

Species of flowering plant

Solidago uliginosa, or bog goldenrod, is a North American species of flowering plants in the family Asteraceae. It is found in eastern Canada (from Nunavut to Newfoundland and Manitoba) and the eastern United States (Great Lakes, Northeast, and Appalachian Mountains as far south as northeastern Georgia. There are historical reports of the species growing in Alabama, but these populations appear now to have been extirpated).

Solidago uliginosa is a perennial herb up to 200 cm (80 inches or 6 2/3 feet) tall, spreading by means of underground rhizomes. One plant can produce as many as 230 small yellow flower heads in a narrow, elongate array. The species grows in bogs, marshes, and swamps.

== Galls ==
This species is host to the following insect induced galls:

- Asphondylia monacha Osten Sacken, 1869 (summer generation)
- Gnorimoschema gallaeasterella (Kellicott, 1878)

external link to gallformers
