= Gnorimoschema radkevichi =

Scientific classification
- Kingdom: Animalia
- Phylum: Arthropoda
- Clade: Pancrustacea
- Class: Insecta
- Order: Lepidoptera
- Family: Gelechiidae
- Genus: Gnorimoschema
- Species: G. radkevichi

Binomial name
- Gnorimoschema radkevichi Piskunov, 1980

Species of moth

Gnorimoschema radkevichi is a moth in the family Gelechiidae. It was described by Piskunov in 1980. It is found in Korea and Mongolia.
