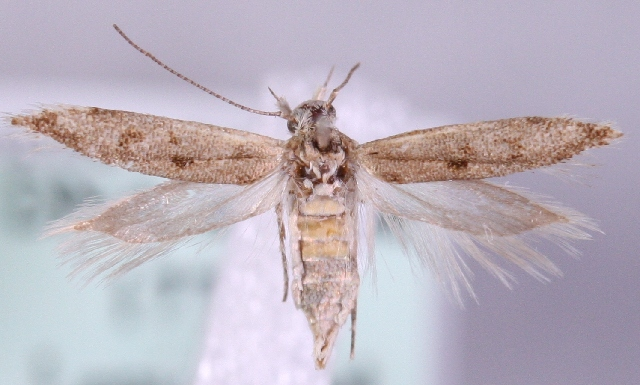

Scientific classification
- Kingdom: Animalia
- Phylum: Arthropoda
- Clade: Pancrustacea
- Class: Insecta
- Order: Lepidoptera
- Family: Gelechiidae
- Genus: Gnorimoschema
- Species: G. bodillum

Binomial name
- Gnorimoschema bodillum Karsholt & Nielsen, 1974

= Gnorimoschema bodillum =

Species of moth

Gnorimoschema bodillum is a moth in the family Gelechiidae. It was described by Ole Karsholt and Ebbe Nielsen in 1974. It is found in Denmark, northern Germany and northern Russia (Taymyrsky Dolgano-Nenetsky District).

The larvae feed on Salix repens and Myrica gale.
