= Gnorimoschema jalavai =

Scientific classification
- Kingdom: Animalia
- Phylum: Arthropoda
- Clade: Pancrustacea
- Class: Insecta
- Order: Lepidoptera
- Family: Gelechiidae
- Genus: Gnorimoschema
- Species: G. jalavai

Binomial name
- Gnorimoschema jalavai Povolný, 1994

Species of moth

Gnorimoschema jalavai is a moth of the family Gelechiidae. It is found in southern Russia (Altai Krai, Tuva, Irkutsk Oblast, Buryatia, Zabaykalsky Krai) and the Chukotka Peninsula in the north-eastern Russian Far East. It was recently reported from Canada (Yukon).
