= Gnorimoschema subterranea =

Scientific classification
- Kingdom: Animalia
- Phylum: Arthropoda
- Clade: Pancrustacea
- Class: Insecta
- Order: Lepidoptera
- Family: Gelechiidae
- Genus: Gnorimoschema
- Species: G. subterranea

Binomial name
- Gnorimoschema subterranea Busck, 1911

Species of moth

Gnorimoschema subterranea is a moth in the family Gelechiidae. It was described by August Busck in 1911. It is found in North America, where it has been recorded from Massachusetts, Colorado, California, Alberta, British Columbia and Ontario.

The length of the forewings is 8.1-10.5 mm for males and 7.3-10.1 mm for females. The forewings are rust to deep ebony brown or even bright brick red. The hindwings are yellowish fuscous.

The larvae feed on Aster multiflorus, Aster ericoides and Aster chilensis, creating stem galls at or beneath ground level.
