= Gnorimoschema compsomorpha =

Scientific classification
- Kingdom: Animalia
- Phylum: Arthropoda
- Clade: Pancrustacea
- Class: Insecta
- Order: Lepidoptera
- Family: Gelechiidae
- Genus: Gnorimoschema
- Species: G. compsomorpha

Binomial name
- Gnorimoschema compsomorpha Meyrick, 1929

Species of moth

Gnorimoschema compsomorpha is a moth in the family Gelechiidae. It was described by Edward Meyrick in 1929. It is found in the US state of New Mexico.
