= Gnorimoschema reichli =

Scientific classification
- Kingdom: Animalia
- Phylum: Arthropoda
- Clade: Pancrustacea
- Class: Insecta
- Order: Lepidoptera
- Family: Gelechiidae
- Genus: Gnorimoschema
- Species: G. reichli

Binomial name
- Gnorimoschema reichli Povolný, 1998

Species of moth

Gnorimoschema reichli is a moth in the family Gelechiidae. It was described by Povolný in 1998. It is found in North America, where it has been recorded from Alberta and Yukon.

The length of the forewings is 6.5-7.2 mm.
