= Gnorimoschema nilsi =

Scientific classification
- Kingdom: Animalia
- Phylum: Arthropoda
- Clade: Pancrustacea
- Class: Insecta
- Order: Lepidoptera
- Family: Gelechiidae
- Genus: Gnorimoschema
- Species: G. nilsi

Binomial name
- Gnorimoschema nilsi Huemer, 1996

Species of moth

Gnorimoschema nilsi is a moth in the family Gelechiidae. It was described by Peter Huemer in 1996. It is found in the Alps of Austria and Italy.

The length of the forewings is 6.8–8 mm. Adults have been recorded on wing from mid-July to mid-August.
