= Gnorimoschema contraria =

Scientific classification
- Kingdom: Animalia
- Phylum: Arthropoda
- Clade: Pancrustacea
- Class: Insecta
- Order: Lepidoptera
- Family: Gelechiidae
- Genus: Gnorimoschema
- Species: G. contraria

Binomial name
- Gnorimoschema contraria Braun, 1921

Species of moth

Gnorimoschema contraria is a moth in the family Gelechiidae. It was described by Annette Frances Braun in 1921. It is found in North America, where it has been recorded from Montana.

The wingspan is 15–16 mm. The costal two-thirds of the forewing are reddish brown, with the costa and veins marked with lines of white broadly black-barred scales, the lines sometimes confluent in the apical half of the wing. The dorsal third of the wing from the base to the apex is clothed with white scales barred before their tips with black of varying width. The dorsal margin is distinctly lighter than the remainder of the wing. The paler dorsal portion is irregular indented with blunt tooth-like projections of the brown ground color. These teeth are partially filled up and edged with blackish scales, heightening the contrast between the two areas. Three of these patches of black scales stand out prominently and there is an elongate one near base, one in each of the two succeeding teeth and extending up onto the cell. The hindwings are gray, with a faint reddish tinge.
