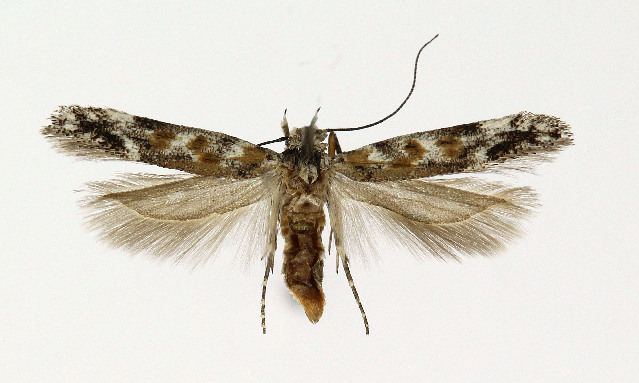

Scientific classification
- Kingdom: Animalia
- Phylum: Arthropoda
- Clade: Pancrustacea
- Class: Insecta
- Order: Lepidoptera
- Family: Gelechiidae
- Genus: Gnorimoschema
- Species: G. streliciella

Binomial name
- Gnorimoschema streliciella (Herrich-Schäffer, 1854)

Synonyms
- Gelechia streliciella Herrich-Schäffer, 1854; Phthorimaea strelitziella Heinemann, 1870; Gelechia cinctipunctella Erschoff, [1877]; Gnorimoschema mongolorum Povolný, 1969

= Gnorimoschema streliciella =

Species of moth

Gnorimoschema streliciella is a moth of the family Gelechiidae. It is locally distributed from central and northern Europe to the southern Ural Mountains and from Siberia and Mongolia to the Amur region and northern China.

The wingspan is 13–14 mm. Adults are on wing in June and July.

The larvae feed on Antennaria dioica.

== Subspecies ==
- Gnorimoschema streliciella streliciella
- Gnorimoschema streliciella mongolorum Povolny, 1969
