= Gnorimoschema epithymella =

Scientific classification
- Kingdom: Animalia
- Phylum: Arthropoda
- Clade: Pancrustacea
- Class: Insecta
- Order: Lepidoptera
- Family: Gelechiidae
- Genus: Gnorimoschema
- Species: G. epithymella

Binomial name
- Gnorimoschema epithymella (Staudinger, 1859)

Synonyms
- Gelechia epithymella Staudinger, 1859; Gnorimoschema epithymellum kirgisicum Povolný, 1994; Phthorimaea brunneomaculella Hackman, 1946; Phthorimaea boerneri Amsel, 1952

Species of moth

Gnorimoschema epithymella is a moth in the family Gelechiidae. It was described by Staudinger in 1859. It is found in Spain, France, Austria, Switzerland, Italy, Sardinia, Norway, Sweden, Finland, Estonia, Latvia, Belarus and Russia. Outside of Europe, it has been recorded from North Africa (Algeria) and Kyrgyzstan.

The wingspan is 12–13 mm.

== Subspecies ==
- Gnorimoschema epithymella epithymella
- Gnorimoschema epithymella brunneomaculella (Hackman, 1946) (Fennoscandia)
- Gnorimoschema epithymella boerneri (Amsel, 1952) (Sardinia)
