= Gnorimoschema gallaespeciosum =

Scientific classification
- Kingdom: Animalia
- Phylum: Arthropoda
- Clade: Pancrustacea
- Class: Insecta
- Order: Lepidoptera
- Family: Gelechiidae
- Genus: Gnorimoschema
- Species: G. gallaespeciosum

Binomial name
- Gnorimoschema gallaespeciosum Miller, 2000

Species of moth

Gnorimoschema gallaespeciosum is a moth in the family Gelechiidae. It was described by William E. Miller in 2000. It is found in North America, where it has been recorded from Minnesota and Alberta.

The larvae feed on Solidago speciosa.
