= Gnorimoschema soffneri =

Scientific classification
- Kingdom: Animalia
- Phylum: Arthropoda
- Clade: Pancrustacea
- Class: Insecta
- Order: Lepidoptera
- Family: Gelechiidae
- Genus: Gnorimoschema
- Species: G. soffneri

Binomial name
- Gnorimoschema soffneri (Riedl, 1965)

Synonyms
- Lerupsia soffneri Riedl, 1965; Gnorimoschema antiquum Povolný, 1967; Gnorimoschema antiquum montanum Povolný, 1967

Species of moth

Gnorimoschema soffneri is a moth in the family Gelechiidae. It was described by Riedl in 1965. It is found on Corsica, Sicily and Crete, as well as in Spain, Italy, Bulgaria, Hungary, Turkey, Iraq, Iran and Afghanistan.

== Subspecies ==
- Gnorimoschema soffneri soffneri
- Gnorimoschema soffneri montanum Povolný, 1967 (Iran, Afghanistan)
