= Gnorimoschema serratipalpella =

Scientific classification
- Kingdom: Animalia
- Phylum: Arthropoda
- Clade: Pancrustacea
- Class: Insecta
- Order: Lepidoptera
- Family: Gelechiidae
- Genus: Gnorimoschema
- Species: G. serratipalpella

Binomial name
- Gnorimoschema serratipalpella (Chambers, 1877)

Synonyms
- Gelechia serratipalpella Chambers, 1877

Species of moth

Gnorimoschema serratipalpella is a moth in the family Gelechiidae. It was described by Vactor Tousey Chambers in 1877. It is found in North America, where it has been recorded from Colorado and New Mexico.

The forewings are pale orange yellow, the base and the dorsal margin to and around the apex gray and the cilia of the costal margin and the extreme costal margin to the base also gray. The base of the cilia is dusted with brown, and the orange yellow of the apical part of the wings is also sparsely dusted with brown. At the base of the wing, the gray portion is externally margined with brown, and the gray of the hind margin sends three small projections, or teeth, into the yellow. One of these projections is beneath the fold before the middle of the wing length, while the others are above the fold, one of them about the middle of the wing length, and the other a little farther back. Each of these projections is tipped with brown scales, and immediately behind the last one the usual costal and dorsal spots, the dorsal being the largest, are indicated by a paler gray than that of the surrounding portion of the wing. In the cilia, at the apex of the wing, is a small brown spot, and there are one or two others before it in the costal cilia. The hindwings are pale leaden gray.
