= Gnorimoschema ilyella =

Scientific classification
- Kingdom: Animalia
- Phylum: Arthropoda
- Clade: Pancrustacea
- Class: Insecta
- Order: Lepidoptera
- Family: Gelechiidae
- Genus: Gnorimoschema
- Species: G. ilyella

Binomial name
- Gnorimoschema ilyella (Zeller, 1877)

Synonyms
- Gelechia (Lita) ilyella Zeller, 1877

Species of moth

Gnorimoschema ilyella is a moth in the family Gelechiidae. It was described by Philipp Christoph Zeller in 1877. It is found in Colombia.
