= Gnorimoschema collinusella =

Scientific classification
- Kingdom: Animalia
- Phylum: Arthropoda
- Clade: Pancrustacea
- Class: Insecta
- Order: Lepidoptera
- Family: Gelechiidae
- Genus: Gnorimoschema
- Species: G. collinusella

Binomial name
- Gnorimoschema collinusella (Chambers, 1877)

Synonyms
- Gelechia collinusella Chambers, 1877

Species of moth

Gnorimoschema collinusella is a moth in the family Gelechiidae. It was described by Vactor Tousey Chambers in 1877. It is found in North America, where it has been recorded from Colorado.

The forewings are very pale yellow, almost whitish, with three whitish fasciae not very distinct from the surrounding parts of the wing, except by the brownish scales with which they are dusted. The first is about the basal fourth, the second about the middle, and the third just before the cilia, and each of the first two contains a small brownish spot placed just above the fold. The apex and cilia are sparsely dusted with brownish scales. The hindwings are pale fuscous.
