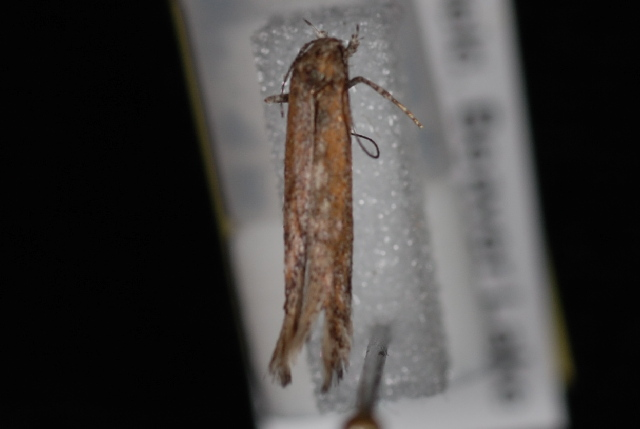
- Gnorimoschema albimarginella

Scientific classification
- Domain: Eukaryota
- Kingdom: Animalia
- Phylum: Arthropoda
- Class: Insecta
- Order: Lepidoptera
- Family: Gelechiidae
- Subfamily: Gelechiinae
- Tribe: Gnorimoschemini
- Genus: Gnorimoschema; Busck, 1900

Synonyms
- Lerupsia Riedl, 1965; Neoschema Povolný, 1967

= Gnorimoschema =

Genus of moths

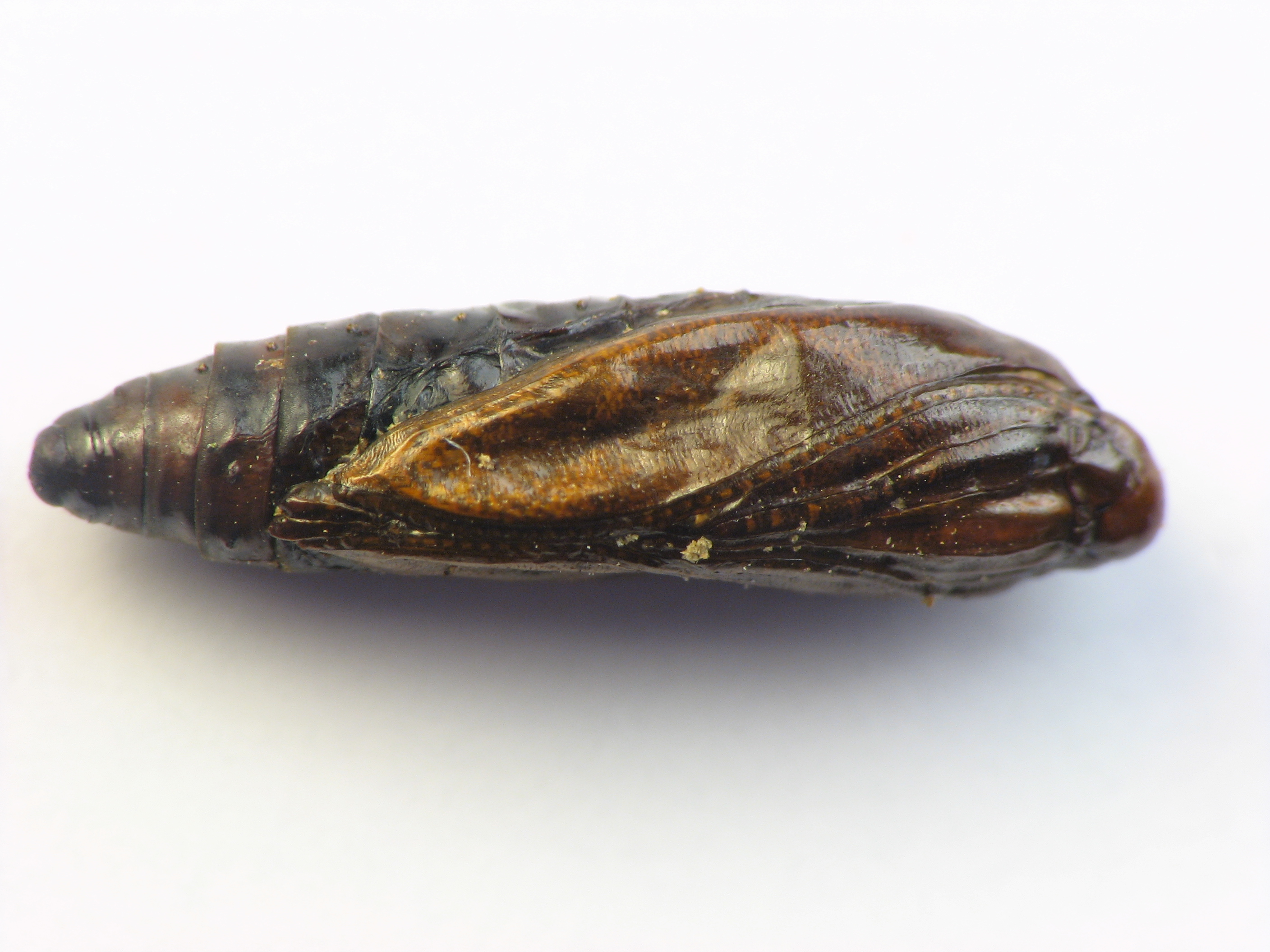
Pupa of Gnorimoschema gallaesolidaginis extracted from elliptical goldenrod gall

Gnorimoschema is a genus of moths in the family Gelechiidae.

== Species ==
- Gnorimoschema alaricella Busck, 1908
- Gnorimoschema alaskense Povolný, 1967
- Gnorimoschema albangulatum Braun, 1926
- Gnorimoschema albestre Povolný, 2003
- Gnorimoschema albimarginella (Chambers, 1875)
- Gnorimoschema ambrosiaeella (Chambers, 1875)
- Gnorimoschema anomale Povolný, 2003
- Gnorimoschema assimile Povolný, 2003
- Gnorimoschema aterrimum Powell & Povolný, 2001
- Gnorimoschema baccharisella Busck, 1903
- Gnorimoschema bacchariselloides Powell & Povolný, 2001
- Gnorimoschema banksiella Busck, 1903
- Gnorimoschema batanella Busck, 1903
- Gnorimoschema bodillum Karsholt & Nielsen, 1974
- Gnorimoschema brachiatum Povolný, 1998
- Gnorimoschema brackenridgiella (Busck, 1903)
- Gnorimoschema busckiella Kearfott, 1903
- Gnorimoschema clavatum Povolný, 1998
- Gnorimoschema collinusella (Chambers, 1877)
- Gnorimoschema compsomorpha Meyrick, 1929
- Gnorimoschema contraria Braun, 1921
- Gnorimoschema coquillettella Busck, 1902
- Gnorimoschema crypticum Powell & Povolný, 2001
- Gnorimoschema curiosum Povolný, 2003
- Gnorimoschema debenedictisi Powell & Povolný, 2001
- Gnorimoschema dryosyrta (Meyrick, 1931)
- Gnorimoschema dudiella Busck, 1903
- Gnorimoschema elatior Povolný, 2003
- Gnorimoschema elbursicum Povolný, 1984
- Gnorimoschema epithymella (Staudinger, 1859)
- Gnorimoschema ericameriae Keifer, 1933
- Gnorimoschema ericoidesi Powell & Povolný, 2001
- Gnorimoschema faustella Busck, 1910
- Gnorimoschema ferrugineum Povolný, 2003
- Gnorimoschema florella Busck, 1903
- Gnorimoschema foliatum Povolný, 2003
- Gnorimoschema gallaeasterella (Kellicott, 1878)
- Gnorimoschema gallaesolidaginis (Riley, 1869)
- Gnorimoschema gallaespeciosum Miller, 2000
- Gnorimoschema geminum Povolný, 2003
- Gnorimoschema generale Povolný, 2003
- Gnorimoschema gibsoniella Busck, 1915
- Gnorimoschema gracile Povolný, 2003
- Gnorimoschema grindeliae Powell & Povolný, 2001
- Gnorimoschema grisella (Chambers, 1872)
- Gnorimoschema herbichii (Nowicki, 1864)
- Gnorimoschema hoefneri (Rebel, 1909)
- Gnorimoschema huffmanellum Metzler & Adamski, 2002
- Gnorimoschema ilyella (Zeller, 1877)
- Gnorimoschema inexperta (Meyrick, 1925)
- Gnorimoschema intermedium Povolný, 2003
- Gnorimoschema interrogationum Povolný, 2003
- Gnorimoschema jalavai Povolný, 1994
- Gnorimoschema jocelynae Miller, 2000
- Gnorimoschema klotsi Povolný, 1967
- Gnorimoschema lateritium Povolný, 2003
- Gnorimoschema ligulatum Povolný, 1998
- Gnorimoschema lipatiella (Busck, 1909)
- Gnorimoschema lobatum (Povolný, 1998)
- Gnorimoschema marmorella (Chambers, 1875)
- Gnorimoschema mikkolai Povolný, 1994
- Gnorimoschema milleriella (Chambers, 1875)
- Gnorimoschema minor (Busck, 1906)
- Gnorimoschema motasi (Povolný, 1977)
- Gnorimoschema nanulum Povolný, 1998
- Gnorimoschema navajorum Povolný, 2003
- Gnorimoschema nilsi Huemer, 1996
- Gnorimoschema nordlandicolella (Strand, 1902)
- Gnorimoschema nupponeni Huemer & Karsholt, 2010
- Gnorimoschema obscurior Povolný, 1998
- Gnorimoschema octomaculella (Chambers, 1875)
- Gnorimoschema ovinum Povolný, 2003
- Gnorimoschema pamira
- Gnorimoschema paternale Povolný, 2003
- Gnorimoschema pedmontella (Chambers, 1877)
- Gnorimoschema penetrans Povolný, 2003
- Gnorimoschema perditum Povolný, 2003
- Gnorimoschema petiolatum Povolný, 1998
- Gnorimoschema pocketosum Povolný, 2003
- Gnorimoschema powelli Povolný, 1998
- Gnorimoschema radkevichi Piskunov, 1980
- Gnorimoschema ramulata (Meyrick, 1926)
- Gnorimoschema reichli (Povolný, 1998)
- Gnorimoschema robustella (Staudinger, 1871)
- Gnorimoschema rotundatum Povolný, 1998
- Gnorimoschema salinaris Busck, 1911
- Gnorimoschema saphirinella (Chambers, 1875)
- Gnorimoschema segregatum (Povolný, 1998)
- Gnorimoschema semicyclionella Busck, 1903
- Gnorimoschema septentrionella Fyles, 1911
- Gnorimoschema serratipalpella (Chambers, 1877)
- Gnorimoschema shepherdiae Priest, 2014
- Gnorimoschema signatum Povolný, 2003
- Gnorimoschema siskiouense Povolný, 1985
- Gnorimoschema slabaughi Miller, 2000
- Gnorimoschema soffneri Riedl, 1965
- Gnorimoschema spinosum Povolný, 1998
- Gnorimoschema splendoriferella Busck, 1904
- Gnorimoschema sporomochla Meyrick, 1929
- Gnorimoschema steueri Povolný, 1975
- Gnorimoschema stigmaticum Powell & Povolný, 2001
- Gnorimoschema streliciella (Herrich-Schaffer, 1854)
- Gnorimoschema subterranea Busck, 1911
- Gnorimoschema tediosum Povolný, 2003
- Gnorimoschema tenerum Powell & Povolný, 2001
- Gnorimoschema terracottella Busck, 1900
- Gnorimoschema triforceps Povolný, 2003
- Gnorimoschema trilobatum Povolný, 2003
- Gnorimoschema triocellella (Chambers, 1877)
- Gnorimoschema tunicatum Povolný, 1998
- Gnorimoschema valesiella (Staudinger, 1877)
- Gnorimoschema vastificum Braun, 1926
- Gnorimoschema versicolorella (Chambers, 1872)
- Gnorimoschema vibei (Wolff, 1964)
- Gnorimoschema wagneri Povolný, 2003
- Gnorimoschema washingtoniella Busck, 1904

== Former species ==
- Gnorimoschema gudmannella (Walsingham 1897)
