= Gnorimoschema tunicatum =

Scientific classification
- Kingdom: Animalia
- Phylum: Arthropoda
- Clade: Pancrustacea
- Class: Insecta
- Order: Lepidoptera
- Family: Gelechiidae
- Genus: Gnorimoschema
- Species: G. tunicatum

Binomial name
- Gnorimoschema tunicatum Povolný, 1998

Species of moth

Gnorimoschema tunicatum is a moth in the family Gelechiidae. It was described by Povolný in 1998. It is found in North America, where it has been recorded from Alberta and Saskatchewan.
