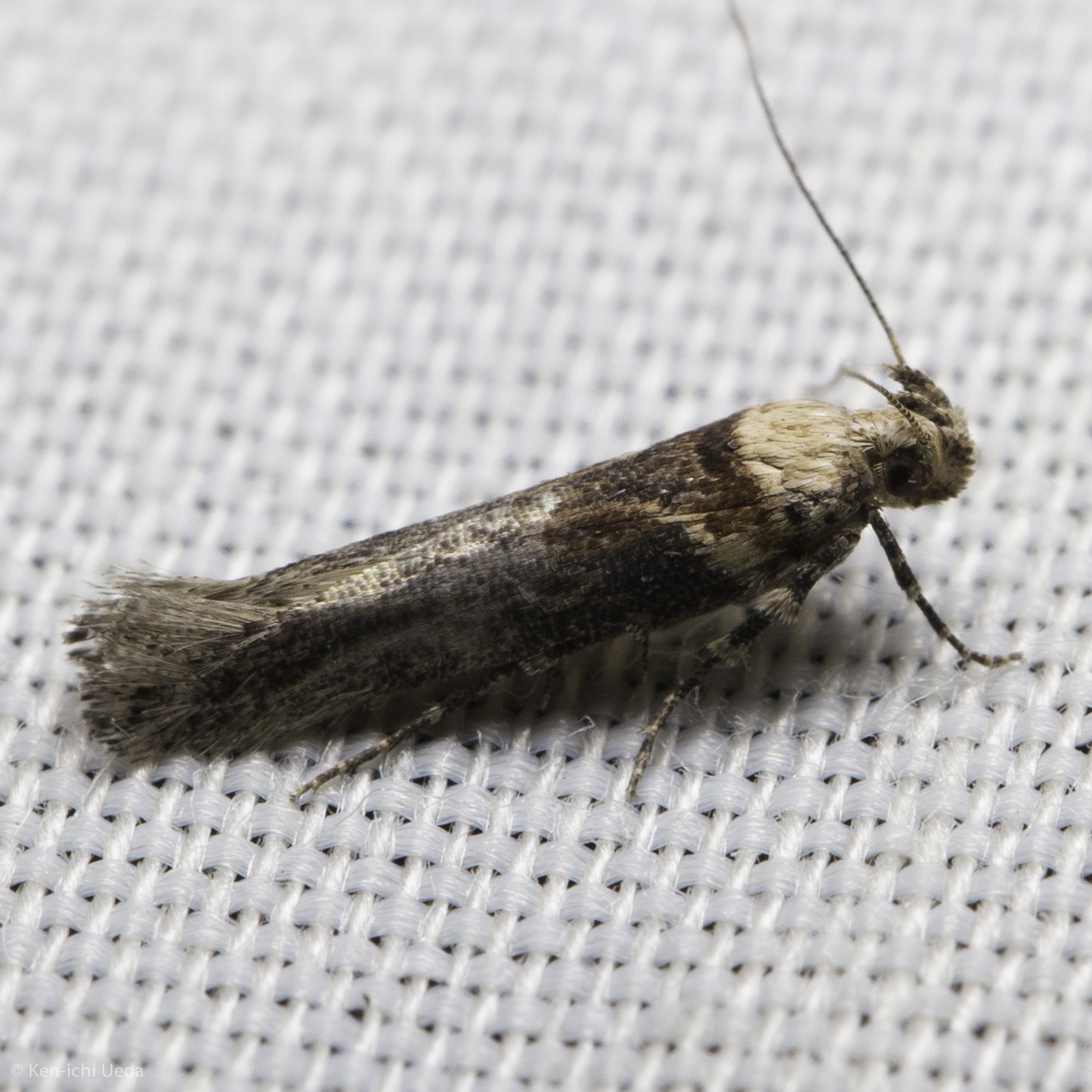
- Adult

Scientific classification
- Kingdom: Animalia
- Phylum: Arthropoda
- Clade: Pancrustacea
- Class: Insecta
- Order: Lepidoptera
- Family: Gelechiidae
- Genus: Gnorimoschema
- Species: G. baccharisella

Binomial name
- Gnorimoschema baccharisella Busck, 1903

= Gnorimoschema baccharisella =

Species of moth

Gnorimoschema baccharisella is a moth in the family Gelechiidae. It was described by August Busck in 1903. It is found in North America, where it has been recorded from California.

The length of the forewings is 6.2–8.5 mm for males and 6.5–9 mm for females. Adults are on wing from mid-July to late November.

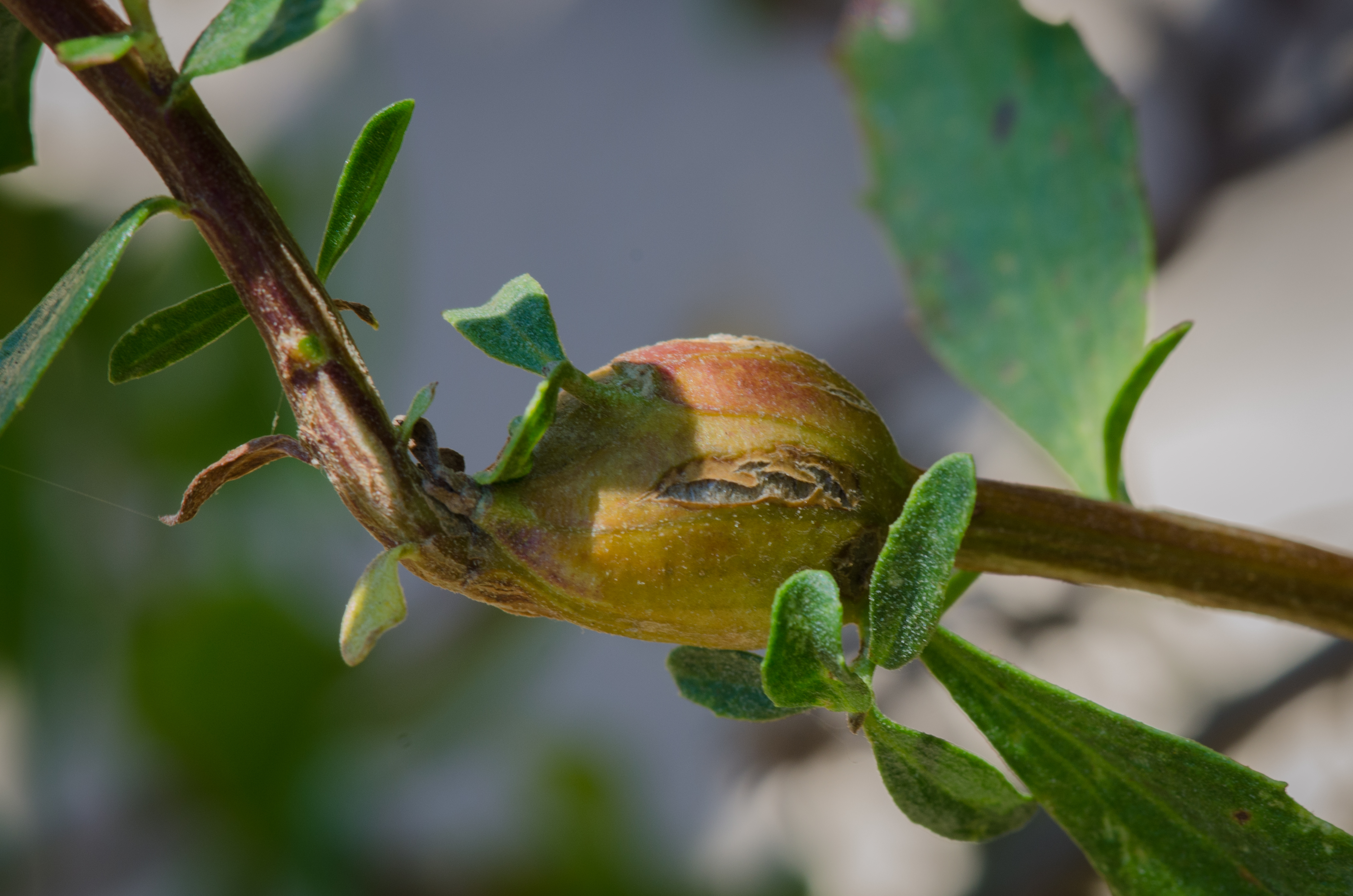
Coyote Brush Stem Gall caused by Gnorimoschema baccharisella

The larvae feed on Baccharis pilularis, causing hard stem galls. Pupation takes place on the ground.
