= Gnorimoschema dryosyrta =

Scientific classification
- Kingdom: Animalia
- Phylum: Arthropoda
- Clade: Pancrustacea
- Class: Insecta
- Order: Lepidoptera
- Family: Gelechiidae
- Genus: Gnorimoschema
- Species: G. dryosyrta

Binomial name
- Gnorimoschema dryosyrta (Meyrick, 1931)

Synonyms
- Gelechia dryosyrta Meyrick, 1931; Kiwaia dryosyrta (Meyrick, 1931)

Species of moth

Gnorimoschema dryosyrta is a moth in the family Gelechiidae. It was described by Edward Meyrick in 1931. It is found in Sikkim, India.
