= Gnorimoschema inexperta =

Scientific classification
- Kingdom: Animalia
- Phylum: Arthropoda
- Clade: Pancrustacea
- Class: Insecta
- Order: Lepidoptera
- Family: Gelechiidae
- Genus: Gnorimoschema
- Species: G. inexperta

Binomial name
- Gnorimoschema inexperta (Meyrick, 1925)

Synonyms
- Phthorimaea inexperta Meyrick, 1925; Gelechia simpliciella Chambers, 1875 (preocc. Stainton, 1858)

Species of moth

Gnorimoschema inexperta is a moth in the family Gelechiidae. It was described by C. Brown in 1925. It is found in North America, where it has been recorded from Kentucky.

Adults are pale greyish, slightly tinged with ochreous and with a small blackish discal spot about the middle of the wing, with four or five very small and indistinct ones before it, and two or three nearly in a line, behind it.
