= Gnorimoschema hoefneri =

Scientific classification
- Kingdom: Animalia
- Phylum: Arthropoda
- Clade: Pancrustacea
- Class: Insecta
- Order: Lepidoptera
- Family: Gelechiidae
- Genus: Gnorimoschema
- Species: G. hoefneri

Binomial name
- Gnorimoschema hoefneri (Rebel, 1909)

Synonyms
- Gelechia (Lita) hoefneri Rebel, 1909

Species of moth

Gnorimoschema hoefneri is a moth in the family Gelechiidae. It was described by Rebel in 1909. It is found in the Alps in Austria, Italy and Slovenia.

The wingspan is 17–18.5 mm. The forewings are whitish-grey, strigulated with blackish-grey scales. The hindwings are grey.
