= Gnorimoschema vastificum =

Scientific classification
- Kingdom: Animalia
- Phylum: Arthropoda
- Clade: Pancrustacea
- Class: Insecta
- Order: Lepidoptera
- Family: Gelechiidae
- Genus: Gnorimoschema
- Species: G. vastificum

Binomial name
- Gnorimoschema vastificum Braun, 1926

Species of moth

Gnorimoschema vastificum is a moth in the family Gelechiidae. It was described by Annette Frances Braun in 1926. It is found in North America, where it has been recorded from Manitoba, Yukon and California.

Adults have been recorded on wing in April, July and August, probably in multiple generations per year.

The larvae possibly feed on Salix species.
