= Gnorimoschema brachiatum =

Scientific classification
- Kingdom: Animalia
- Phylum: Arthropoda
- Clade: Pancrustacea
- Class: Insecta
- Order: Lepidoptera
- Family: Gelechiidae
- Genus: Gnorimoschema
- Species: G. brachiatum

Binomial name
- Gnorimoschema brachiatum Povolný, 1998

Species of moth

Gnorimoschema brachiatum is a moth in the family Gelechiidae. It was described by Povolný in 1998. It is found in North America, where it has been recorded from Colorado, Saskatchewan, Washington and Yukon.

The length of the forewings is about 5.5 mm.
