= Gnorimoschema faustella =

Scientific classification
- Kingdom: Animalia
- Phylum: Arthropoda
- Clade: Pancrustacea
- Class: Insecta
- Order: Lepidoptera
- Family: Gelechiidae
- Genus: Gnorimoschema
- Species: G. faustella

Binomial name
- Gnorimoschema faustella Busck, 1910

Species of moth

Gnorimoschema faustella is a moth in the family Gelechiidae. It was described by August Busck in 1910. It is found in North America, where it has been recorded from New Mexico.

The wingspan is about 16 mm. The forewings are dark brown with the costal apical and basal part of the dorsal edge blackish and with a dark brown cilia. There are three blackish-brown obscure round spots, one on the fold, one in the middle of the cell and one at the end of the cell. The hindwings are dark fuscous.
