= Gnorimoschema steueri =

Scientific classification
- Kingdom: Animalia
- Phylum: Arthropoda
- Clade: Pancrustacea
- Class: Insecta
- Order: Lepidoptera
- Family: Gelechiidae
- Genus: Gnorimoschema
- Species: G. steueri

Binomial name
- Gnorimoschema steueri Povolný, 1975

Species of moth

Gnorimoschema steueri is a moth in the family Gelechiidae. It was described by Povolný in 1975. It is found in France, Germany, Austria, Italy, the Czech Republic, Slovakia and Transbaikal. The habitat consists of rocky limestone steppes on edges of thermophilous oak forests.

The length of the forewings is 4.8-5.5 mm for females and 5.8–7 mm for males.
