= Gnorimoschema alaskense =

Scientific classification
- Kingdom: Animalia
- Phylum: Arthropoda
- Clade: Pancrustacea
- Class: Insecta
- Order: Lepidoptera
- Family: Gelechiidae
- Genus: Gnorimoschema
- Species: G. alaskense

Binomial name
- Gnorimoschema alaskense Povolný, 1967

Synonyms
- Gnorimoschema valesiella alaskense Povolný, 1967

Species of moth

Gnorimoschema alaskense is a moth in the family Gelechiidae. It was described by Povolný in 1967. It is found in North America, where it has been recorded from Alaska, Yukon, Saskatchewan, Colorado, Manitoba and South Dakota.
