= Gnorimoschema vibei =

Scientific classification
- Kingdom: Animalia
- Phylum: Arthropoda
- Clade: Pancrustacea
- Class: Insecta
- Order: Lepidoptera
- Family: Gelechiidae
- Genus: Gnorimoschema
- Species: G. vibei

Binomial name
- Gnorimoschema vibei (Wolff, 1964)

Synonyms
- Phthorimaea vibei Wolff, 1964

Species of moth

Gnorimoschema vibei is a moth in the family Gelechiidae. It was described by Wolff in 1964. It is found in western Greenland and northern Quebec.

The length of the forewings is 5–6.5 mm.

The larvae feed on Salix glauca and sometimes Betula nana. They mine the leaves of their host plant.
