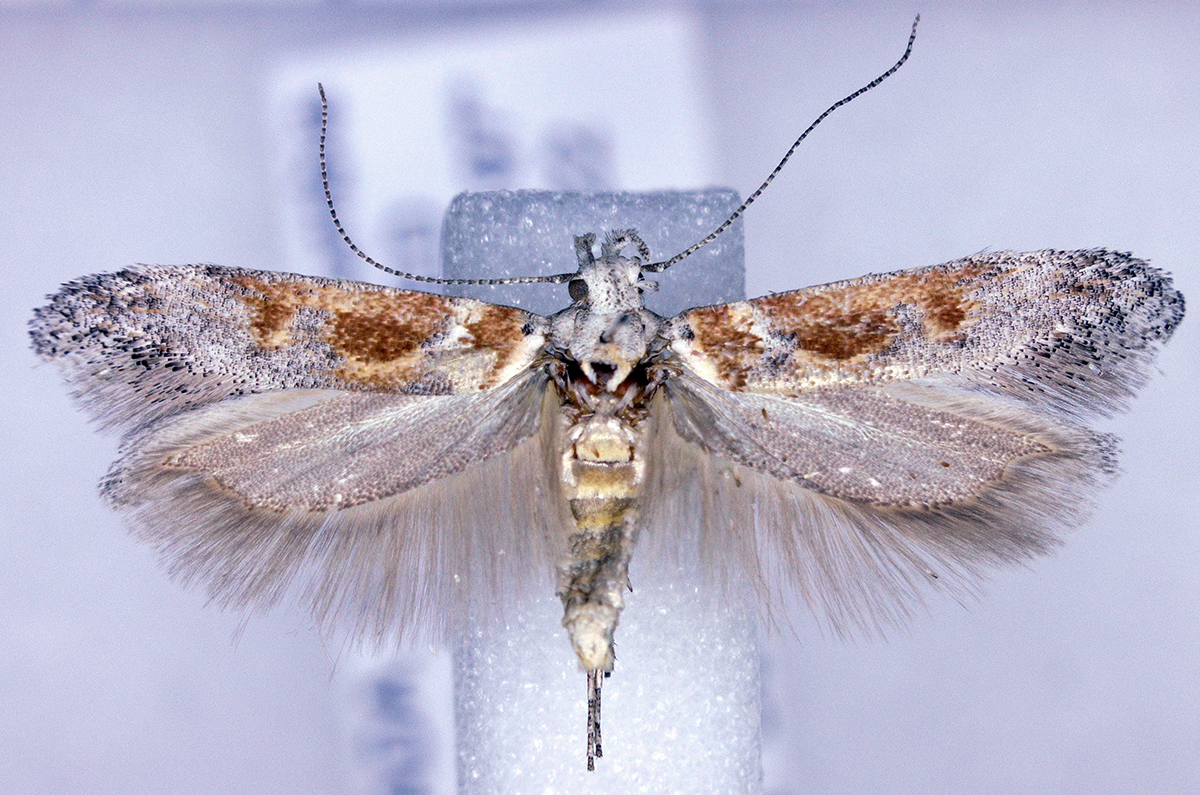

Scientific classification
- Kingdom: Animalia
- Phylum: Arthropoda
- Clade: Pancrustacea
- Class: Insecta
- Order: Lepidoptera
- Family: Gelechiidae
- Genus: Gnorimoschema
- Species: G. bacchariselloides

Binomial name
- Gnorimoschema bacchariselloides Powell & Povolný, 2001

= Gnorimoschema bacchariselloides =

Species of moth

Gnorimoschema bacchariselloides is a species of moth in the family Gelechiidae. It was described by Powell and Povolný in 2001. It is found in North America, where it has been recorded from California, Montana and Alberta.
