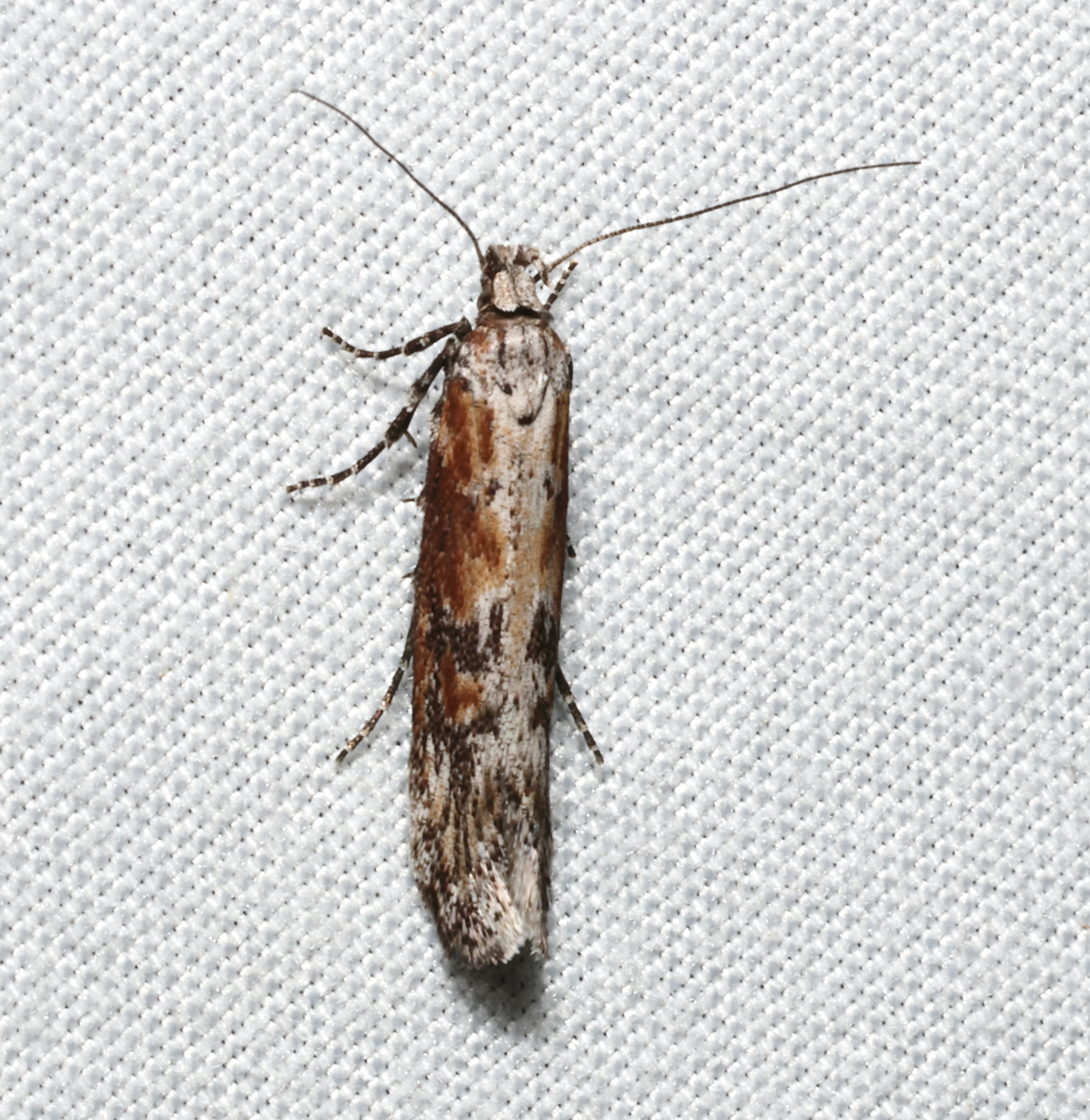

Scientific classification
- Kingdom: Animalia
- Phylum: Arthropoda
- Clade: Pancrustacea
- Class: Insecta
- Order: Lepidoptera
- Family: Gelechiidae
- Genus: Gnorimoschema
- Species: G. gallaeasterella

Binomial name
- Gnorimoschema gallaeasterella (Kellicott, 1878)

Synonyms
- Gelechia gallaeasterella Kellicott, 1878; Gelechia gallaediplopappi Fyles, 1890; Paedisca ceasiella Brodie, 1909; Gnorimoschema gallaeasteris Meyrick, 1925

= Gnorimoschema gallaeasterella =

Species of moth

Gnorimoschema gallaeasterella is a moth in the family Gelechiidae. It was described by D. S. Kellicott in 1878. It is found in North America, where it has been recorded from Alberta, California, Illinois, Kentucky, Maine, Maryland, New Hampshire, Oklahoma, Quebec and Tennessee.

The wingspan is about 20 mm. The forewings are white, speckled with brown and black and with a brown patch occupying the costal half of the middle third. It is darkest towards the base. Bordering the hind margin of the patch is a distinct dark brown line which terminates in a hook and just behind the middle of the patch are two short, parallel black dashes. Beyond these, in line with the apex, is a short, black, irregular mark. The hindwings are grey. Adults are on wing from June to October.

The larvae feed on Aster corymbosus and Solidago species. They form spindle galls on their host plant.
