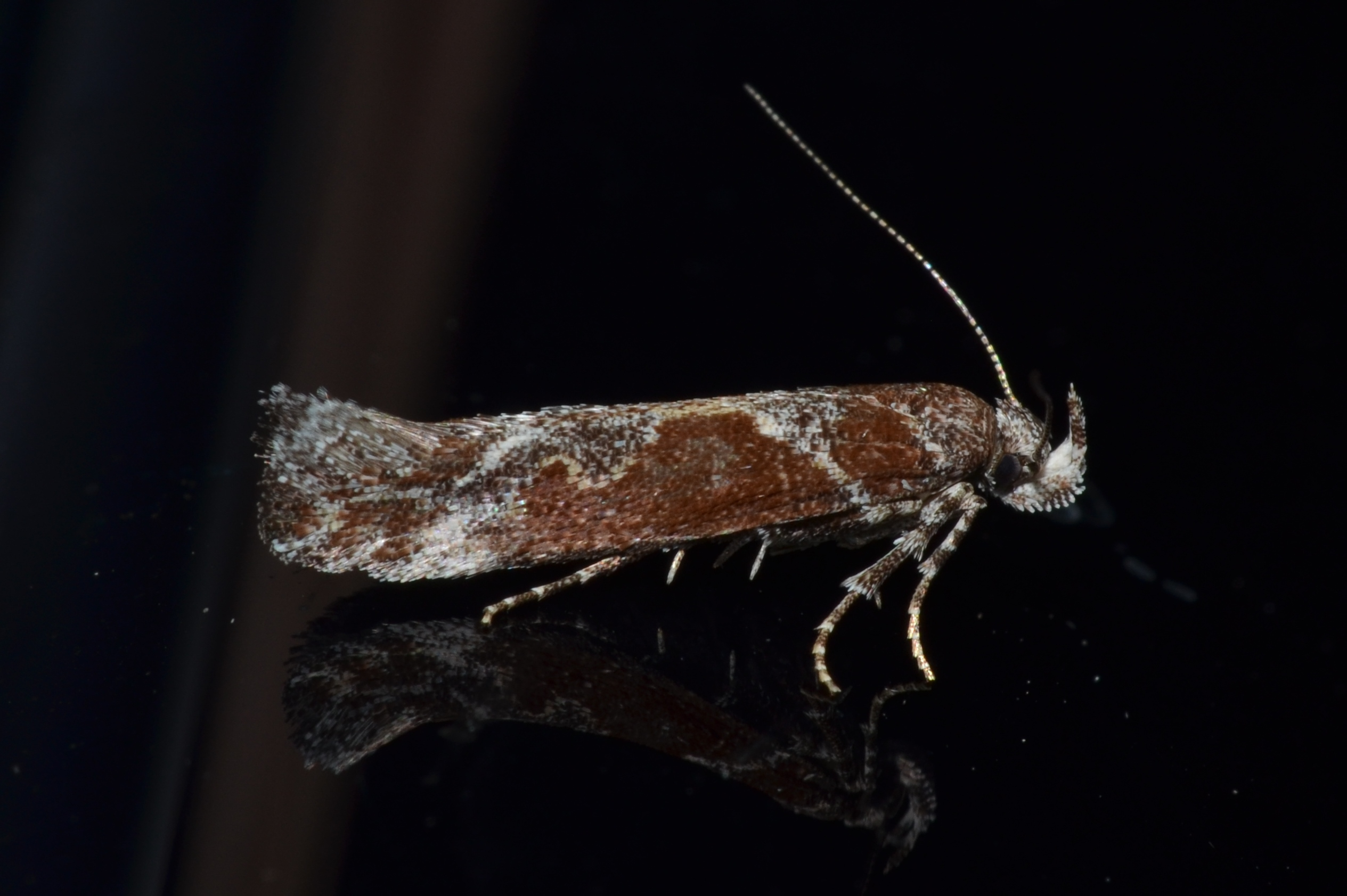

Scientific classification
- Kingdom: Animalia
- Phylum: Arthropoda
- Clade: Pancrustacea
- Class: Insecta
- Order: Lepidoptera
- Family: Gelechiidae
- Genus: Gnorimoschema
- Species: G. gallaesolidaginis

Binomial name
- Gnorimoschema gallaesolidaginis (Riley, 1869)

Synonyms
- Gelechia gallaesolidaginis Riley, 1869

= Gnorimoschema gallaesolidaginis =

Species of moth

Gnorimoschema gallaesolidaginis, the solidago gall moth, goldenrod gall moth or goldenrod gallmaker, is a moth in the family Gelechiidae. It was described by Riley in 1869. It is found in North America, where it has been recorded from Alberta, British Columbia, California, Florida, Illinois, Indiana, Kentucky, Maine, Maryland, Massachusetts, Michigan, Minnesota, Mississippi, Missouri, New Brunswick, New Hampshire, New York, North Carolina, Ohio, Oklahoma, Ontario, Pennsylvania, Quebec, Tennessee, Texas and Wisconsin.

The forewings are deep purplish-brown, more or less sprinkled with carneous (the color of flesh). A light carneous band starts from the costa near the base, and curves towards the middle of the inner margin, which it occupies to a little beyond the beginning of the cilia, where it curves upwards towards the tip, reaching only halfway up the wing. Here, it is approached from above by a somewhat diffuse spot of the same colour, which starts from the costa just behind the apex, and runs down to the middle of the wing. The hindwings are slate-gray.

The larvae feed on Solidago nemoralis, Solidago altissima and Solidago gigantea. They form spindle-shaped galls on their host plant.

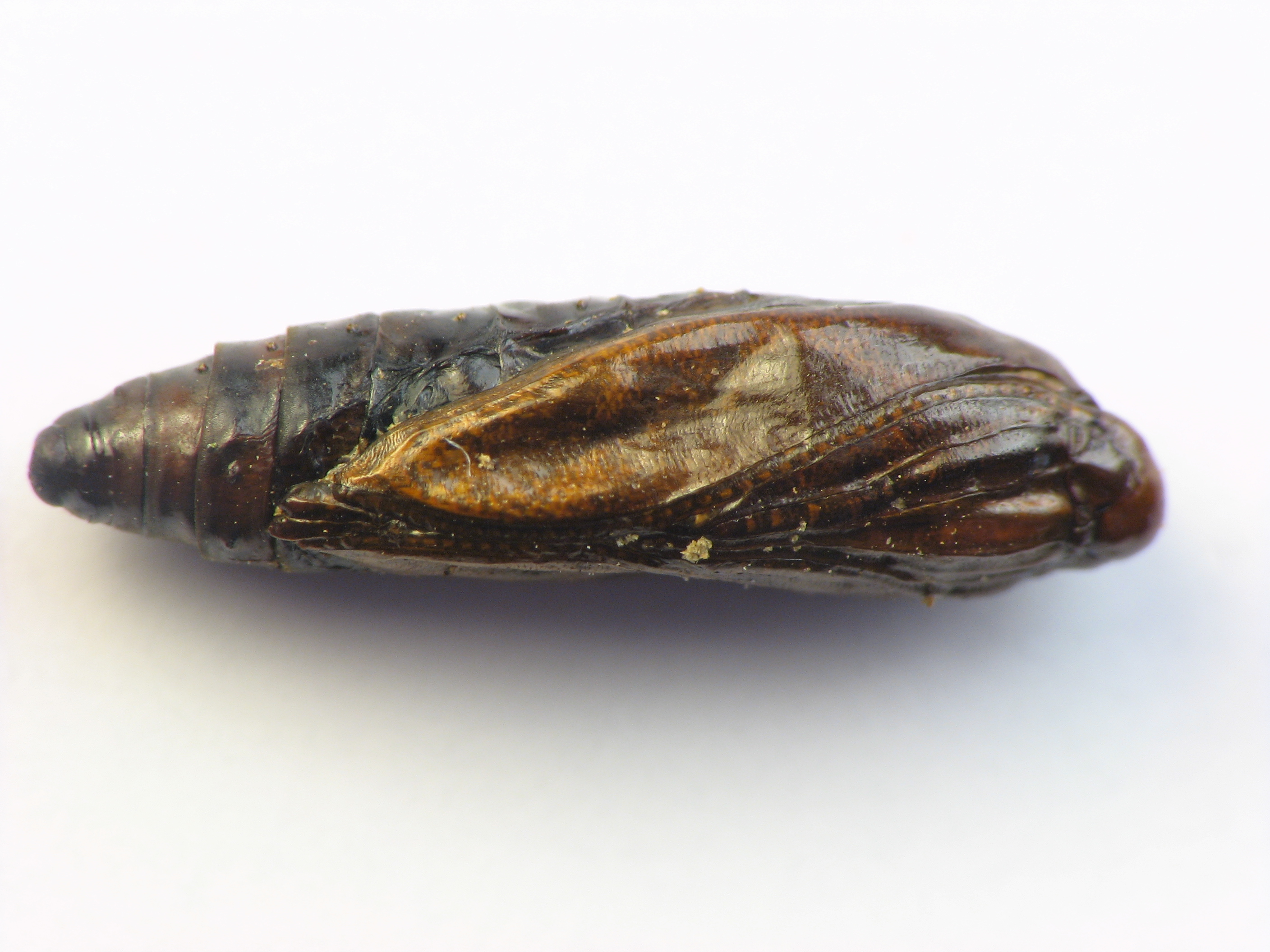
Pupa extracted from elliptical goldenrod gall. Size: 10 mm.

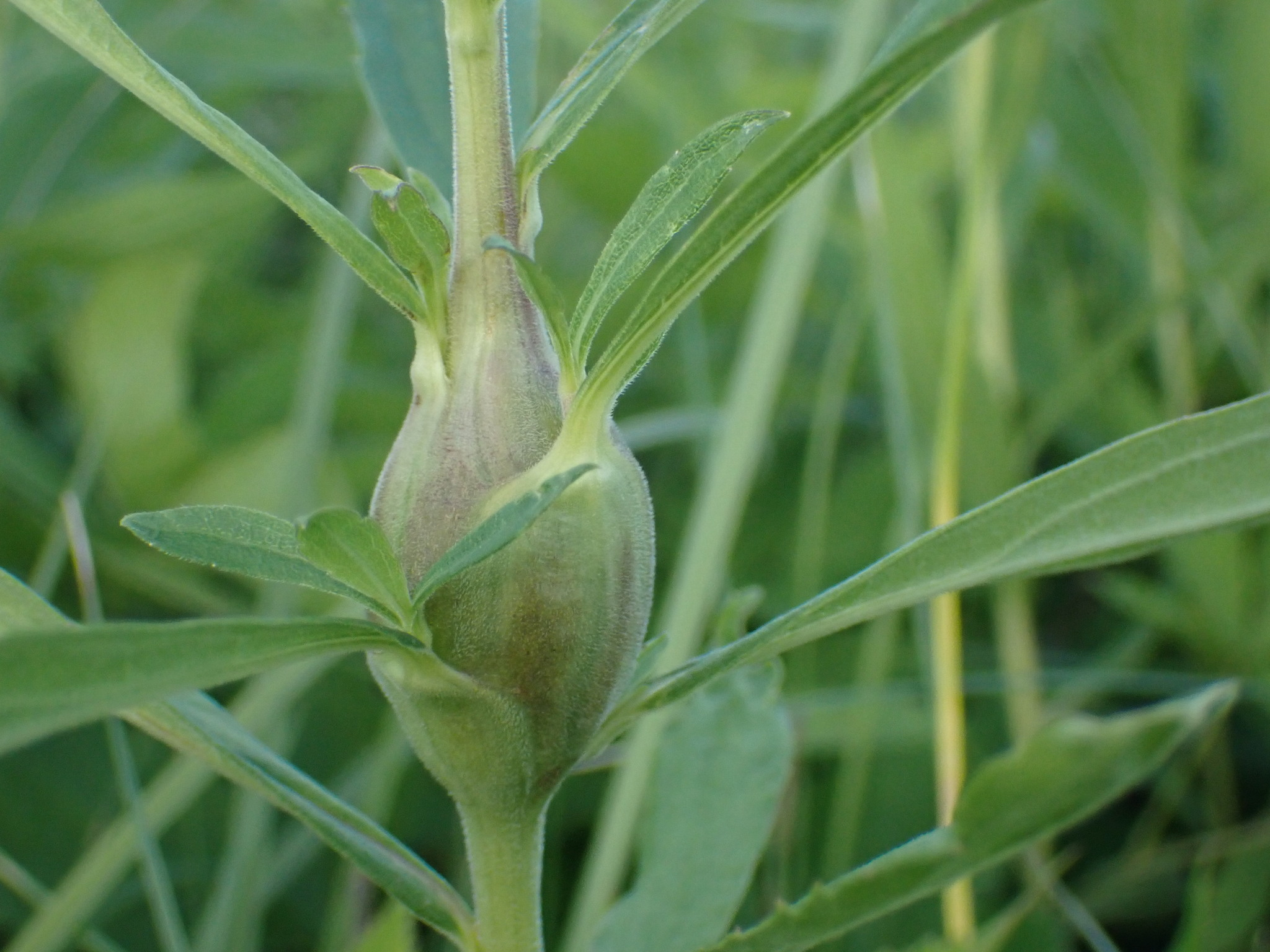
Elliptical goldenrod gall
