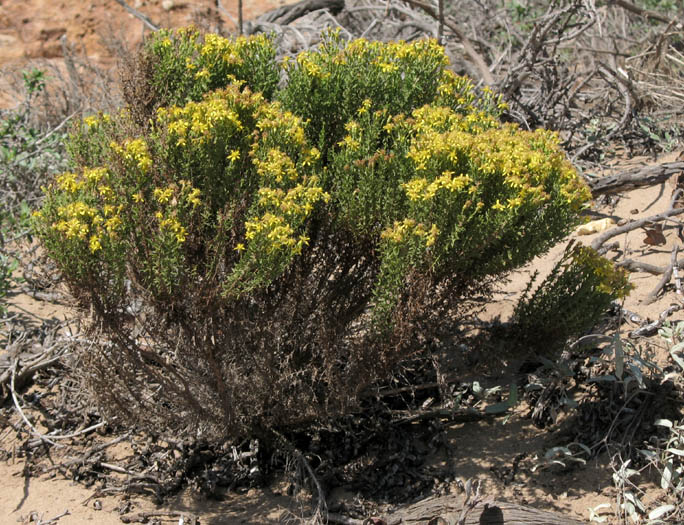

Scientific classification
- Kingdom: Plantae
- Clade: Embryophytes
- Clade: Tracheophytes
- Clade: Angiosperms
- Clade: Eudicots
- Clade: Asterids
- Order: Asterales
- Family: Asteraceae
- Genus: Ericameria
- Species: E. ericoides

Binomial name
- Ericameria ericoides (Less.) Jeps.

Synonyms
- Diplopappus ericoides Less.; Ericameria microphylla Nutt.; Haplopappus ericoides (Less.) Hook. & Arn.; Aplopappus ericoides (Less.) Hook. & Arn.

= Ericameria ericoides =

Species of flowering plant

Ericameria ericoides, known by the common names California goldenbush, mock heather, and California heathgoldenrod, is a species of flowering shrubs in the family Asteraceae. It is endemic to California, where it grows in the sand dunes and coastal hills between the northern San Francisco Bay Area and the Los Angeles area.

== Description ==
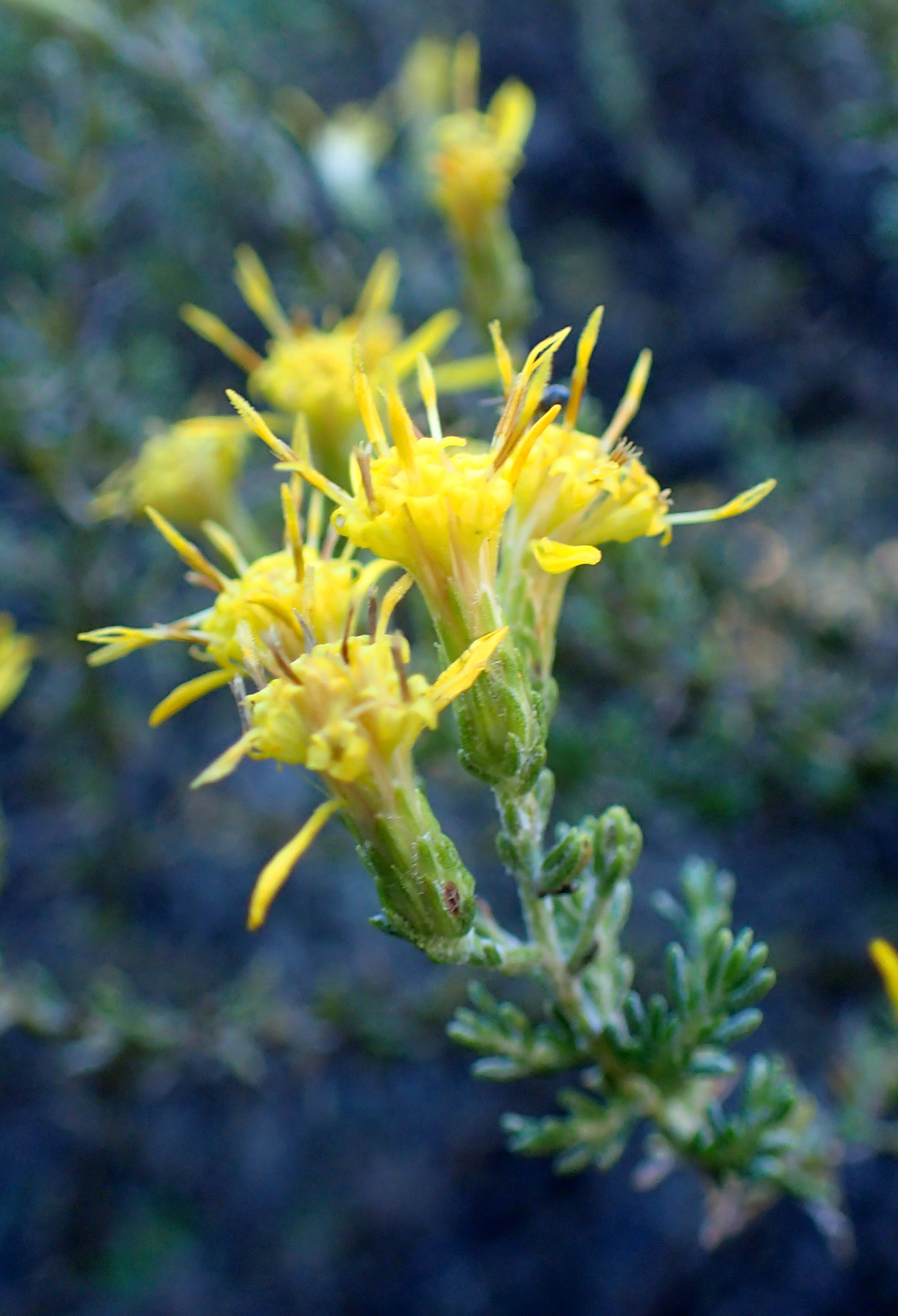
Ericameria ericoides, closeup of flowers

Ericameria ericoides is a shrub that rarely approaches a maximum height of 1 metre (3.3 ft). It is densely foliated with comblike fans of small cylindrical leaves up to a centimeter long.

Its small erect branches are topped with inflorescences of small golden yellow flower heads, each with several disc florets and a few ray florets.
