= Cyclophora azorensis =

Scientific classification
- Kingdom: Animalia
- Phylum: Arthropoda
- Clade: Pancrustacea
- Class: Insecta
- Order: Lepidoptera
- Family: Geometridae
- Genus: Cyclophora
- Species: C. azorensis

Binomial name
- Cyclophora azorensis (Prout, 1920)

Synonyms
- Cosymbia azorensis Prout, 1920

Species of moth

Cyclophora azorensis is a moth in the family Geometridae. It is found on the Azores.

The wingspan is 22–25 mm. It is similar to Cyclophora maderensis, but has broader wings and has a denser reddish irroration.

The larvae feed on Erica species.
