= Cyclophora nebulosata =

Scientific classification
- Kingdom: Animalia
- Phylum: Arthropoda
- Class: Insecta
- Order: Lepidoptera
- Family: Geometridae
- Genus: Cyclophora
- Species: C. nebulosata

Binomial name
- Cyclophora nebulosata (Walker, 1862)

Synonyms
- Anisodes nebulosata Walker, 1862

Species of moth

Cyclophora nebulosata is a moth of the family Geometridae first described by Francis Walker in 1862. It is found in Sri Lanka.

The caterpillar is known to feed on Ficus racemosa.
