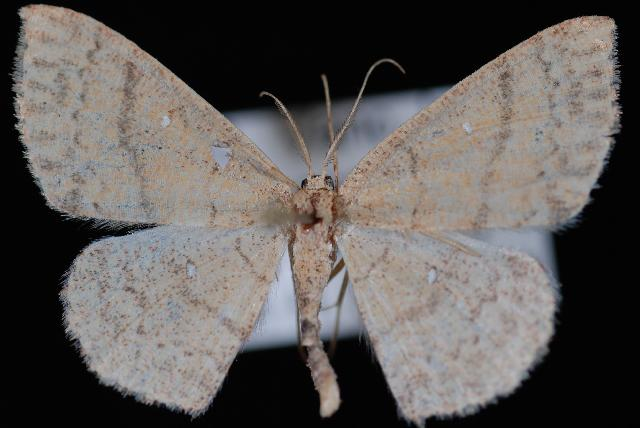

Scientific classification
- Kingdom: Animalia
- Phylum: Arthropoda
- Clade: Pancrustacea
- Class: Insecta
- Order: Lepidoptera
- Family: Geometridae
- Genus: Cyclophora
- Species: C. dataria

Binomial name
- Cyclophora dataria (Hulst, 1887)

Synonyms
- Acidalia dataria Hulst, 1887; Cosymbia microps Prout, 1936; Cosymbia piazzaria Wright, 1924

= Cyclophora dataria =

Species of moth

Cyclophora dataria is a moth in the family Geometridae. It is found in North America, from British Columbia to California, east to Arizona and north to Montana. The habitat consists of mixed or deciduous woods with Quercus species.

The wingspan is 23–25 mm. Adults are on wing in late spring and summer.

The larvae feed on the leaves of Quercus species. Larvae can be found in July and August.
