= Cyclophora albidiscata =

Scientific classification
- Kingdom: Animalia
- Phylum: Arthropoda
- Clade: Pancrustacea
- Class: Insecta
- Order: Lepidoptera
- Family: Geometridae
- Genus: Cyclophora
- Species: C. albidiscata

Binomial name
- Cyclophora albidiscata (Warren, 1897)

Synonyms
- Euephyra albidiscata Warren, 1897; Anisodes albidiscata; Anisodes fulgurata Warren, 1904

Species of moth

Cyclophora albidiscata is a moth in the family Geometridae. It is found in Costa Rica and Peru.
