= Cyclophora sublunata =

Scientific classification
- Kingdom: Animalia
- Phylum: Arthropoda
- Clade: Pancrustacea
- Class: Insecta
- Order: Lepidoptera
- Family: Geometridae
- Genus: Cyclophora
- Species: C. sublunata

Binomial name
- Cyclophora sublunata (C. Swinhoe, 1904)

Synonyms
- Perixera sublunata C. Swinhoe, 1904

Species of moth

Cyclophora sublunata is a moth in the family Geometridae first described by Charles Swinhoe in 1904. It is found in Ghana and Ivory Coast.
