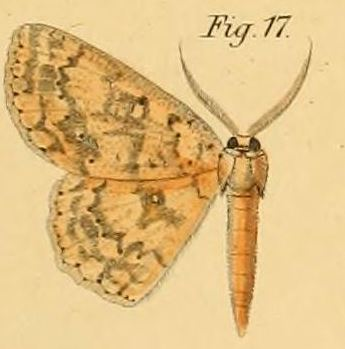

Scientific classification
- Kingdom: Animalia
- Phylum: Arthropoda
- Class: Insecta
- Order: Lepidoptera
- Family: Geometridae
- Genus: Cyclophora
- Species: C. lutearia

Binomial name
- Cyclophora lutearia (Dewitz, 1881)

Synonyms
- Ephyra lutearia Dewitz, 1881

= Cyclophora lutearia =

Species of moth

Cyclophora lutearia is a moth in the family Geometridae. It is found in Guinea and Nigeria.
