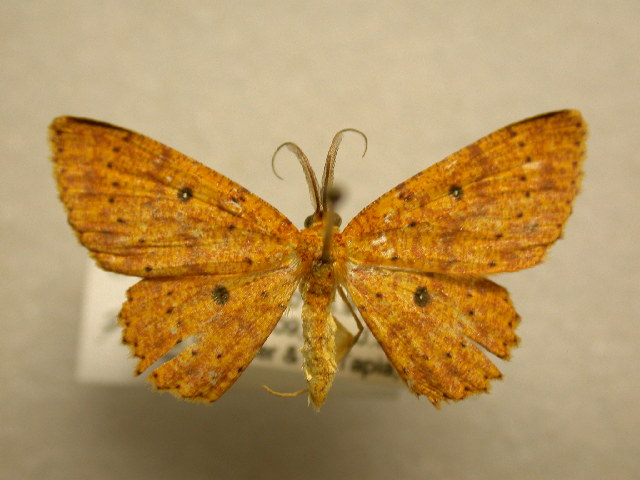

Scientific classification
- Kingdom: Animalia
- Phylum: Arthropoda
- Clade: Pancrustacea
- Class: Insecta
- Order: Lepidoptera
- Family: Geometridae
- Genus: Cyclophora
- Species: C. ferruginata

Binomial name
- Cyclophora ferruginata (Warren, 1900)

Synonyms
- Anisodes ferruginata Warren, 1900

= Cyclophora ferruginata =

Species of moth

Cyclophora ferruginata is a moth in the family Geometridae. It is found in western Ecuador.
