= Cyclophora conferta =

Scientific classification
- Kingdom: Animalia
- Phylum: Arthropoda
- Clade: Pancrustacea
- Class: Insecta
- Order: Lepidoptera
- Family: Geometridae
- Genus: Cyclophora
- Species: C. conferta

Binomial name
- Cyclophora conferta (Warren, 1900)

Synonyms
- Anisodes conferta Warren, 1900

Species of moth

Cyclophora conferta is a moth in the family Geometridae. It is found in Jamaica.
