= Cyclophora endospila =

Scientific classification
- Kingdom: Animalia
- Phylum: Arthropoda
- Clade: Pancrustacea
- Class: Insecta
- Order: Lepidoptera
- Family: Geometridae
- Genus: Cyclophora
- Species: C. endospila

Binomial name
- Cyclophora endospila (Prout, 1920)

Synonyms
- Pisoraca endospila Prout, 1920; Anisodes endospila

Species of moth

Cyclophora endospila is a moth in the family Geometridae. It is found in Peru.
