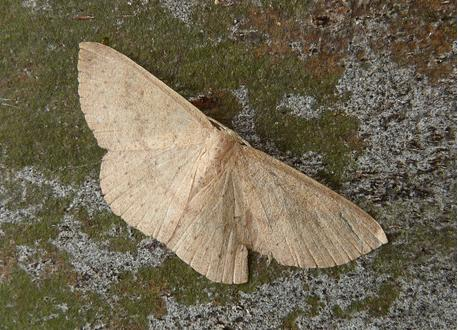

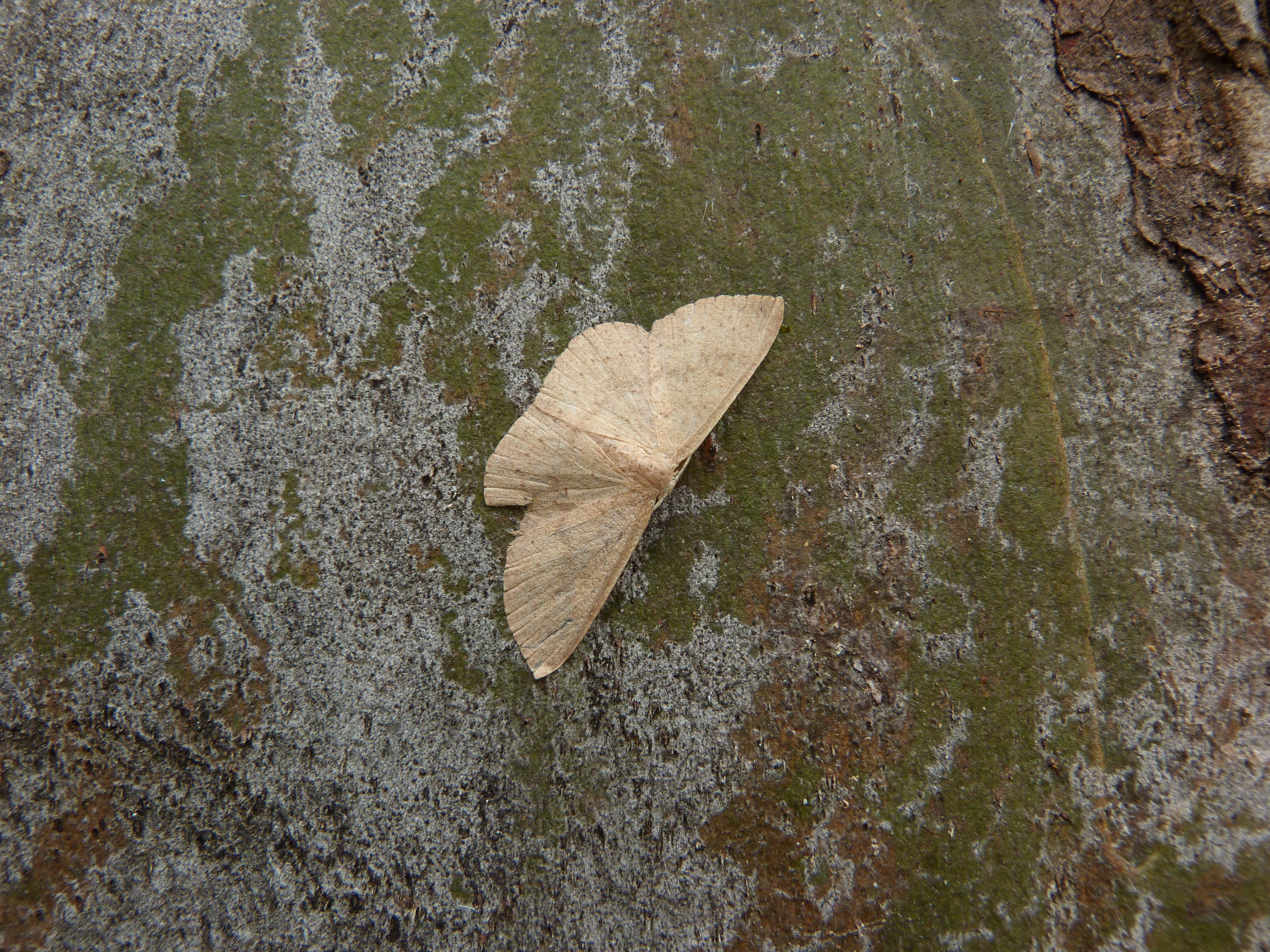

Scientific classification
- Kingdom: Animalia
- Phylum: Arthropoda
- Clade: Pancrustacea
- Class: Insecta
- Order: Lepidoptera
- Family: Geometridae
- Genus: Cyclophora
- Species: C. obstataria

Binomial name
- Cyclophora obstataria (Walker, 1861)

Synonyms
- Acidalia obstataria Walker, 1861; Anisodes ignorata Walker, 1863; Aspilates cryptorhodata Walker, 1863; Anisodes acuta Moore, 1887; Perixera imbuta Warren, 1897; Pisoraca tenuis Warren, 1907

= Cyclophora obstataria =

Species of moth

Cyclophora obstataria is a moth of the family Geometridae first described by Francis Walker in 1861. It is known from the Indian subregion, Sri Lanka and China to Sundaland, New Guinea and Queensland in Australia.

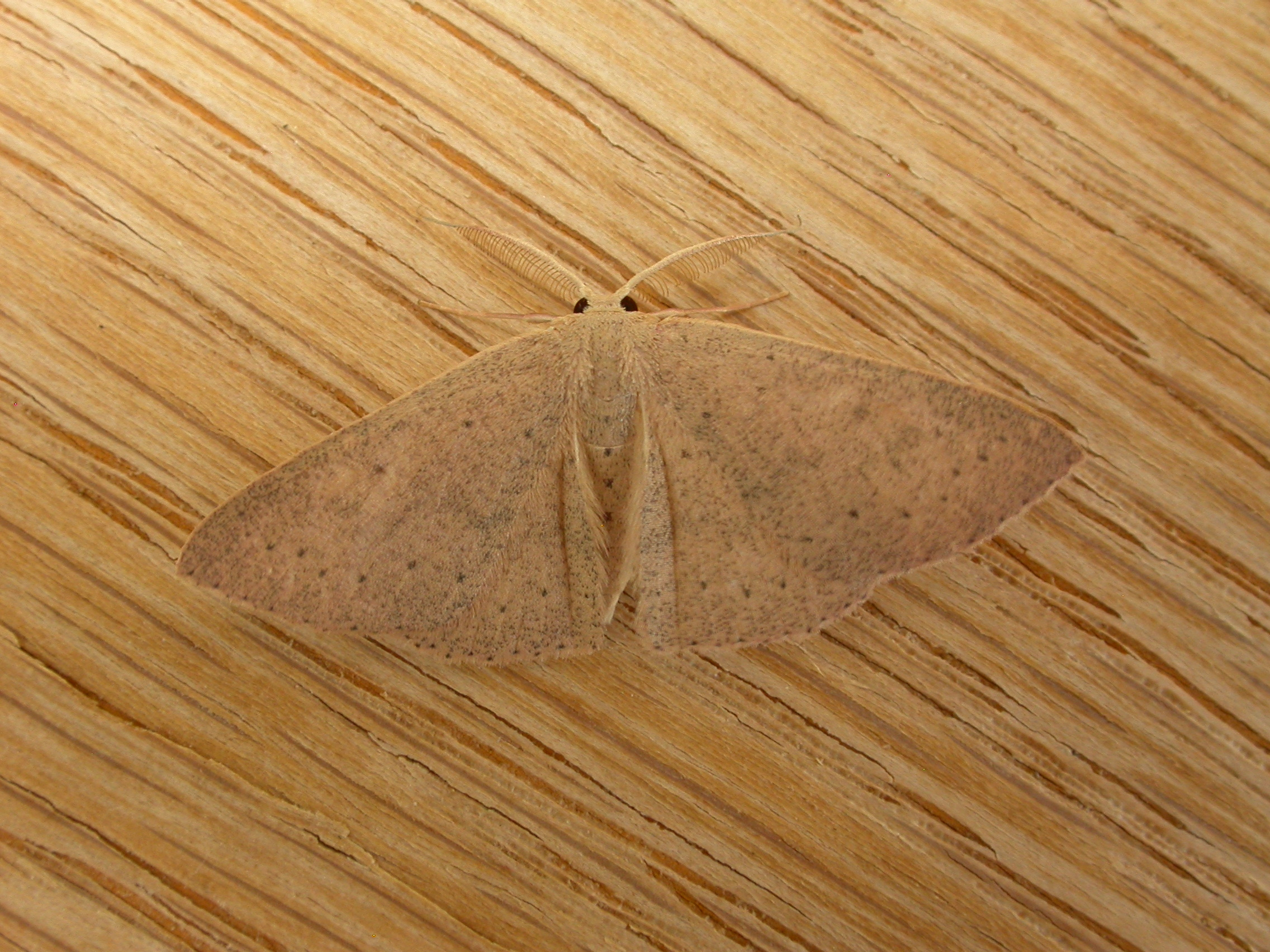

== Description ==
Its wingspan is about 26–30 mm. On the hind tibia of the male the inner medial spur is absent. Mid tibia of male not hairy. Forewings with veins 5, 6 and 7 not distorted. Forewings of male with non-distorted inner area. It is a pale pinkish-rufous colored moth. Frons pale with pink above it. Each wing with traces of antemedial specks series. Discocellular speck present. Faint traces of waved postmedial line and submarginal specks series present. Ventral side pale.

== Subspecies ==
- Cyclophora obstataria obstataria
- Cyclophora obstataria tenuis (Warren, 1907)
- Cyclophora obstataria cryptorhodata (Walker, 1863)
