= Cyclophora impudens =

Scientific classification
- Kingdom: Animalia
- Phylum: Arthropoda
- Clade: Pancrustacea
- Class: Insecta
- Order: Lepidoptera
- Family: Geometridae
- Genus: Cyclophora
- Species: C. impudens

Binomial name
- Cyclophora impudens (Warren, 1904)

Synonyms
- Perixera impudens Warren, 1904

Species of moth

Cyclophora impudens is a moth in the family Geometridae. It is found on the Galapagos Islands.
