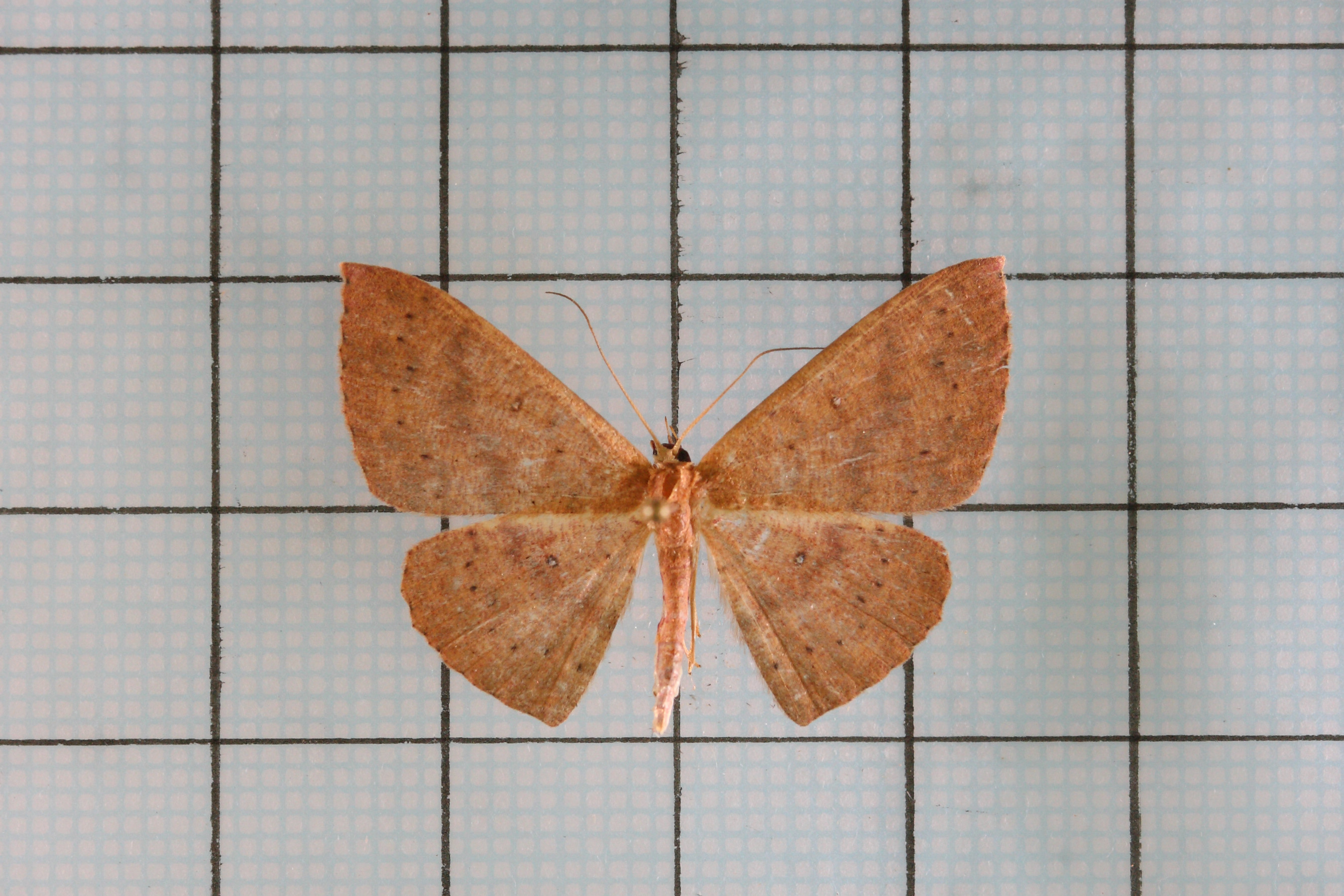

Scientific classification
- Kingdom: Animalia
- Phylum: Arthropoda
- Clade: Pancrustacea
- Class: Insecta
- Order: Lepidoptera
- Family: Geometridae
- Genus: Cyclophora
- Species: C. intermixtaria

Binomial name
- Cyclophora intermixtaria (C. Swinhoe, 1892)

Synonyms
- Anisodes intermixtaria C. Swinhoe, 1892

= Cyclophora intermixtaria =

Species of moth

Cyclophora intermixtaria is a moth of the family Geometridae first described by Charles Swinhoe in 1892. It is found in Taiwan, the Himalayas, Peninsular Malaysia and Borneo.

== Subspecies ==
- Cyclophora intermixtaria intermixtaria
- Cyclophora intermixtaria collustrata Prout, 1938 (Borneo)
