= Cyclophora concinnipicta =

Scientific classification
- Kingdom: Animalia
- Phylum: Arthropoda
- Clade: Pancrustacea
- Class: Insecta
- Order: Lepidoptera
- Family: Geometridae
- Genus: Cyclophora
- Species: C. concinnipicta

Binomial name
- Cyclophora concinnipicta (Prout, 1918)

Synonyms
- Anisodes concinnipicta Prout, 1918

Species of moth

Cyclophora concinnipicta is a moth in the family Geometridae. It is found in Colombia.
