= Cyclophora anaisaria =

Scientific classification
- Kingdom: Animalia
- Phylum: Arthropoda
- Clade: Pancrustacea
- Class: Insecta
- Order: Lepidoptera
- Family: Geometridae
- Genus: Cyclophora
- Species: C. anaisaria

Binomial name
- Cyclophora anaisaria (Schaus, 1901)

Synonyms
- Craspedia anaisaria Schaus, 1901

Species of moth

Cyclophora anaisaria is a moth in the family Geometridae. It is found in south-eastern Brazil.
