= Cyclophora inaequalis =

Scientific classification
- Kingdom: Animalia
- Phylum: Arthropoda
- Clade: Pancrustacea
- Class: Insecta
- Order: Lepidoptera
- Family: Geometridae
- Genus: Cyclophora
- Species: C. inaequalis

Binomial name
- Cyclophora inaequalis (Warren, 1902)

Synonyms
- Pisoraca inaequalis Warren, 1902

Species of moth

Cyclophora inaequalis is a moth in the family Geometridae. It is found in Zambia.
