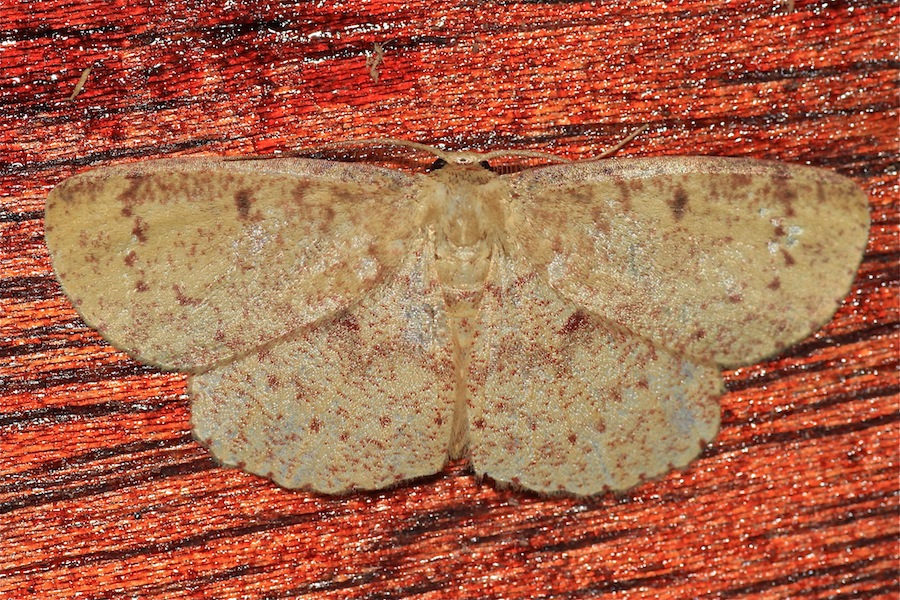
- Bornean specimen from Trusmadi hill dipterocarp forest

Scientific classification
- Kingdom: Animalia
- Phylum: Arthropoda
- Clade: Pancrustacea
- Class: Insecta
- Order: Lepidoptera
- Family: Geometridae
- Genus: Cyclophora
- Species: C. rotundata

Binomial name
- Cyclophora rotundata Warren, 1897

Synonyms
- Anisodes rotundata Warren, 1897; Pachythalia rotundata Warren, 1897

= Cyclophora rotundata =

Species of moth

Cyclophora rotundata is a moth in the family Geometridae. Now the species is treated as Anisodes rotundata (Warren, 1897). It is found on Peninsular Malaysia, Sumatra and Borneo. The habitat consists of lowland forests.
