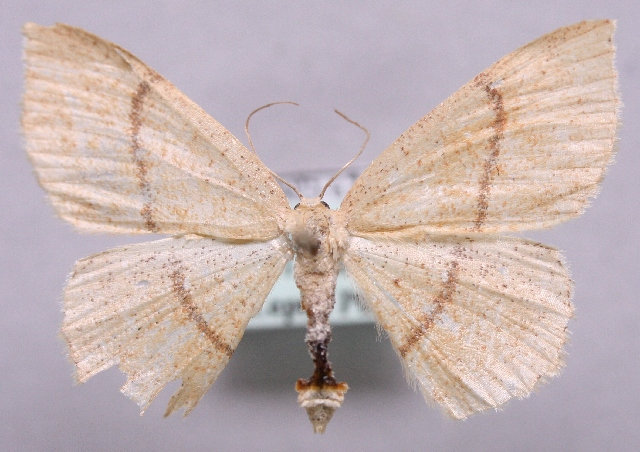

Scientific classification
- Kingdom: Animalia
- Phylum: Arthropoda
- Clade: Pancrustacea
- Class: Insecta
- Order: Lepidoptera
- Family: Geometridae
- Genus: Cyclophora
- Species: C. quercimontaria

Binomial name
- Cyclophora quercimontaria (Bastelberger, 1897)

Synonyms
- Zonosoma quercimontaria Bastelberger, 1897; Cosymbia quercimontaria elbursica Prout, 1935; Cyclophora nigrosparsaria Heydemann, 1938; Cyclophora communifasciata Lempke, 1949; Cyclophora uniformata Lempke, 1949; Cyclophora quercimontaria nigrosparsaria Scoble, 1999; Cyclophora quercimontaria privataria Scoble, 1999; Cyclophora querciporata Urbahn, 1939

= Cyclophora quercimontaria =

Species of moth

Cyclophora quercimontaria is a moth of the family Geometridae. It is found from southern Scandinavia to central and southern Europe and from western Russia to the Caucasus, northern Iran and the northern parts of Asia Minor.

The wingspan is 24–28 mm. Adults are on wing from the end of April to May in one generation per year.

The larvae feed on Quercus species. The species overwinters as a pupa attached to a branch or twig of the host plant.
