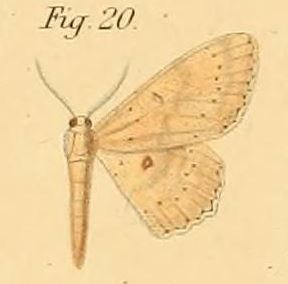

Scientific classification
- Kingdom: Animalia
- Phylum: Arthropoda
- Clade: Pancrustacea
- Class: Insecta
- Order: Lepidoptera
- Family: Geometridae
- Genus: Cyclophora
- Species: C. lyciscaria

Binomial name
- Cyclophora lyciscaria (Guenee, 1858)

Synonyms
- Ephyra lyciscaria Guenee, 1858; Anisodes lyciscaria; Pisoraca bitactata Walker, 1862; Anisodes deremptaria Walker, 1863; Ephyra coecaria Guenée, 1858 (not Herrich-Schaffer 1870)

= Cyclophora lyciscaria =

Species of moth

Cyclophora lyciscaria is a moth in the family Geometridae. It is found in Guinea, Kenya, La Réunion, Madagascar and South Africa.
