= Cyclophora connexa =

Scientific classification
- Kingdom: Animalia
- Phylum: Arthropoda
- Clade: Pancrustacea
- Class: Insecta
- Order: Lepidoptera
- Family: Geometridae
- Genus: Cyclophora
- Species: C. connexa

Binomial name
- Cyclophora connexa (Prout, 1932)

Synonyms
- Anisodes connexa Prout, 1932; Anisodes radiata Warren, 1907

Species of moth

Cyclophora connexa is a moth in the family Geometridae. It is found in Peru.
