= Cyclophora mesotoma =

Scientific classification
- Kingdom: Animalia
- Phylum: Arthropoda
- Clade: Pancrustacea
- Class: Insecta
- Order: Lepidoptera
- Family: Geometridae
- Genus: Cyclophora
- Species: C. mesotoma

Binomial name
- Cyclophora mesotoma (Prout, 1920)

Synonyms
- Pisoraca mesotoma Prout, 1920; Anisodes mesotoma

Species of moth

Cyclophora mesotoma is a moth in the family Geometridae. It is found in China (Hainan).
