= Cyclophora benjamini =

Scientific classification
- Kingdom: Animalia
- Phylum: Arthropoda
- Clade: Pancrustacea
- Class: Insecta
- Order: Lepidoptera
- Family: Geometridae
- Genus: Cyclophora
- Species: C. benjamini

Binomial name
- Cyclophora benjamini (Prout, 1936)

Synonyms
- Cosymbia benjamini Prout, 1936

Species of moth

Cyclophora benjamini is a moth in the family Geometridae. It is found in south-eastern North America, including Florida, Georgia and Mississippi.

The wingspan is about 21 mm.
