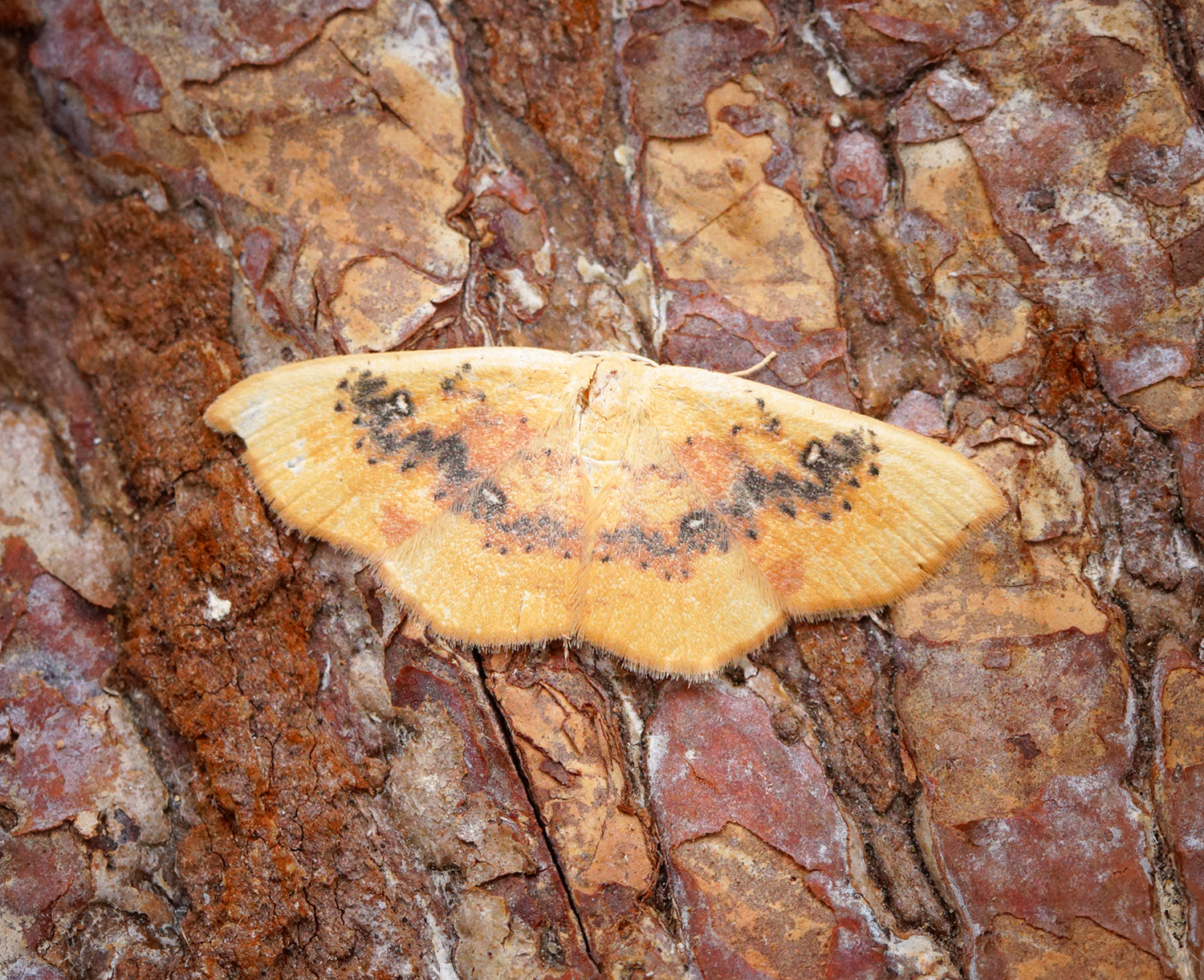

Scientific classification
- Kingdom: Animalia
- Phylum: Arthropoda
- Class: Insecta
- Order: Lepidoptera
- Family: Geometridae
- Genus: Cyclophora
- Species: C. lennigiaria

Binomial name
- Cyclophora lennigiaria (Fuchs, 1883)

Synonyms
- Zonosoma lennigiaria Fuchs 1883; Ephyra albiocellaria var. occidentalis Lucas, 1932; Cyclophora aestiva Fuchs, 1883; Cyclophora suppupillaria Fuchs, 1883

= Cyclophora lennigiaria =

Species of moth

Cyclophora lennigiaria is a moth in the family Geometridae. It is found in south-western Europe, north to southern France and western Germany, as well as in Morocco.

The wingspan is 28–34 mm. Adults are on wing from April to June and again from July to September in two generations per year.

The larvae feed on Acer monspessulanum. The species overwinters in the pupal stage.

== Subspecies ==
- Cyclophora lennigiaria lennigiaria (south-western Europe, southern France, western Germany)
- Cyclophora lennigiaria mauretanica Reisser, 1934 (Morocco)
