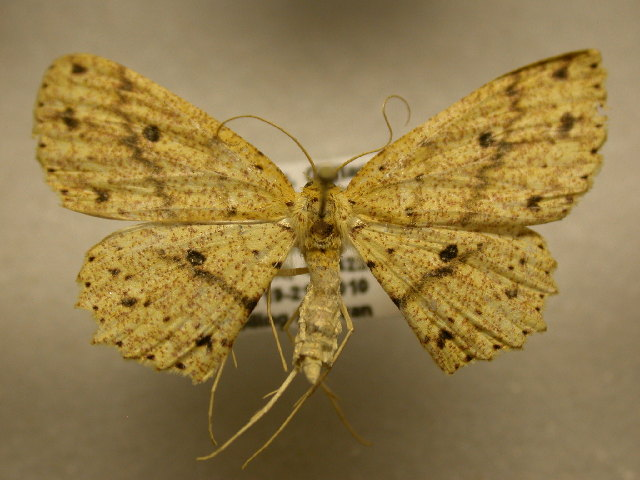

Scientific classification
- Kingdom: Animalia
- Phylum: Arthropoda
- Clade: Pancrustacea
- Class: Insecta
- Order: Lepidoptera
- Family: Geometridae
- Genus: Cyclophora
- Species: C. silas

Binomial name
- Cyclophora silas (Schaus, 1912)

Synonyms
- Anisodes silas Schaus, 1912

= Cyclophora silas =

Species of moth

Cyclophora silas is a moth in the family Geometridae first described by William Schaus in 1912. It is found in Costa Rica.
