= Cyclophora sympathica =

Scientific classification
- Kingdom: Animalia
- Phylum: Arthropoda
- Clade: Pancrustacea
- Class: Insecta
- Order: Lepidoptera
- Family: Geometridae
- Genus: Cyclophora
- Species: C. sympathica

Binomial name
- Cyclophora sympathica (Alphéraky, 1883)

Synonyms
- Timandra sympathica Alphéraky, 1883; Zonosoma albilineata Staudinger, 1892

Species of moth

Cyclophora sympathica is a moth in the family Geometridae. It is found in Afghanistan.
