= Cyclophora auricosta =

Scientific classification
- Kingdom: Animalia
- Phylum: Arthropoda
- Clade: Pancrustacea
- Class: Insecta
- Order: Lepidoptera
- Family: Geometridae
- Genus: Cyclophora
- Species: C. auricosta

Binomial name
- Cyclophora auricosta (Prout, 1916)

Synonyms
- Ptochophyle auricosta Prout, 1916; Anisodes auricosta

Species of moth

Cyclophora auricosta is a moth in the family Geometridae. It is found in New Guinea.
