= Cyclophora poeciloptera =

Scientific classification
- Kingdom: Animalia
- Phylum: Arthropoda
- Clade: Pancrustacea
- Class: Insecta
- Order: Lepidoptera
- Family: Geometridae
- Genus: Cyclophora
- Species: C. poeciloptera

Binomial name
- Cyclophora poeciloptera (Prout, 1920)

Synonyms
- Pisoraca poeciloptera Prout, 1920

Species of moth

Cyclophora poeciloptera is a moth in the family Geometridae. It is found in Ivory Coast and Nigeria.
