= Cyclophora semirosea =

Scientific classification
- Kingdom: Animalia
- Phylum: Arthropoda
- Clade: Pancrustacea
- Class: Insecta
- Order: Lepidoptera
- Family: Geometridae
- Genus: Cyclophora
- Species: C. semirosea

Binomial name
- Cyclophora semirosea (Butler, 1882)

Synonyms
- Ephyra semirosea Butler, 1882; Ephyra semirosea ab. notigera Butler, 1882

Species of moth

Cyclophora semirosea is a moth in the family Geometridae. It is found in Chile.
