= Cyclophora nigrescens =

Scientific classification
- Kingdom: Animalia
- Phylum: Arthropoda
- Clade: Pancrustacea
- Class: Insecta
- Order: Lepidoptera
- Family: Geometridae
- Genus: Cyclophora
- Species: C. nigrescens

Binomial name
- Cyclophora nigrescens Herbulot, 1993

Species of moth

Cyclophora nigrescens is a moth in the family Geometridae. It is found in Peru.

The larvae feed on Myrciaria dubia.
