= Cyclophora staudei =

Scientific classification
- Kingdom: Animalia
- Phylum: Arthropoda
- Class: Insecta
- Order: Lepidoptera
- Family: Geometridae
- Genus: Cyclophora
- Species: C. staudei

Binomial name
- Cyclophora staudei Hausmann, 2006

Species of moth

Cyclophora staudei is a moth in the family Geometridae. It is found in Yemen.
