= Cyclophora subrosea =

Scientific classification
- Kingdom: Animalia
- Phylum: Arthropoda
- Clade: Pancrustacea
- Class: Insecta
- Order: Lepidoptera
- Family: Geometridae
- Genus: Cyclophora
- Species: C. subrosea

Binomial name
- Cyclophora subrosea (Warren, 1906)

Synonyms
- Perixera subrosea Warren, 1906

Species of moth

Cyclophora subrosea is a moth in the family Geometridae. It is found in New Guinea and on Seram.
