= Cyclophora landanata =

Scientific classification
- Kingdom: Animalia
- Phylum: Arthropoda
- Clade: Pancrustacea
- Class: Insecta
- Order: Lepidoptera
- Family: Geometridae
- Genus: Cyclophora
- Species: C. landanata

Binomial name
- Cyclophora landanata (Mabille, 1898)

Synonyms
- Anisodes landanata Mabille, 1898

Species of moth

Cyclophora landanata is a moth in the family Geometridae. It is found in Angola.
