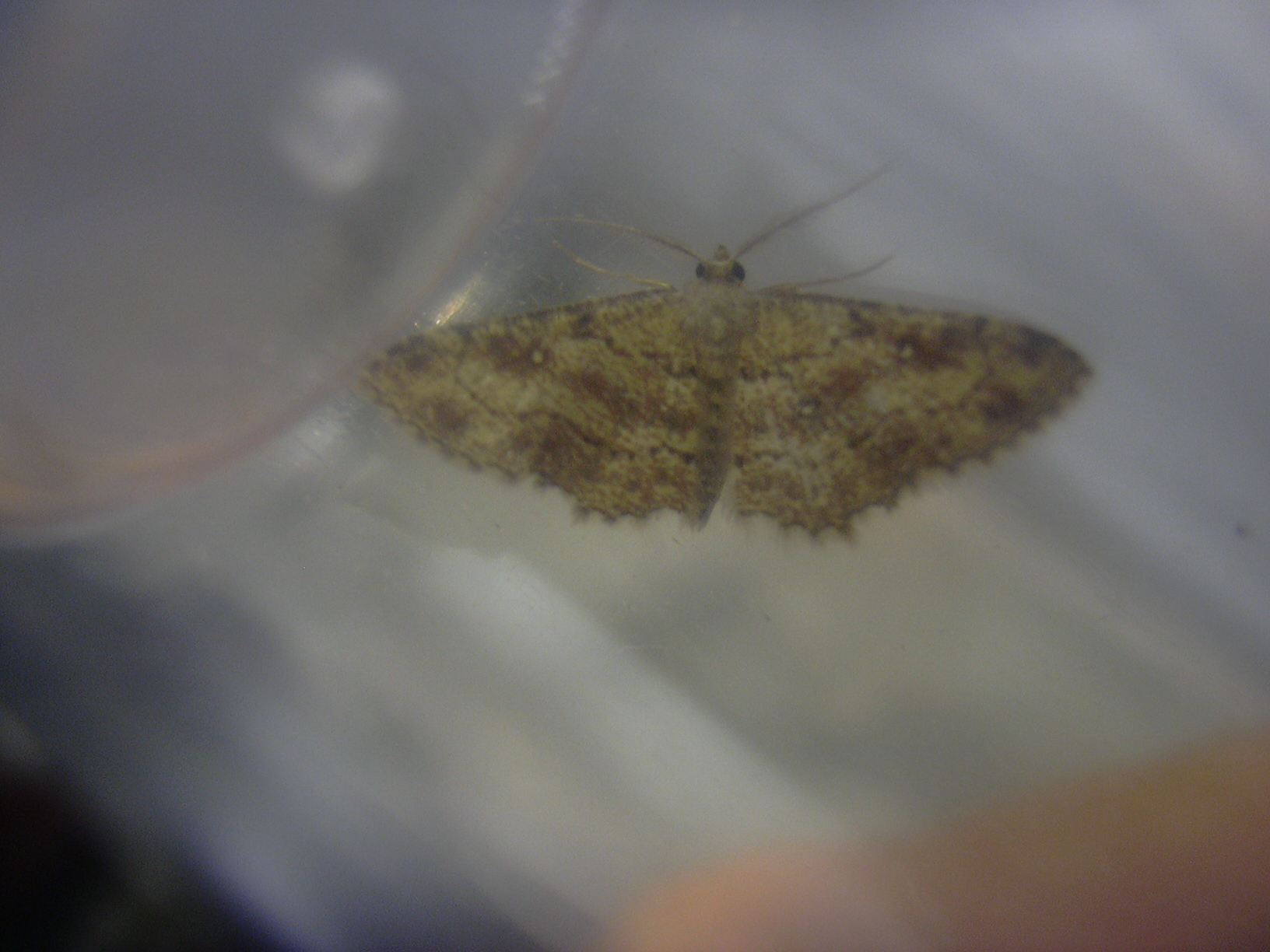

Scientific classification
- Kingdom: Animalia
- Phylum: Arthropoda
- Clade: Pancrustacea
- Class: Insecta
- Order: Lepidoptera
- Family: Geometridae
- Genus: Cyclophora
- Species: C. nanaria

Binomial name
- Cyclophora nanaria (Walker, 1861)

Synonyms
- Ephyra nanaria Walker, 1861; Zonosoma nanularia Herrich-Schäffer, 1870; Cyclophora nanularia (Herrich-Schäffer, 1870); Euephyra serrulata Packard, 1873; Cyclophora serrulata (Packard, 1873); Ephyra obscura Druce, 1898; Cyclophora obscura (Druce, 1898)

= Cyclophora nanaria =

Species of moth

Cyclophora nanaria, the dwarf tawny wave, is a moth of the family Geometridae. The species was first described by Francis Walker in 1861. It is found in the US from California to Texas and from New Jersey to Florida west along the Gulf Coast. The range extends south through Dominica and Jamaica to Argentina. It is an introduced species in Hawaii.

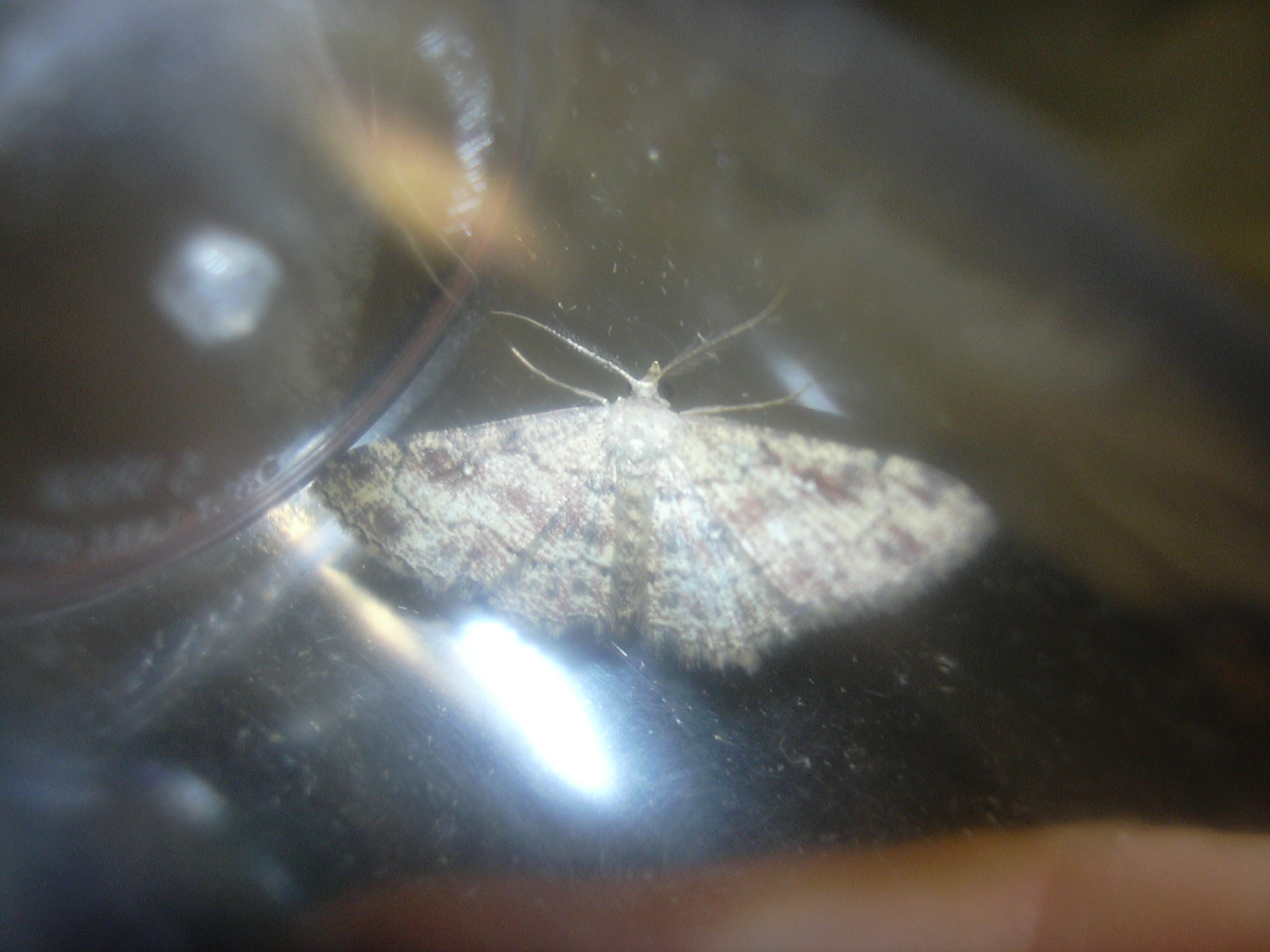

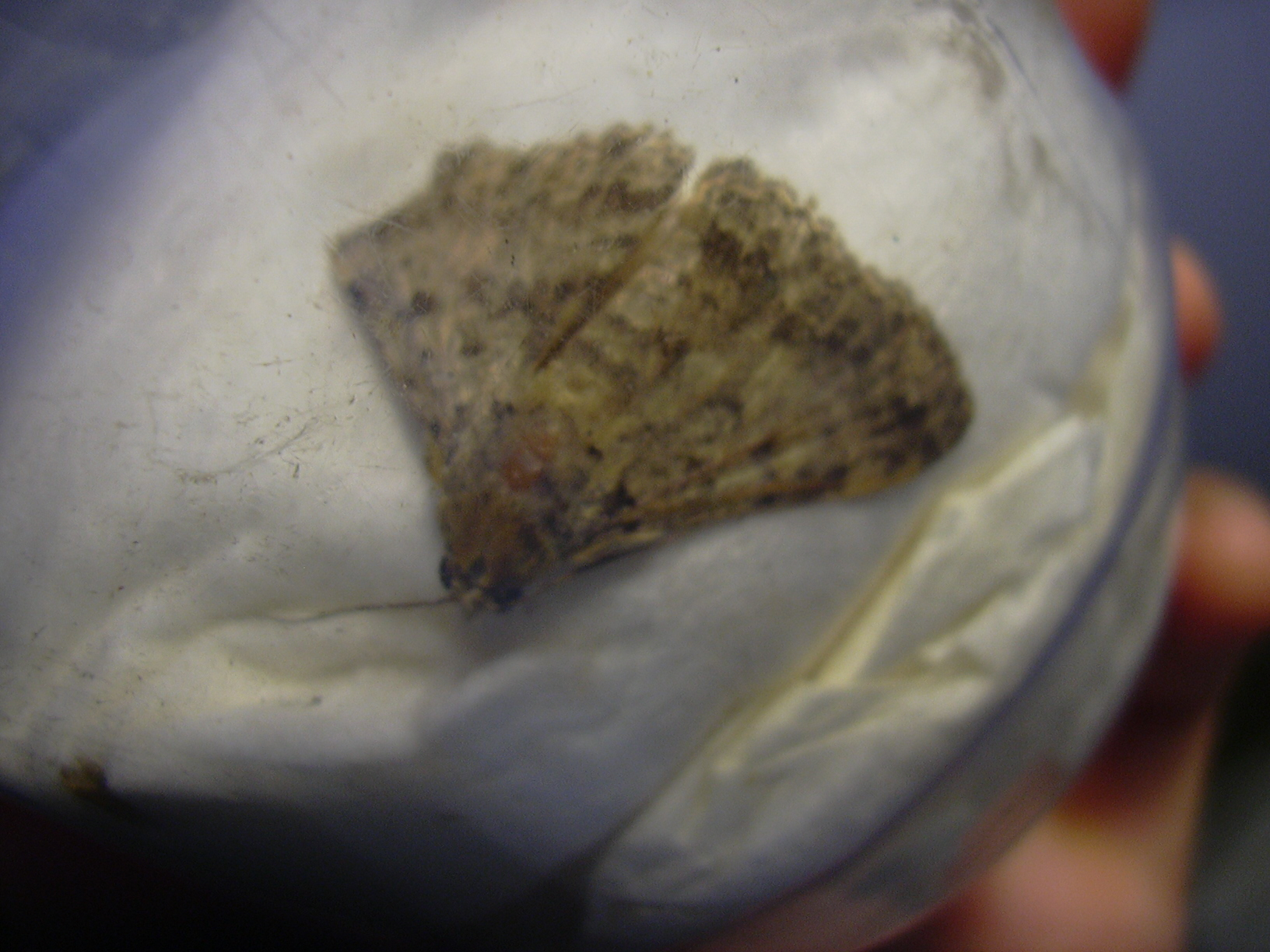

The wingspan is about 16 mm.
