= Cyclophora carsoni =

Scientific classification
- Kingdom: Animalia
- Phylum: Arthropoda
- Clade: Pancrustacea
- Class: Insecta
- Order: Lepidoptera
- Family: Geometridae
- Genus: Cyclophora
- Species: C. carsoni

Binomial name
- Cyclophora carsoni Holloway, 1997

Species of moth

Cyclophora carsoni is a moth in the family Geometridae. It is found on Borneo. The habitat consists of montane forests at altitudes between 1,200 and 2,600 meters.

The length of the forewings is 13–15 mm.
