= Cyclophora metamorpha =

Scientific classification
- Kingdom: Animalia
- Phylum: Arthropoda
- Clade: Pancrustacea
- Class: Insecta
- Order: Lepidoptera
- Family: Geometridae
- Genus: Cyclophora
- Species: C. metamorpha

Binomial name
- Cyclophora metamorpha (Prout, 1925)

Synonyms
- Anisodes metamorpha Prout, 1925

Species of moth

Cyclophora metamorpha is a moth in the family Geometridae. It is found in Madagascar.
