= Cyclophora circummaculata =

Scientific classification
- Kingdom: Animalia
- Phylum: Arthropoda
- Clade: Pancrustacea
- Class: Insecta
- Order: Lepidoptera
- Family: Geometridae
- Genus: Cyclophora
- Species: C. circummaculata

Binomial name
- Cyclophora circummaculata (Holloway, 1976)

Synonyms
- Anisodes circummaculata Holloway, 1976

Species of moth

Cyclophora circummaculata is a moth in the family Geometridae. It is found on Borneo and Peninsular Malaysia. The habitat consists of upper montane forests.
