= Cyclophora calama =

Scientific classification
- Kingdom: Animalia
- Phylum: Arthropoda
- Clade: Pancrustacea
- Class: Insecta
- Order: Lepidoptera
- Family: Geometridae
- Genus: Cyclophora
- Species: C. calama

Binomial name
- Cyclophora calama (Prout, 1920)

Synonyms
- Pisoraca calama Prout, 1920; Anisodes calama

Species of moth

Cyclophora calama is a moth in the family Geometridae. It is found in the Madeira River basin in South America.
