= Cyclophora aspera =

Scientific classification
- Kingdom: Animalia
- Phylum: Arthropoda
- Clade: Pancrustacea
- Class: Insecta
- Order: Lepidoptera
- Family: Geometridae
- Genus: Cyclophora
- Species: C. aspera

Binomial name
- Cyclophora aspera (Warren, 1901)

Synonyms
- Anisodes aspera Warren, 1901

Species of moth

Cyclophora aspera is a moth in the family Geometridae. It is found in Colombia.
