= Cyclophora coenosata =

Scientific classification
- Kingdom: Animalia
- Phylum: Arthropoda
- Clade: Pancrustacea
- Class: Insecta
- Order: Lepidoptera
- Family: Geometridae
- Genus: Cyclophora
- Species: C. coenosata

Binomial name
- Cyclophora coenosata (Warren, 1907)

Synonyms
- Anisodes coenosata Warren, 1907

Species of moth

Cyclophora coenosata is a moth in the family Geometridae. It is found in Peru.
