= Cyclophora castraria =

Scientific classification
- Kingdom: Animalia
- Phylum: Arthropoda
- Clade: Pancrustacea
- Class: Insecta
- Order: Lepidoptera
- Family: Geometridae
- Genus: Cyclophora
- Species: C. castraria

Binomial name
- Cyclophora castraria (Schaus, 1901)

Synonyms
- Anisodes castraria Schaus, 1901

Species of moth

Cyclophora castraria is a moth in the family Geometridae. It is found in Brazil.
