= Cyclophora aequalipunctata =

Scientific classification
- Kingdom: Animalia
- Phylum: Arthropoda
- Clade: Pancrustacea
- Class: Insecta
- Order: Lepidoptera
- Family: Geometridae
- Genus: Cyclophora
- Species: C. aequalipunctata

Binomial name
- Cyclophora aequalipunctata (Dognin, 1901)

Synonyms
- Anisodes aequalipunctata Dognin, 1901; Anisodes latifasciata Warren, 1907; Anisodes latifasciata ab. pallescens Prout, 1936

Species of moth

Cyclophora aequalipunctata is a moth in the family Geometridae. It is found in Ecuador and Peru.

== Subspecies ==
- Cyclophora aequalipunctata aequalipunctata (Ecuador)
- Cyclophora aequalipunctata latifasciata Warren, 1907 (Peru)
