= Cyclophora angeronaria =

Scientific classification
- Kingdom: Animalia
- Phylum: Arthropoda
- Clade: Pancrustacea
- Class: Insecta
- Order: Lepidoptera
- Family: Geometridae
- Genus: Cyclophora
- Species: C. angeronaria

Binomial name
- Cyclophora angeronaria (Warren, 1895)

Synonyms
- Cosymbia angeronaria Warren, 1895

Species of moth

Cyclophora angeronaria is a moth in the family Geometridae. It is found in south-eastern Brazil.
