= Cyclophora bipunctata =

Scientific classification
- Kingdom: Animalia
- Phylum: Arthropoda
- Class: Insecta
- Order: Lepidoptera
- Family: Geometridae
- Genus: Cyclophora
- Species: C. bipunctata

Binomial name
- Cyclophora bipunctata (Warren, 1904)

Synonyms
- Anisodes bipunctata Warren, 1904

Species of moth

Cyclophora bipunctata is a moth in the family Geometridae. It is found in Peru.
