= Cyclophora ampligutta =

Scientific classification
- Kingdom: Animalia
- Phylum: Arthropoda
- Clade: Pancrustacea
- Class: Insecta
- Order: Lepidoptera
- Family: Geometridae
- Genus: Cyclophora
- Species: C. ampligutta

Binomial name
- Cyclophora ampligutta (Warren, 1896)

Synonyms
- Perixera ampligutta Warren, 1896; Anisodes ampligutta

Species of moth

Cyclophora ampligutta is a moth in the family Geometridae. It is found in New Guinea and Australia.
