= Cyclophora flavissima =

Scientific classification
- Kingdom: Animalia
- Phylum: Arthropoda
- Clade: Pancrustacea
- Class: Insecta
- Order: Lepidoptera
- Family: Geometridae
- Genus: Cyclophora
- Species: C. flavissima

Binomial name
- Cyclophora flavissima (Warren, 1907)

Synonyms
- Perixera flavissima Warren, 1907; Anisodes flavissima

Species of moth

Cyclophora flavissima is a moth in the family Geometridae. It is found on Borneo, the southern Moluccas and in New Guinea.
