= Cyclophora ariadne =

Scientific classification
- Kingdom: Animalia
- Phylum: Arthropoda
- Clade: Pancrustacea
- Class: Insecta
- Order: Lepidoptera
- Family: Geometridae
- Genus: Cyclophora
- Species: C. ariadne

Binomial name
- Cyclophora ariadne (Reisser, 1939)

Synonyms
- Codonia ariadne Reisser, 1939

Species of moth

Cyclophora ariadne is a moth in the family Geometridae. It was described by Hans Reisser in 1939. It is found on Crete.

The wingspan is 18–26 mm. The ground colour is ochreous yellow. The larvae feed on Platanus orientalis.
