= Cyclophora dewitzi =

Scientific classification
- Kingdom: Animalia
- Phylum: Arthropoda
- Clade: Pancrustacea
- Class: Insecta
- Order: Lepidoptera
- Family: Geometridae
- Genus: Cyclophora
- Species: C. dewitzi

Binomial name
- Cyclophora dewitzi (Prout, 1920)

Synonyms
- Anisodes dewitzi Prout, 1920

Species of moth

Cyclophora dewitzi is a moth in the family Geometridae. It is found in the Democratic Republic of Congo, Gabon, Ivory Coast and Nigeria.
