= Cyclophora lateritica =

Scientific classification
- Kingdom: Animalia
- Phylum: Arthropoda
- Clade: Pancrustacea
- Class: Insecta
- Order: Lepidoptera
- Family: Geometridae
- Genus: Cyclophora
- Species: C. lateritica

Binomial name
- Cyclophora lateritica (Holloway, 1979)

Synonyms
- Anisodes lateritica Holloway, 1979

Species of moth

Cyclophora lateritica is a moth in the family Geometridae. It is found in New Caledonia.

The larvae have been reared on Codia species.
