= Cyclophora coecaria =

Scientific classification
- Kingdom: Animalia
- Phylum: Arthropoda
- Clade: Pancrustacea
- Class: Insecta
- Order: Lepidoptera
- Family: Geometridae
- Genus: Cyclophora
- Species: C. coecaria

Binomial name
- Cyclophora coecaria (Herrich-Schaffer, 1870)

Synonyms
- Zonosoma coecaria Herrich-Schaffer, 1870; Craspedia bilinearia Schaus, 1901; Cosymbia obcoecaria Prout, 1934

Species of moth

Cyclophora coecaria is a moth in the family Geometridae. It is found from Venezuela to Mexico.
