= Cyclophora posticamplum =

Scientific classification
- Kingdom: Animalia
- Phylum: Arthropoda
- Clade: Pancrustacea
- Class: Insecta
- Order: Lepidoptera
- Family: Geometridae
- Genus: Cyclophora
- Species: C. posticamplum

Binomial name
- Cyclophora posticamplum (C. Swinhoe, 1892)

Synonyms
- Streptopteron posticamplum C. Swinhoe, 1892; Anisodes posticamplum; Anisodes posticamplum expunctor Prout, 1932

Species of moth

Cyclophora posticamplum is a moth in the family Geometridae first described by Charles Swinhoe in 1892. It is found in the north-eastern Himalayas and on Borneo and Peninsular Malaysia.

== Subspecies ==
- Cyclophora posticamplum posticamplum (north-eastern Himalayas, Peninsular Malaysia)
- Cyclophora posticamplum expunctor (Prout, 1932) (Borneo)
