= Cyclophora lautokensis =

Scientific classification
- Kingdom: Animalia
- Phylum: Arthropoda
- Clade: Pancrustacea
- Class: Insecta
- Order: Lepidoptera
- Family: Geometridae
- Genus: Cyclophora
- Species: C. lautokensis

Binomial name
- Cyclophora lautokensis (Prout, 1929)

Synonyms
- Anisodes lautokensis Prout, 1929

Species of moth

Cyclophora lautokensis is a moth in the family Geometridae. It is found on Fiji.
