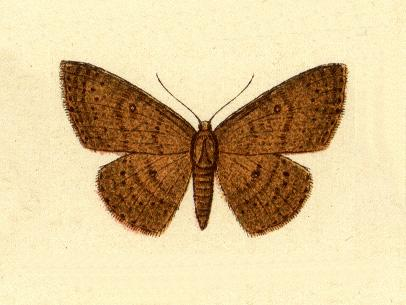

Scientific classification
- Kingdom: Animalia
- Phylum: Arthropoda
- Clade: Pancrustacea
- Class: Insecta
- Order: Lepidoptera
- Family: Geometridae
- Genus: Cyclophora
- Species: C. subpallida

Binomial name
- Cyclophora subpallida (Warren, 1900)

Synonyms
- Anisodes subpallida Warren, 1900; Anisodes potreria Warren, 1906; Anisodes stollaria Schaus, 1901; Anisodes tenera Warren, 1900; Hammaptera tenera

= Cyclophora subpallida =

Species of moth

Cyclophora subpallida is a moth of the family Geometridae. It is found in South America and Central America and on the Antilles.
