= Cyclophora argyromyces =

Scientific classification
- Kingdom: Animalia
- Phylum: Arthropoda
- Clade: Pancrustacea
- Class: Insecta
- Order: Lepidoptera
- Family: Geometridae
- Genus: Cyclophora
- Species: C. argyromyces

Binomial name
- Cyclophora argyromyces (Prout, 1938)

Synonyms
- Anisodes argyromyces Prout, 1938

Species of moth

Cyclophora argyromyces is a moth in the family Geometridae first described by Louis Beethoven Prout in 1938. It is found in Colombia.
