= Cyclophora serveti =

Scientific classification
- Kingdom: Animalia
- Phylum: Arthropoda
- Clade: Pancrustacea
- Class: Insecta
- Order: Lepidoptera
- Family: Geometridae
- Genus: Cyclophora
- Species: C. serveti

Binomial name
- Cyclophora serveti Redondo & Gastón, 1999

Species of moth

Cyclophora serveti is a moth in the family Geometridae. It is found in Spain.
