= Cyclophora iners =

Scientific classification
- Kingdom: Animalia
- Phylum: Arthropoda
- Clade: Pancrustacea
- Class: Insecta
- Order: Lepidoptera
- Family: Geometridae
- Genus: Cyclophora
- Species: C. iners

Binomial name
- Cyclophora iners (Prout, 1920)

Synonyms
- Pisoraca iners Prout, 1920; Anisodes iners

Species of moth

Cyclophora iners is a moth in the family Geometridae. It is found in south-eastern Peru.
