= Cyclophora funginaria =

Scientific classification
- Kingdom: Animalia
- Phylum: Arthropoda
- Clade: Pancrustacea
- Class: Insecta
- Order: Lepidoptera
- Family: Geometridae
- Genus: Cyclophora
- Species: C. funginaria

Binomial name
- Cyclophora funginaria (Guenee, 1858)

Synonyms
- Ephyra funginaria Guenee, 1858

Species of moth

Cyclophora funginaria is a moth in the family Geometridae. The type locality is unknown.
