= Cyclophora difficilis =

Scientific classification
- Kingdom: Animalia
- Phylum: Arthropoda
- Clade: Pancrustacea
- Class: Insecta
- Order: Lepidoptera
- Family: Geometridae
- Genus: Cyclophora
- Species: C. difficilis

Binomial name
- Cyclophora difficilis (Prout, 1920)

Synonyms
- Pisoraca difficilis Prout, 1920; Anisodes difficilis

Species of moth

Cyclophora difficilis is a moth in the family Geometridae. It is found in the Amazon rainforest.
