= Cyclophora apogona =

Scientific classification
- Kingdom: Animalia
- Phylum: Arthropoda
- Clade: Pancrustacea
- Class: Insecta
- Order: Lepidoptera
- Family: Geometridae
- Genus: Cyclophora
- Species: C. apogona

Binomial name
- Cyclophora apogona (Prout, 1938)

Synonyms
- Anisodes apogona Prout, 1938

Species of moth

Cyclophora apogona is a moth in the family Geometridae. It is found in southern India.
