= Cyclophora leonaria =

Scientific classification
- Kingdom: Animalia
- Phylum: Arthropoda
- Clade: Pancrustacea
- Class: Insecta
- Order: Lepidoptera
- Family: Geometridae
- Genus: Cyclophora
- Species: C. leonaria

Binomial name
- Cyclophora leonaria (Walker, 1861)

Synonyms
- Ephyra leonaria Walker, 1861

Species of moth

Cyclophora leonaria is a moth in the family Geometridae. It is found in the Democratic Republic of Congo, Nigeria, Sierra Leone and on São Tomé.
