= Cyclophora dispergaria =

Scientific classification
- Kingdom: Animalia
- Phylum: Arthropoda
- Clade: Pancrustacea
- Class: Insecta
- Order: Lepidoptera
- Family: Geometridae
- Genus: Cyclophora
- Species: C. dispergaria

Binomial name
- Cyclophora dispergaria (Moschler, 1882)

Synonyms
- Zonosoma dispergaria Moschler, 1882; Anisodes dispergaria

Species of moth

Cyclophora dispergaria is a moth in the family Geometridae. It is found in Suriname.
