= Cyclophora acampes =

Scientific classification
- Kingdom: Animalia
- Phylum: Arthropoda
- Clade: Pancrustacea
- Class: Insecta
- Order: Lepidoptera
- Family: Geometridae
- Genus: Cyclophora
- Species: C. acampes

Binomial name
- Cyclophora acampes (Prout, 1938)

Synonyms
- Anisodes acampes Prout, 1938

Species of moth

Cyclophora acampes is a moth in the family Geometridae. It is found in Peru.
