= Cyclophora aguzata =

Scientific classification
- Kingdom: Animalia
- Phylum: Arthropoda
- Clade: Pancrustacea
- Class: Insecta
- Order: Lepidoptera
- Family: Geometridae
- Genus: Cyclophora
- Species: C. aguzata

Binomial name
- Cyclophora aguzata (Dognin, 1893)

Synonyms
- Ephyra aguzata Dognin, 1893; Anisodes aguzata

Species of moth

Cyclophora aguzata is a moth in the family Geometridae. It is found in Ecuador.
