= Cyclophora sanguinata =

Scientific classification
- Kingdom: Animalia
- Phylum: Arthropoda
- Clade: Pancrustacea
- Class: Insecta
- Order: Lepidoptera
- Family: Geometridae
- Genus: Cyclophora
- Species: C. sanguinata

Binomial name
- Cyclophora sanguinata (Warren, 1904)

Synonyms
- Pisoraca sanguinata Warren, 1904

Species of moth

Cyclophora sanguinata is a moth in the family Geometridae. It is found in South Africa.
