= Cyclophora hirtipalpis =

Scientific classification
- Kingdom: Animalia
- Phylum: Arthropoda
- Clade: Pancrustacea
- Class: Insecta
- Order: Lepidoptera
- Family: Geometridae
- Genus: Cyclophora
- Species: C. hirtipalpis

Binomial name
- Cyclophora hirtipalpis (Prout, 1932)

Synonyms
- Anisodes hirtipalpis Prout, 1932

Species of moth

Cyclophora hirtipalpis is a moth in the family Geometridae. It is found on Borneo.
