= Cyclophora carolina =

Scientific classification
- Kingdom: Animalia
- Phylum: Arthropoda
- Clade: Pancrustacea
- Class: Insecta
- Order: Lepidoptera
- Family: Geometridae
- Genus: Cyclophora
- Species: C. carolina

Binomial name
- Cyclophora carolina (E. D. Jones, 1921)

Synonyms
- Anisodes carolina E. D. Jones, 1921

Species of moth

Cyclophora carolina is a moth in the family Geometridae first described by E. Dukinfield Jones in 1921. It is found in Brazil.
