= Cyclophora mossi =

Scientific classification
- Kingdom: Animalia
- Phylum: Arthropoda
- Clade: Pancrustacea
- Class: Insecta
- Order: Lepidoptera
- Family: Geometridae
- Genus: Cyclophora
- Species: C. mossi

Binomial name
- Cyclophora mossi (Prout, 1936)

Synonyms
- Cosymbia mossi Prout, 1936

Species of moth

Cyclophora mossi is a moth in the family Geometridae. It is found in Brazil.
