= Cyclophora rufiplaga =

Scientific classification
- Kingdom: Animalia
- Phylum: Arthropoda
- Clade: Pancrustacea
- Class: Insecta
- Order: Lepidoptera
- Family: Geometridae
- Genus: Cyclophora
- Species: C. rufiplaga

Binomial name
- Cyclophora rufiplaga (Warren, 1903)

Synonyms
- Mesotrophe rufiplaga Warren, 1903; Anisodes rufiplaga; Anisodes rufiplaga ab. fasciata Warren, 1907; Anisodes rufiplaga ab. nigriversa Warren, 1907; Anisodes rufiplaga ab. stabilata Warren, 1906

Species of moth

Cyclophora rufiplaga is a moth in the family Geometridae. It is found in New Guinea.
