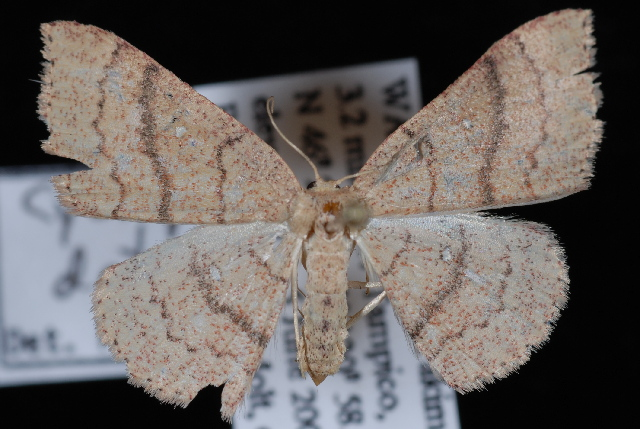

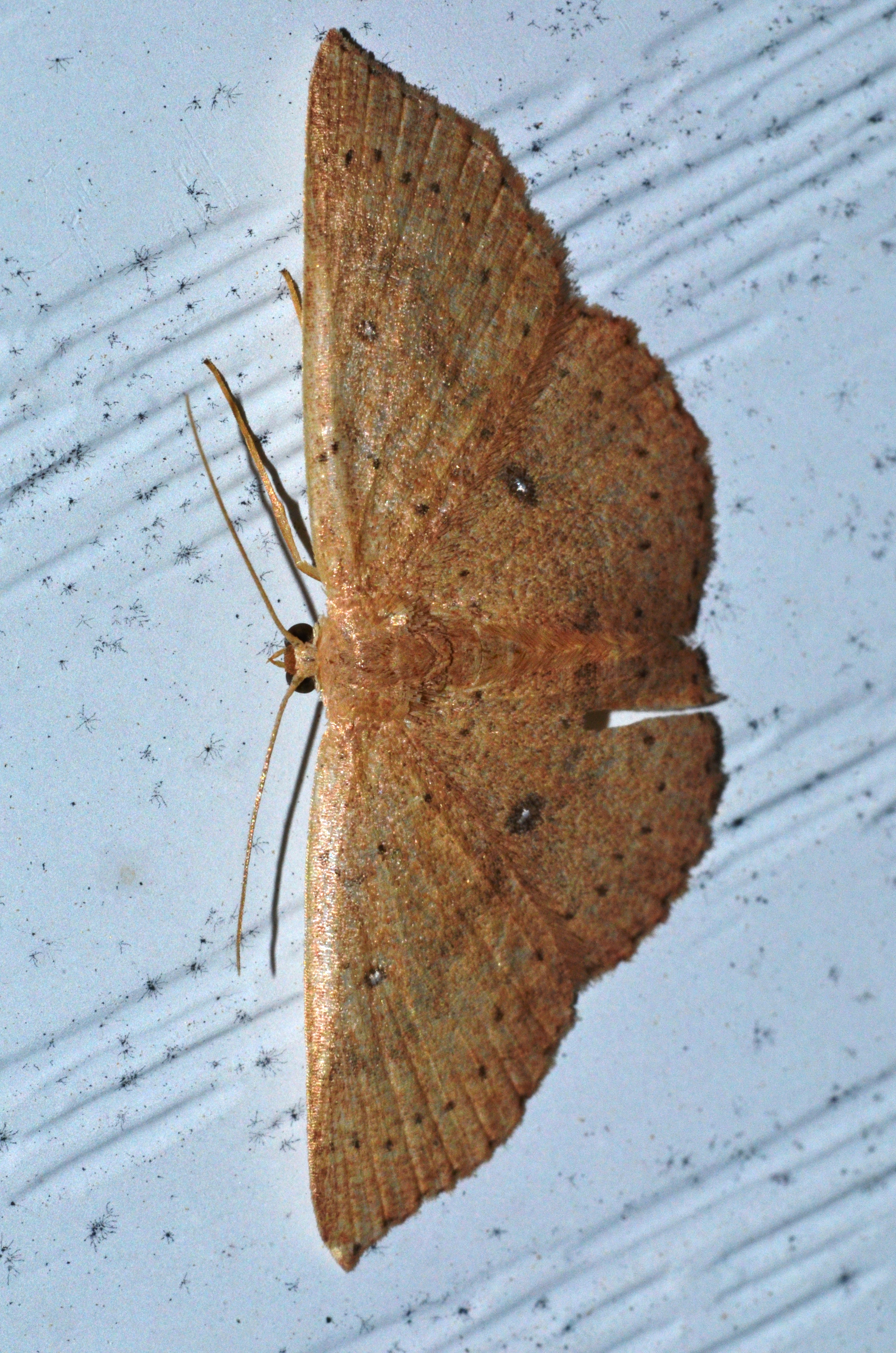

Scientific classification
- Kingdom: Animalia
- Phylum: Arthropoda
- Clade: Pancrustacea
- Class: Insecta
- Order: Lepidoptera
- Family: Geometridae
- Genus: Cyclophora
- Species: C. packardi

Binomial name
- Cyclophora packardi (Prout, 1936)

Synonyms
- Cosymbia packardi Prout, 1936

= Cyclophora packardi =

Species of moth

Cyclophora packardi, Packard's wave moth or Packard's wave, is a moth in the family Geometridae. It is found in North America, from Maine to Florida, west to Texas and north to Iowa and Ohio.

The wingspan is 17–23 mm. The wings are yellowish to orangish-brown. Adults are on wing from April/May to September.

The larvae possibly feed on Comptonia and/or Quercus species.
