= Cyclophora annularis =

Scientific classification
- Kingdom: Animalia
- Phylum: Arthropoda
- Clade: Pancrustacea
- Class: Insecta
- Order: Lepidoptera
- Family: Geometridae
- Genus: Cyclophora
- Species: C. annularis

Binomial name
- Cyclophora annularis (Felder & Rogenhofer, 1875)

Synonyms
- Anisodes annularis Felder & Rogenhofer, 1875

Species of moth

Cyclophora annularis is a moth in the family Geometridae. It is found in Brazil.
