= Cyclophora diplosticta =

Scientific classification
- Kingdom: Animalia
- Phylum: Arthropoda
- Clade: Pancrustacea
- Class: Insecta
- Order: Lepidoptera
- Family: Geometridae
- Genus: Cyclophora
- Species: C. diplosticta

Binomial name
- Cyclophora diplosticta (Prout, 1918)

Synonyms
- Pisoraca diplosticta Prout, 1918

Species of moth

Cyclophora diplosticta is a moth in the family Geometridae. It is found in Cameroon and Gabon.
