= Cyclophora eos =

Scientific classification
- Kingdom: Animalia
- Phylum: Arthropoda
- Clade: Pancrustacea
- Class: Insecta
- Order: Lepidoptera
- Family: Geometridae
- Genus: Cyclophora
- Species: C. eos

Binomial name
- Cyclophora eos (Prout, 1916)

Synonyms
- Ptochophyle eos Prout, 1916; Anisodes eos

Species of moth

Cyclophora eos is a moth in the family Geometridae. It is found in New Guinea.
