= Cyclophora lowi =

Scientific classification
- Kingdom: Animalia
- Phylum: Arthropoda
- Clade: Pancrustacea
- Class: Insecta
- Order: Lepidoptera
- Family: Geometridae
- Genus: Cyclophora
- Species: C. lowi

Binomial name
- Cyclophora lowi Holloway, 1997

Species of moth

Cyclophora lowi is a moth in the family Geometridae. It is found on Borneo. The habitat consists of upper montane forests.

The length of the forewings is 13–15 mm. Adults are uniform brick red with faint fasciation.
