= Cyclophora orboculata =

Scientific classification
- Kingdom: Animalia
- Phylum: Arthropoda
- Clade: Pancrustacea
- Class: Insecta
- Order: Lepidoptera
- Family: Geometridae
- Genus: Cyclophora
- Species: C. orboculata

Binomial name
- Cyclophora orboculata (Prout, 1922)

Synonyms
- Anisodes orboculata Prout, 1922

Species of moth

Cyclophora orboculata is a moth in the family Geometridae. It is found in Madagascar.
