= Cyclophora coxaria =

Scientific classification
- Kingdom: Animalia
- Phylum: Arthropoda
- Clade: Pancrustacea
- Class: Insecta
- Order: Lepidoptera
- Family: Geometridae
- Genus: Cyclophora
- Species: C. coxaria

Binomial name
- Cyclophora coxaria (Guenee, 1858)

Synonyms
- Anisodes coxaria Guenee, 1858

Species of moth

Cyclophora coxaria is a moth in the family Geometridae. It is found in French Guiana.
