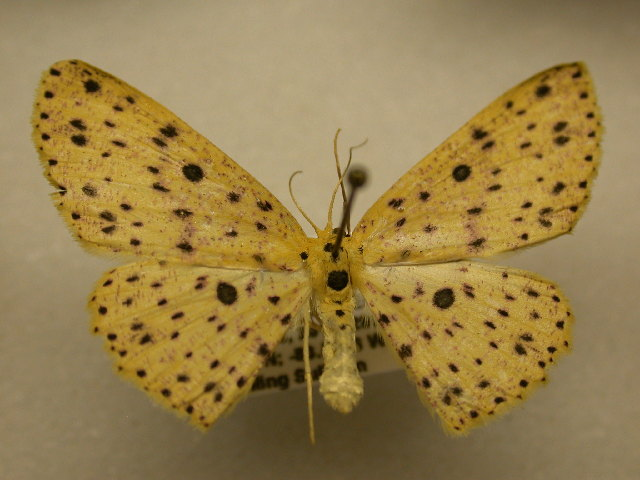

Scientific classification
- Kingdom: Animalia
- Phylum: Arthropoda
- Class: Insecta
- Order: Lepidoptera
- Family: Geometridae
- Genus: Cyclophora
- Species: C. prunelliaria

Binomial name
- Cyclophora prunelliaria (Herrich-Schaffer, 1855)

Synonyms
- Zonosoma prunelliaria Herrich-Schaffer, 1855

= Cyclophora prunelliaria =

Species of moth

Cyclophora prunelliaria is a moth in the family Geometridae. It is found in Venezuela.
