= Cyclophora acutaria =

Scientific classification
- Kingdom: Animalia
- Phylum: Arthropoda
- Clade: Pancrustacea
- Class: Insecta
- Order: Lepidoptera
- Family: Geometridae
- Genus: Cyclophora
- Species: C. acutaria

Binomial name
- Cyclophora acutaria (Walker, 1863)

Synonyms
- Ephyra acutaria Walker, 1863; Zonosoma conspicillaria Snellen, 1874

Species of moth

Cyclophora acutaria is a moth in the family Geometridae. It is found in Venezuela and Colombia.
