= Cyclophora anablemma =

Scientific classification
- Kingdom: Animalia
- Phylum: Arthropoda
- Clade: Pancrustacea
- Class: Insecta
- Order: Lepidoptera
- Family: Geometridae
- Genus: Cyclophora
- Species: C. anablemma

Binomial name
- Cyclophora anablemma (Prout, 1938)

Synonyms
- Anisodes anablemma Prout, 1938

Species of moth

Cyclophora anablemma is a moth in the family Geometridae. It is found in French Guiana.
