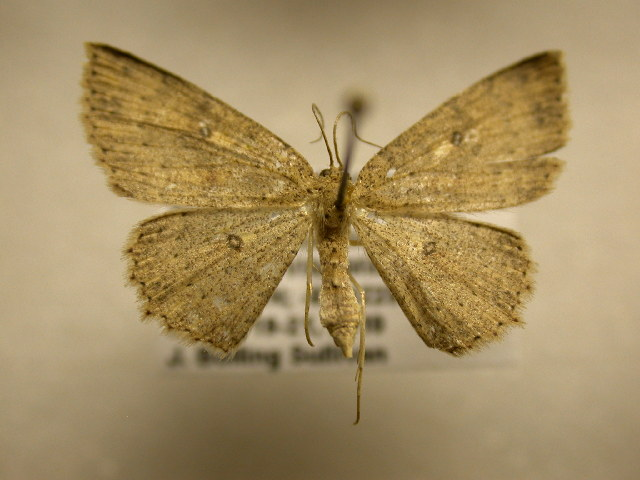

Scientific classification
- Kingdom: Animalia
- Phylum: Arthropoda
- Clade: Pancrustacea
- Class: Insecta
- Order: Lepidoptera
- Family: Geometridae
- Genus: Cyclophora
- Species: C. tharossa

Binomial name
- Cyclophora tharossa (H. Druce, 1899)

Synonyms
- Asthena tharossa H. Druce, 1899; Anisodes tharossa; Anisodes excavaria Schaus, 1901

= Cyclophora tharossa =

Species of moth

Cyclophora tharossa is a moth in the family Geometridae first described by Herbert Druce in 1899. It is found in Panama.
