= Cyclophora caducaria =

Scientific classification
- Kingdom: Animalia
- Phylum: Arthropoda
- Clade: Pancrustacea
- Class: Insecta
- Order: Lepidoptera
- Family: Geometridae
- Genus: Cyclophora
- Species: C. caducaria

Binomial name
- Cyclophora caducaria (Moschler, 1886)

Synonyms
- Anisodes caducaria Moschler, 1886

Species of moth

Cyclophora caducaria is a moth in the family Geometridae. It is found in Jamaica.
