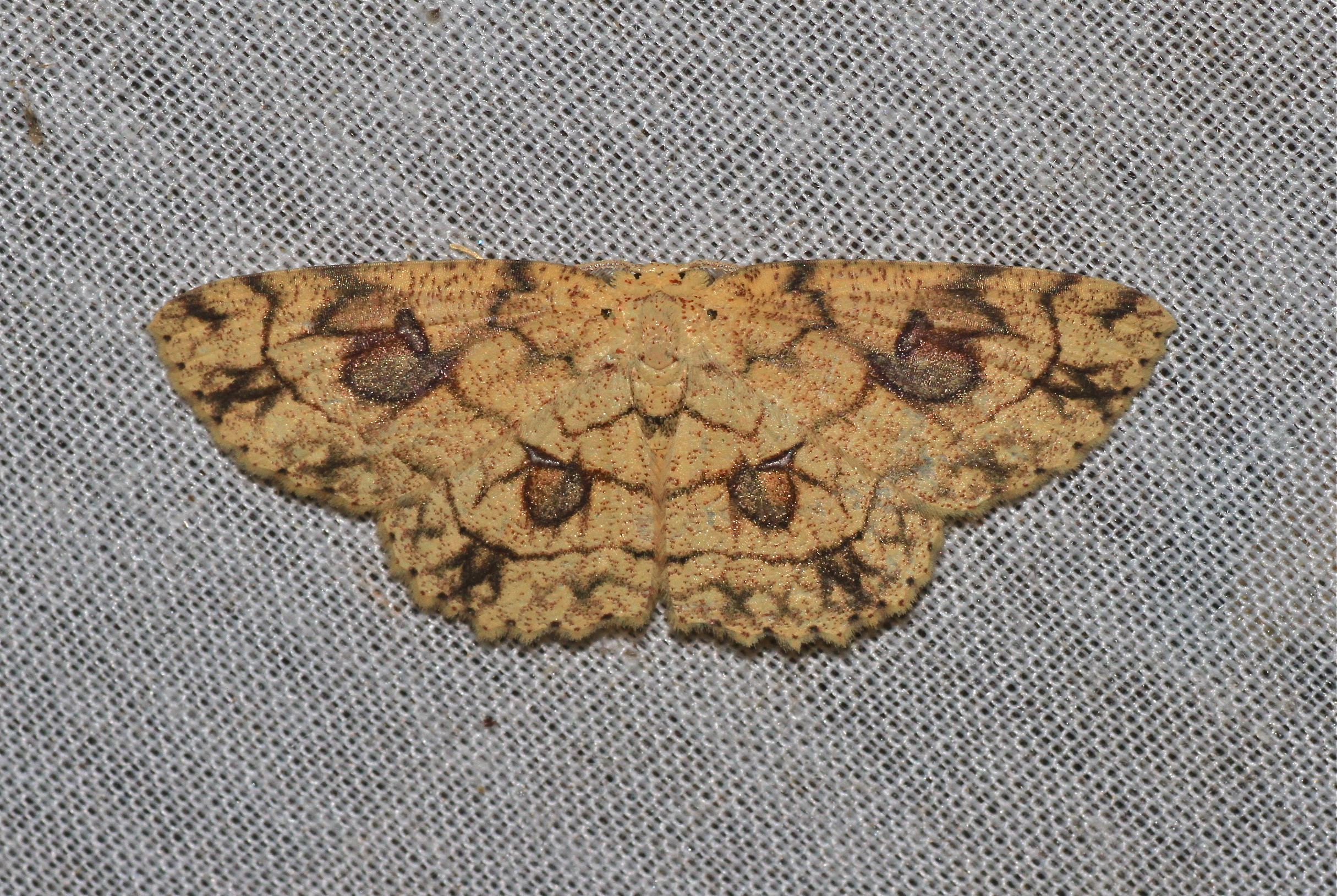
- Borneo, Trusmadi hill dipterocarp forest

Scientific classification
- Domain: Eukaryota
- Kingdom: Animalia
- Phylum: Arthropoda
- Class: Insecta
- Order: Lepidoptera
- Family: Geometridae
- Genus: Cyclophora
- Species: C. heydena

Binomial name
- Cyclophora heydena C. Swinhoe, 1894

Synonyms
- Anisodes heydena C. Swinhoe, 1894; Anisodes heydena victrix Prout, 1938

= Cyclophora heydena =

Species of moth

Cyclophora heydena is a moth in the family Geometridae first described by Charles Swinhoe in 1894. It is found in the north-eastern Himalayas and on Borneo and Java.

== Subspecies ==
- Cyclophora heydena heydena
- Cyclophora heydena victrix (Prout, 1938)
