= Cyclophora atrimacula =

Scientific classification
- Kingdom: Animalia
- Phylum: Arthropoda
- Clade: Pancrustacea
- Class: Insecta
- Order: Lepidoptera
- Family: Geometridae
- Genus: Cyclophora
- Species: C. atrimacula

Binomial name
- Cyclophora atrimacula (Dognin, 1911)

Synonyms
- Anisodes atrimacula Dognin, 1911

Species of moth

Cyclophora atrimacula is a moth in the family Geometridae. It is found in Ecuador.
