= Cyclophora argenticristata =

Scientific classification
- Kingdom: Animalia
- Phylum: Arthropoda
- Clade: Pancrustacea
- Class: Insecta
- Order: Lepidoptera
- Family: Geometridae
- Genus: Cyclophora
- Species: C. argenticristata

Binomial name
- Cyclophora argenticristata (Warren, 1901)

Synonyms
- Anisodes argenticristata Warren, 1901

Species of moth

Cyclophora argenticristata is a moth in the family Geometridae. It is found in Brazil.
