= Cyclophora compacta =

Scientific classification
- Kingdom: Animalia
- Phylum: Arthropoda
- Clade: Pancrustacea
- Class: Insecta
- Order: Lepidoptera
- Family: Geometridae
- Genus: Cyclophora
- Species: C. compacta

Binomial name
- Cyclophora compacta (Warren, 1898)

Synonyms
- Pisoraca compacta Warren, 1898; Anisodes compacta; Anisodes compacta niveostilla Prout, 1934

Species of moth

Cyclophora compacta is a moth in the family Geometridae. It is found on the Kei Islands and in New Guinea and Queensland.

== Subspecies ==
- Cyclophora compacta compacta
- Cyclophora compacta niveostilla (Prout, 1934)
