= Cyclophora glomerata =

Scientific classification
- Kingdom: Animalia
- Phylum: Arthropoda
- Clade: Pancrustacea
- Class: Insecta
- Order: Lepidoptera
- Family: Geometridae
- Genus: Cyclophora
- Species: C. glomerata

Binomial name
- Cyclophora glomerata (Warren, 1903)

Synonyms
- Perixera glomerata Warren, 1903; Anisodes glomerata; Prostenodes comosa Warren, 1903; Anisodes glomerata collusa Prout, 1938

Species of moth

Cyclophora glomerata is a moth in the family Geometridae. It is found in New Guinea and on Seram, Borneo and Sulawesi.

== Subspecies ==
- Cyclophora glomerata glomerata (New Guinea, Seram, Borneo)
- Cyclophora glomerata collusa (Prout, 1938) (Sulawesi)
