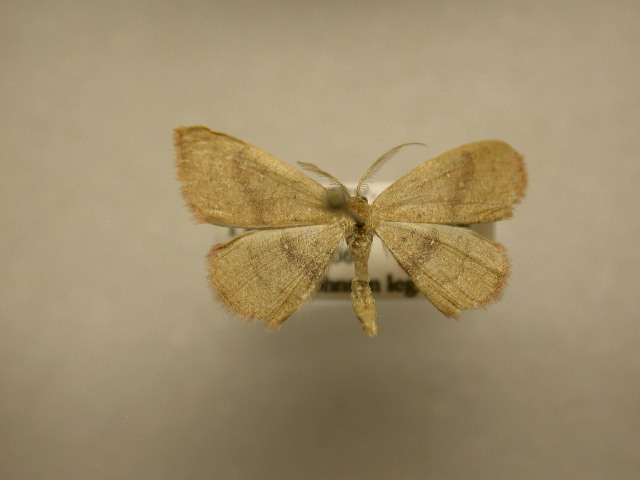

Scientific classification
- Kingdom: Animalia
- Phylum: Arthropoda
- Clade: Pancrustacea
- Class: Insecta
- Order: Lepidoptera
- Family: Geometridae
- Genus: Cyclophora
- Species: C. culicaria

Binomial name
- Cyclophora culicaria (Guenee, 1857)

Synonyms
- Ephyra culicaria Guenee, 1857

= Cyclophora culicaria =

Species of moth

Cyclophora culicaria is a moth in the family Geometridae. It is found in eastern North America, from Florida to Alabama and New Jersey.

The wingspan is about 15 mm. Adults have been recorded on wing from April to June and in August.

The larvae feed on Leiophyllum buxifolium.
