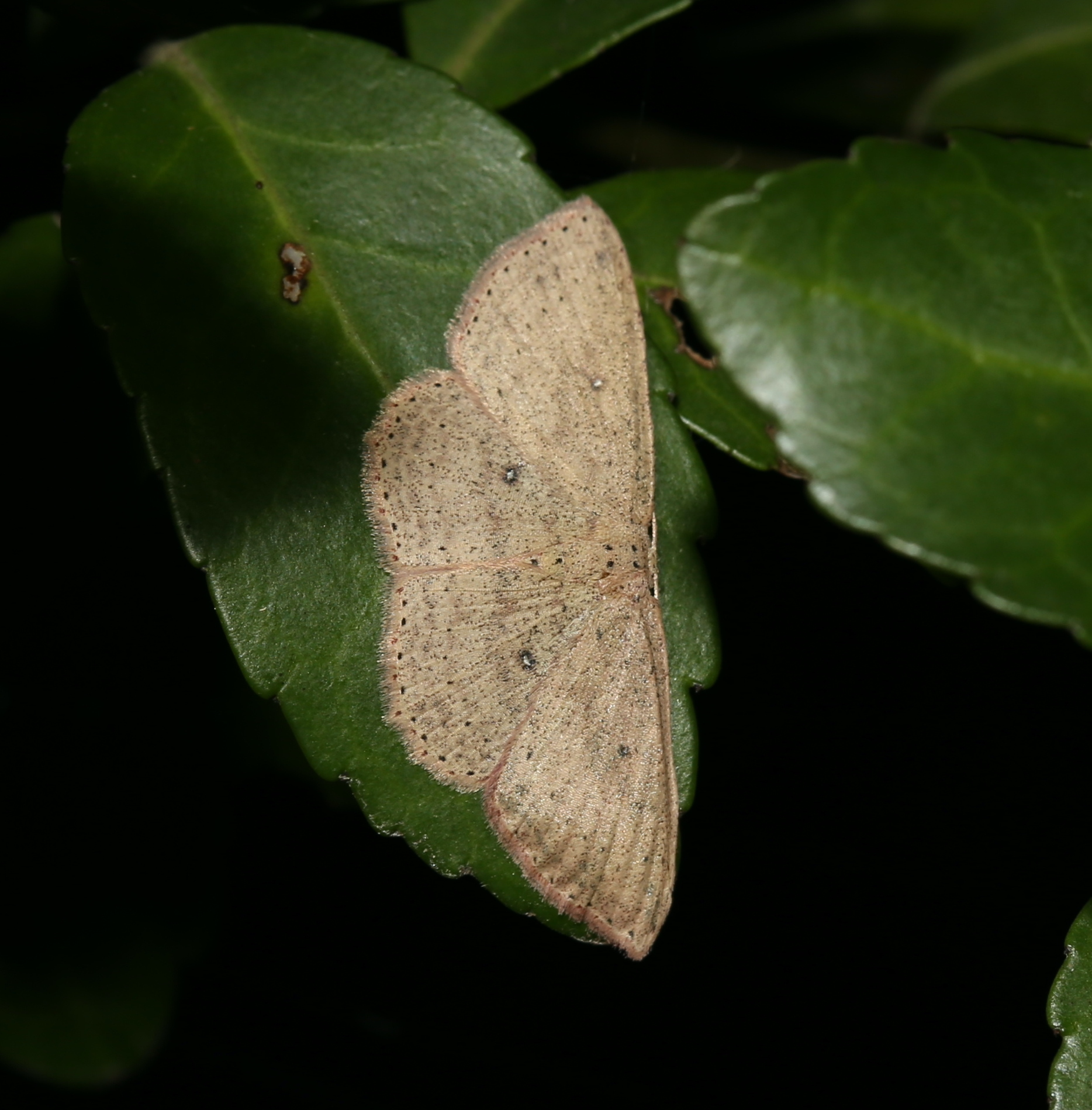

Scientific classification
- Kingdom: Animalia
- Phylum: Arthropoda
- Clade: Pancrustacea
- Class: Insecta
- Order: Lepidoptera
- Family: Geometridae
- Genus: Cyclophora
- Species: C. myrtaria

Binomial name
- Cyclophora myrtaria (Guenee, 1857)

Synonyms
- Ephyra myrtaria Guenee, 1857; Ephyra ignotaria Walker, 1863; Cyclophora triseriata Prout, 1936

= Cyclophora myrtaria =

Species of moth

Cyclophora myrtaria, the waxmyrtle wave moth, is a moth in the family Geometridae. It is found in North America, where it is found along the Atlantic coastal plain.

The wingspan is 24–27 mm.

The larvae feed on Myrtaceae species.
