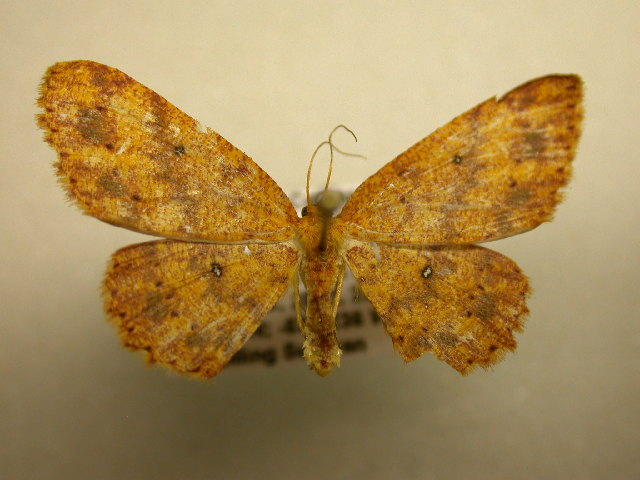
- Cyclophora aurantiata purgata

Scientific classification
- Kingdom: Animalia
- Phylum: Arthropoda
- Clade: Pancrustacea
- Class: Insecta
- Order: Lepidoptera
- Family: Geometridae
- Genus: Cyclophora
- Species: C. aurantiata

Binomial name
- Cyclophora aurantiata (Warren, 1904)

Synonyms
- Anisodes aurantiata Warren, 1904; Anisodes atridiscata Warren, 1906; Anisodes purgata Prout, 1938

= Cyclophora aurantiata =

Species of moth

Cyclophora aurantiata is a moth in the family Geometridae. It is found in Peru and Costa Rica.

== Subspecies ==
- Cyclophora aurantiata aurantiata (Peru)
- Cyclophora aurantiata purgata Prout, 1938 (Costa Rica)
