= Cyclophora brevipalpis =

Scientific classification
- Kingdom: Animalia
- Phylum: Arthropoda
- Class: Insecta
- Order: Lepidoptera
- Family: Geometridae
- Genus: Cyclophora
- Species: C. brevipalpis

Binomial name
- Cyclophora brevipalpis (Dognin, 1913)

Synonyms
- Anisodes brevipalpis Dognin, 1913

Species of moth

Cyclophora brevipalpis is a moth in the family Geometridae. It is found in Colombia.
