= Cyclophora unocula =

Scientific classification
- Kingdom: Animalia
- Phylum: Arthropoda
- Clade: Pancrustacea
- Class: Insecta
- Order: Lepidoptera
- Family: Geometridae
- Genus: Cyclophora
- Species: C. unocula

Binomial name
- Cyclophora unocula (Warren, 1897)

Synonyms
- Cosymbia unocula Warren, 1897

Species of moth

Cyclophora unocula is a moth in the family Geometridae. It is found in South Africa and Tanzania.
