= Cyclophora aurora =

Scientific classification
- Kingdom: Animalia
- Phylum: Arthropoda
- Clade: Pancrustacea
- Class: Insecta
- Order: Lepidoptera
- Family: Geometridae
- Genus: Cyclophora
- Species: C. aurora

Binomial name
- Cyclophora aurora (Warren, 1903)

Synonyms
- Chrysolene aurora Warren, 1903; Anisodes aurora

Species of moth

Cyclophora aurora is a moth in the family Geometridae. It is found in New Guinea.
