= Cyclophora misella =

Scientific classification
- Kingdom: Animalia
- Phylum: Arthropoda
- Clade: Pancrustacea
- Class: Insecta
- Order: Lepidoptera
- Family: Geometridae
- Genus: Cyclophora
- Species: C. misella

Binomial name
- Cyclophora misella (Prout, 1932)

Synonyms
- Anisodes misella Prout, 1932; Pisoraca inornata Warren, 1898

Species of moth

Cyclophora misella is a moth in the family Geometridae. It is found in Nigeria.
