= Cyclophora frenaria =

Scientific classification
- Kingdom: Animalia
- Phylum: Arthropoda
- Clade: Pancrustacea
- Class: Insecta
- Order: Lepidoptera
- Family: Geometridae
- Genus: Cyclophora
- Species: C. frenaria

Binomial name
- Cyclophora frenaria (Guenee, 1857)

Synonyms
- Anisodes frenaria Guenee, 1857; Perixera pulverulenta Swinhoe, 1892; Perixera maculifera Swinhoe, 1900; Perixera plumbeodisca Warren, 1903; Brachycola cyclophora Turner, 1908

Species of moth

Cyclophora frenaria is a moth in the family Geometridae. It is found in the Indo-Australian tropics from India to New Guinea and Queensland.

Larvae have been reared on Uvaria species.
