= Cyclophora megista =

Scientific classification
- Kingdom: Animalia
- Phylum: Arthropoda
- Clade: Pancrustacea
- Class: Insecta
- Order: Lepidoptera
- Family: Geometridae
- Genus: Cyclophora
- Species: C. megista

Binomial name
- Cyclophora megista (H. Druce, 1892)

Synonyms
- Ephyra megista H. Druce, 1892; Anisodes megista; Anisodes catharinae Prout, 1938

Species of moth

Cyclophora megista is a moth in the family Geometridae found in Guatemala.
