= Cyclophora subsimilis =

Scientific classification
- Kingdom: Animalia
- Phylum: Arthropoda
- Clade: Pancrustacea
- Class: Insecta
- Order: Lepidoptera
- Family: Geometridae
- Genus: Cyclophora
- Species: C. subsimilis

Binomial name
- Cyclophora subsimilis (Warren, 1900)

Synonyms
- Euephyra subsimilis Warren, 1900; Anisodes subsimilis

Species of moth

Cyclophora subsimilis is a moth in the family Geometridae. It is found on Sulawesi.
