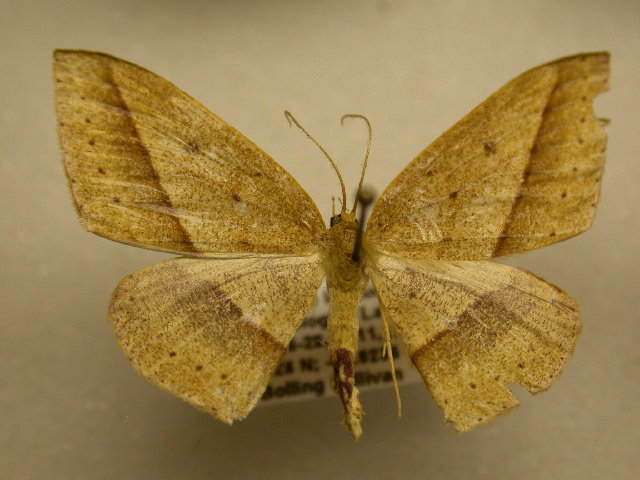

Scientific classification
- Kingdom: Animalia
- Phylum: Arthropoda
- Clade: Pancrustacea
- Class: Insecta
- Order: Lepidoptera
- Family: Geometridae
- Genus: Cyclophora
- Species: C. aquila

Binomial name
- Cyclophora aquila (Schaus, 1912)

Synonyms
- Anisodes aquila Schaus, 1912

= Cyclophora aquila =

Species of moth

Cyclophora aquila is a species of moth in the family Geometridae. It is found in Costa Rica.
