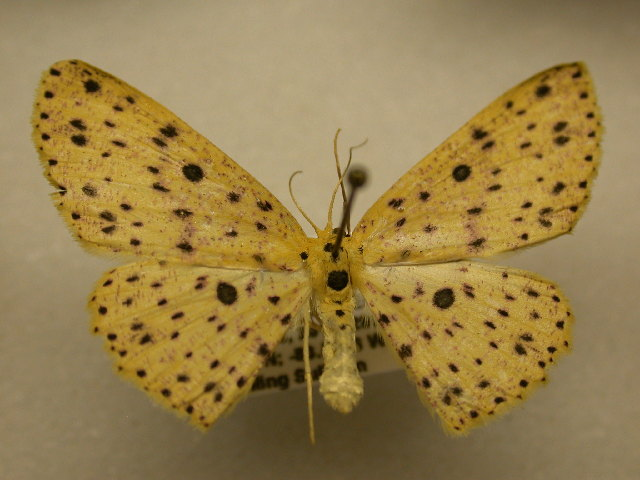
- Cyclophora prunelliaria

Scientific classification
- Kingdom: Animalia
- Phylum: Arthropoda
- Class: Insecta
- Order: Lepidoptera
- Family: Geometridae
- Tribe: Cosymbiini
- Genus: Cyclophora; Hübner, 1822

Synonyms
- Anisodes Guenée, 1858; Codonia Hübner, 1823; Cosymbia Hübner, 1823; Cyclophora Stephens, 1829; Ephyra Duponchel, 1929; Euephyra Packard, 1873; Heterephyra Warren, 1895; Leucophthalmia Hübner, 1823; Matella Gistl, 1848; Pachythalia Warren, 1897; Pisoraca Walker, 1862; Prostenodes Warren, 1903; Streptopteron Swinhoe, 1892; Zonosoma Lederer, 1853

= Cyclophora (moth) =

Genus of moths

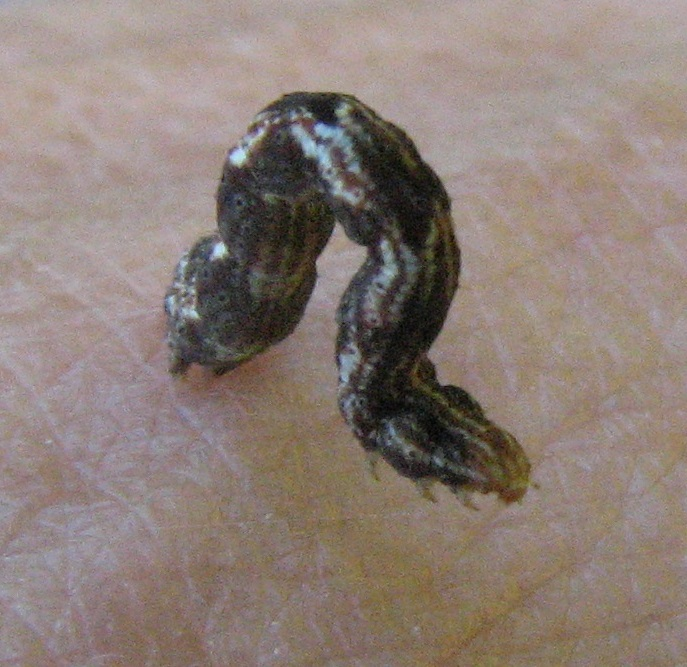
Cyclophora sp. caterpillar

Cyclophora is a genus of moths in the family Geometridae. Many species are referred to as mochas in reference to their colouration, primarily in Europe.

== Taxonomy ==
Traditionally, species included in this genus were either placed in Cyclophora (mostly Holarctic species) and Anisodes (mostly tropical species). Research concluded that these species belong in the same genus. The type species of Anisodes was even found to have features that are used to define Cyclophora.

== Description ==
Palpi hardly reaching beyond the frons. Antennae of male bipectinate (comb like on both sides) to two-thirds length. Forewings with vein 3 from before angle of cell and veins 7, 8 and 9 stalked from before upper angle. Vein 10 and 11 anastomosing (fusing) strongly with them to form the small areole. Hindwings with veins 3, 4 and 6, 7 from angles of cell. The typical section has the medial spur pair of hind tibia absent in male.

== Species ==
- Cyclophora acutaria (Walker, 1863)
- Cyclophora aguzata (Dognin, 1893)
- Cyclophora albidiscata (Warren, 1897)
- Cyclophora albiocellaria (Hübner, 1789)
- Cyclophora albipunctata (Hufnagel, 1767) – birch mocha
- Cyclophora anaisaria (Schaus, 1901)
- Cyclophora angeronaria (Warren, 1895)
- Cyclophora annularia (Fabricius, 1775)
- Cyclophora ariadne (Reisser, 1939)
- Cyclophora arthura (Schaus, 1901)
- Cyclophora auricosta (Prout, 1916)
- Cyclophora aurora (Warren, 1903)
- Cyclophora azorensis (Prout, 1920)
- Cyclophora benjamini (Prout, 1936)
- Cyclophora binocellaria (Herrich-Schäffer, 1855)
- Cyclophora calama (Prout, 1920)
- Cyclophora carsoni Holloway, 1997
- Cyclophora coecaria (Herrich-Schäffer, 1870)
- Cyclophora couturieri Herbulot, 1993
- Cyclophora culicaria (Guenée, 1857)
- Cyclophora dataria (Hulst, 1887)
- Cyclophora decussata (Sepp, 1855)
- Cyclophora difficilis (Prout, 1920)
- Cyclophora diplosticta (Prout, 1918)
- Cyclophora dispergaria (Moschler, 1882)
- Cyclophora dyschroa (Prout, 1918)
- Cyclophora endospila (Prout, 1920)
- Cyclophora eos (Prout, 1916)
- Cyclophora flavissima (Warren, 1907)
- Cyclophora funginaria (Guenée, 1858)
- Cyclophora geranium (Prout, 1917)
- Cyclophora heterostigma (Dognin, 1912)
- Cyclophora hyponoea (Prout, 1935)
- Cyclophora impudens (Warren, 1904)
- Cyclophora inaequalis (Warren, 1902)
- Cyclophora indecisa (Warren, 1907)
- Cyclophora iners (Prout, 1920)
- Cyclophora lennigiaria (Fuchs, 1883)
- Cyclophora leonaria (Walker, 1861)
- Cyclophora linearia (Hübner, 1799) – clay triple-lines
- Cyclophora lowi Holloway, 1997
- Cyclophora lutearia (Dewitz, 1881)
- Cyclophora maderensis (Bethune-Baker, 1891)
- Cyclophora megista (Druce, 1892)
- Cyclophora mesotoma (Prout, 1920)
- Cyclophora mossi (Prout, 1936)
- Cyclophora myrtaria (Guenée, 1857)
- Cyclophora nanaria (Walker, 1861)
- Cyclophora nigrescens Herbulot, 1993
- Cyclophora oothesia (Prout, 1920)
- Cyclophora packardi (Prout, 1936) – Packard's wave
- Cyclophora pendularia (Clerck, 1759) – dingy mocha
- Cyclophora pendulinaria (Guenée, 1857) – sweetfern geometer
- Cyclophora poeciloptera (Prout, 1920)
- Cyclophora porata (Linnaeus, 1767) – false mocha
- Cyclophora prunelliaria (Herrich-Schäffer, 1855)
- Cyclophora punctaria (Linnaeus, 1758) – maiden's blush
- Cyclophora puppillaria (Hübner, 1799)
- Cyclophora quercimontaria (Bastelberger, 1897)
- Cyclophora ruficiliaria (Herrich-Schäffer, 1855) – Jersey mocha
- Cyclophora rufiplaga (Warren, 1903)
- Cyclophora sanguinata (Warren, 1904)
- Cyclophora semirosea (Butler, 1882)
- Cyclophora serveti Redondo & Gastón, 1999
- Cyclophora staudei Hausmann, 2006
- Cyclophora stella (Butler, 1881)
- Cyclophora subdolaria (Swinhoe, 1886)
- Cyclophora sublunata (Swinhoe, 1904)
- Cyclophora subrosea (Warren, 1906)
- Cyclophora subrubrata (Warren, 1905)
- Cyclophora subsimilis (Warren, 1900)
- Cyclophora suppunctaria (Zeller, 1847)
- Cyclophora sympathica (Alphéraky, 1883)
- Cyclophora sypharioides (Prout, 1920)
- Cyclophora tharossa (Druce, 1899)
- Cyclophora umbrata (Butler, 1882)
- Cyclophora unocula (Warren, 1897)
- Cyclophora zeuctospila (Prout, 1920)

== Species formerly included in Anisodes ==
- Cyclophora acampes (Prout, 1938)
- Cyclophora acritophyrta (West, 1930)
- Cyclophora aedes (Prout, 1938)
- Cyclophora aequalipunctata (Dognin, 1901)
- Cyclophora ampligutta (Warren, 1896)
- Cyclophora anablemma (Prout, 1938)
- Cyclophora annularis (Felder & Rogenhofer, 1875)
- Cyclophora antennaria (E. D. Jones, 1921)
- Cyclophora apogona (Prout, 1938)
- Cyclophora aquila (Schaus, 1912)
- Cyclophora argenticristata (Warren, 1901)
- Cyclophora argyromyces (Prout, 1938)
- Cyclophora aspera (Warren, 1901)
- Cyclophora atrimacula (Dognin, 1911)
- Cyclophora aurantiata (Warren, 1904)
- Cyclophora bipartita (Warren, 1900)
- Cyclophora bipunctata (Warren, 1904)
- Cyclophora bizaria (E. D. Jones, 1921)
- Cyclophora brevipalpis (Dognin, 1913)
- Cyclophora caducaria (Moschler, 1886)
- Cyclophora carolina (E. D. Jones, 1921)
- Cyclophora castraria (Schaus, 1901)
- Cyclophora cedrici (Herbulot, 1991)
- Cyclophora circummaculata (Holloway, 1976)
- Cyclophora coenosata (Warren, 1907)
- Cyclophora colysirrhachia (Prout, 1938)
- Cyclophora compacta (Warren, 1898)
- Cyclophora concinnipicta (Prout, 1918)
- Cyclophora conferta (Warren, 1900)
- Cyclophora connexa (Prout, 1932)
- Cyclophora cora (Prout, 1920)
- Cyclophora costinotata (Warren, 1900)
- Cyclophora coxaria (Guenée, 1858)
- Cyclophora dewitzi (Prout, 1920)
- Cyclophora dicycla (Prout, 1936)
- Cyclophora dilogia (Prout, 1938)
- Cyclophora dimerites (Prout, 1932)
- Cyclophora discofera (Swinhoe, 1894)
- Cyclophora dispilota (Prout, 1920)
- Cyclophora dognini (Prout, 1934)
- Cyclophora dulcicola (Dognin, 1911)
- Cyclophora effeminata (Prout, 1914)
- Cyclophora epicoccastria (Prout, 1920)
- Cyclophora evocata (Prout, 1938)
- Cyclophora fantomaria (Schaus, 1901)
- Cyclophora fasciata (Dognin, 1912)
- Cyclophora fastidiosa (Dognin, 1900)
- Cyclophora ferruginata (Warren, 1900)
- Cyclophora flavicornis (Warren, 1906)
- Cyclophora flavidiscata (Warren, 1904)
- Cyclophora flavipuncta (Warren, 1906)
- Cyclophora flavistigma (Warren, 1907)
- Cyclophora frenaria (Guenée, 1857)
- Cyclophora germaini (Prout, 1938)
- Cyclophora gigantula (Warren, 1904)
- Cyclophora globaria (Guenée, 1858)
- Cyclophora glomerata (Warren, 1903)
- Cyclophora gracililinea (Warren, 1907)
- Cyclophora granillosa (Dognin, 1893)
- Cyclophora griseomixta (Warren, 1907)
- Cyclophora heydena (Swinhoe, 1894)
- Cyclophora hieroglyphica (Warren, 1904)
- Cyclophora hirtifemur (Prout, 1932)
- Cyclophora hirtipalpis (Prout, 1932)
- Cyclophora hypocris (Prout, 1928)
- Cyclophora hypomion (Prout, 1933)
- Cyclophora ignea (Warren, 1907)
- Cyclophora illinaria (Guenée, 1858)
- Cyclophora imparistigma (Warren, 1904)
- Cyclophora imperialis (Berio, 1937)
- Cyclophora incumbens (Prout, 1920)
- Cyclophora inhibita (Prout, 1938)
- Cyclophora inquinata (Dognin, 1906)
- Cyclophora insigniata (Warren, 1900)
- Cyclophora intermixtaria (Swinhoe, 1892)
- Cyclophora japaria (E. D. Jones, 1921)
- Cyclophora jonaria (Schaus, 1901)
- Cyclophora khakiata (Warren, 1907)
- Cyclophora lancearia (Felder & Rogenhofer, 1875)
- Cyclophora landanata (Mabille, 1898)
- Cyclophora lateritica (Holloway, 1979)
- Cyclophora lautokensis (Prout, 1929)
- Cyclophora lechriostropha (Turner, 1941)
- Cyclophora leptopasta (Turner, 1908)
- Cyclophora leucaniata (Warren, 1906)
- Cyclophora lichenea (Warren, 1900)
- Cyclophora liosceles (Prout, 1938)
- Cyclophora lutosicosta (Prout, 1938)
- Cyclophora lyciscaria (Guenée, 1858)
- Cyclophora maculidiscata (Warren, 1904)
- Cyclophora major (Dognin, 1911)
- Cyclophora marginepunctata (Dognin, 1902)
- Cyclophora maroniensis (Dognin, 1906)
- Cyclophora matthias (Prout, 1925)
- Cyclophora mediolineata (Warren, 1904)
- Cyclophora melitia (Druce, 1892)
- Cyclophora mesocupha (Prout, 1938)
- Cyclophora metamorpha (Prout, 1925)
- Cyclophora mezclata (Dognin, 1893)
- Cyclophora mionectes (Prout, 1938)
- Cyclophora misella (Prout, 1932)
- Cyclophora monera (Schaus, 1901)
- Cyclophora morbosa (Dognin, 1910)
- Cyclophora nebuligera (Butler, 1881)
- Cyclophora nebulosata (Walker, 1863)
- Cyclophora nigropustulata (Warren, 1900)
- Cyclophora nivestrota (Dognin, 1914)
- Cyclophora nodigera (Butler, 1881)
- Cyclophora nudaria (Guenée, 1858)
- Cyclophora obstataria (Walker, 1861)
- Cyclophora ochricomata (Warren, 1904)
- Cyclophora ockendeni (Prout, 1920)
- Cyclophora ocularis (Warren, 1900)
- Cyclophora orboculata (Prout, 1922)
- Cyclophora ordinata (Walker, 1863)
- Cyclophora palingenes (Prout, 1923)
- Cyclophora paratropa (Prout, 1920)
- Cyclophora parciscripta (Warren, 1907)
- Cyclophora parcisquamata (Prout, 1910)
- Cyclophora parvidens (Warren, 1907)
- Cyclophora patruelis (Moore, 1887)
- Cyclophora pepira (Prout, 1938)
- Cyclophora perpunctulata (Prout, 1938)
- Cyclophora pilibrachia (Prout, 1920)
- Cyclophora pintada (Dognin, 1893)
- Cyclophora plenistigma (Warren, 1901)
- Cyclophora plethophora (Prout, 1938)
- Cyclophora poliotaria (Dyar, 1913)
- Cyclophora polysticta (Prout, 1932)
- Cyclophora pomidiscata (Warren, 1904)
- Cyclophora portenta (Prout, 1936)
- Cyclophora posticamplum (Swinhoe, 1892)
- Cyclophora posticipuncta (Prout, 1938)
- Cyclophora proconcava (Prout, 1932)
- Cyclophora psilomera (Prout, 1936)
- Cyclophora ptochopoea (Prout, 1936)
- Cyclophora punctulosa (Prout, 1936)
- Cyclophora raspata (Dognin, 1900)
- Cyclophora recreta (Prout, 1938)
- Cyclophora renifera (Prout, 1922)
- Cyclophora renistigma (Prout, 1910)
- Cyclophora resignata (Prout, 1938)
- Cyclophora rhodobapta (Turner, 1941)
- Cyclophora rhodostigma (Warren, 1904)
- Cyclophora rotundata (Warren, 1897)
- Cyclophora rubrannulata (Prout, 1910)
- Cyclophora ruficeps (Warren, 1907)
- Cyclophora ruficosta (Warren, 1905)
- Cyclophora rufifrons (Prout, 1938)
- Cyclophora rufistigma (Warren, 1904)
- Cyclophora rufulata (Warren, 1904)
- Cyclophora scintillans (Warren, 1907)
- Cyclophora sciota (Turner, 1908)
- Cyclophora scriptata (Walker, 1861)
- Cyclophora seposita (Prout, 1922)
- Cyclophora silas (Schaus, 1912)
- Cyclophora sopater (Schaus, 1912)
- Cyclophora sordida (Dognin, 1910)
- Cyclophora spadix (Prout, 1922)
- Cyclophora spatara (Dognin, 1900)
- Cyclophora spectabilis (Prout, 1938)
- Cyclophora spiculifer (Warren, 1907)
- Cyclophora spissata (Warren, 1900)
- Cyclophora sticta (Turner, 1941)
- Cyclophora stigmatilinea (Prout, 1920)
- Cyclophora stramineata (Warren, 1900)
- Cyclophora stricticata (Warren, 1906)
- Cyclophora striginota (Prout, 1938)
- Cyclophora subaenescens (Warren, 1904)
- Cyclophora subcarnearia (Warren, 1900)
- Cyclophora suberea (Dognin, 1900)
- Cyclophora subpallida (Warren, 1900)
- Cyclophora subviolescens (Warren, 1906)
- Cyclophora superflua (Warren, 1897)
- Cyclophora suspiciens (Prout, 1922)
- Cyclophora sypharia (Guenée, 1858)
- Cyclophora taiwana (Wileman, 1911)
- Cyclophora temperata (Prout, 1936)
- Cyclophora terrens (Warren, 1906)
- Cyclophora timotheus (Schaus, 1912)
- Cyclophora tolinta (Schaus, 1901)
- Cyclophora torsivena (Warren, 1904)
- Cyclophora transecta (Schaus, 1912)
- Cyclophora tricrista (Prout, 1925)
- Cyclophora turneri (Prout, 1920)
- Cyclophora tychicus (Schaus, 1912)
- Cyclophora urcearia (Guenée, 1857)
- Cyclophora viator (Prout, 1920)
- Cyclophora vineotincta (Schaus, 1912)
- Cyclophora violens (Prout, 1936)
- Cyclophora vuha (Schaus, 1929)
- Cyclophora warreni (Dognin, 1913)
- Cyclophora xenocometes (Prout, 1938)
