= Cyclophora decussata =

Scientific classification
- Kingdom: Animalia
- Phylum: Arthropoda
- Clade: Pancrustacea
- Class: Insecta
- Order: Lepidoptera
- Family: Geometridae
- Genus: Cyclophora
- Species: C. decussata

Binomial name
- Cyclophora decussata (Sepp, 1855)

Synonyms
- Phalaena decussata Sepp, 1855; Anisodes decussata; Anisodes curvisignata Prout, 1938; Anisodes delineata Warren, 1906

Species of moth

Cyclophora decussata is a moth in the family Geometridae. It is found in Suriname, French Guiana and Brazil.

== Subspecies ==
- Cyclophora decussata decussata
- Cyclophora decussata curvisignata (Prout, 1938) (Brazil)
