= Cyclophora scriptata =

Scientific classification
- Kingdom: Animalia
- Phylum: Arthropoda
- Clade: Pancrustacea
- Class: Insecta
- Order: Lepidoptera
- Family: Geometridae
- Genus: Cyclophora
- Species: C. scriptata

Binomial name
- Cyclophora scriptata (Walker, 1861)

Synonyms
- Anisodes scriptata Walker, 1861

Species of moth

Cyclophora scriptata is a moth in the family Geometridae. It is found on Borneo. The habitat consists of lowland areas.
