= Cyclophora oothesia =

Scientific classification
- Kingdom: Animalia
- Phylum: Arthropoda
- Clade: Pancrustacea
- Class: Insecta
- Order: Lepidoptera
- Family: Geometridae
- Genus: Cyclophora
- Species: C. oothesia

Binomial name
- Cyclophora oothesia (Prout, 1920)

Synonyms
- Pisoraca oothesia Prout, 1920; Anisodes oothesia

Species of moth

Cyclophora oothesia is a moth in the family Geometridae. It is found in eastern Peru.
