= Cyclophora geranium =

Scientific classification
- Kingdom: Animalia
- Phylum: Arthropoda
- Clade: Pancrustacea
- Class: Insecta
- Order: Lepidoptera
- Family: Geometridae
- Genus: Cyclophora
- Species: C. geranium

Binomial name
- Cyclophora geranium (Prout, 1917)

Synonyms
- Ptochophyle geranium Prout, 1917; Anisodes geranium

Species of moth

Cyclophora geranium is a moth in the family Geometridae. It is found in New Guinea.
