= Cyclophora binocellaria =

Scientific classification
- Kingdom: Animalia
- Phylum: Arthropoda
- Class: Insecta
- Order: Lepidoptera
- Family: Geometridae
- Genus: Cyclophora
- Species: C. binocellaria

Binomial name
- Cyclophora binocellaria (Herrich-Schaffer, 1855)

Synonyms
- Zonosoma binocellaria Herrich-Schaffer, 1855; Anisodes binocellaria; Anisodes magnidiscata Warren, 1904

Species of moth

Cyclophora binocellaria is a moth in the family Geometridae. It is found in Venezuela and Bolivia.
