= Cyclophora acritophyrta =

Scientific classification
- Kingdom: Animalia
- Phylum: Arthropoda
- Clade: Pancrustacea
- Class: Insecta
- Order: Lepidoptera
- Family: Geometridae
- Genus: Cyclophora
- Species: C. acritophyrta

Binomial name
- Cyclophora acritophyrta (West, 1930)

Synonyms
- Anisodes acritophyrta West, 1930

Species of moth

Cyclophora acritophyrta is a moth in the family Geometridae. It is found on Luzon.
