= Cyclophora dimerites =

Scientific classification
- Kingdom: Animalia
- Phylum: Arthropoda
- Clade: Pancrustacea
- Class: Insecta
- Order: Lepidoptera
- Family: Geometridae
- Genus: Cyclophora
- Species: C. dimerites

Binomial name
- Cyclophora dimerites (Prout, 1932)

Synonyms
- Anisodes dimerites Prout, 1932; Anisodes dimerites goliathi Prout, 1938

Species of moth

Cyclophora dimerites is a moth in the family Geometridae. It is found in New Guinea and on Borneo.

== Subspecies ==
- Cyclophora dimerites dimerites (Borneo)
- Cyclophora dimerites goliathi (Prout, 1938) (New Guinea)
