= Cyclophora indecisa =

Scientific classification
- Kingdom: Animalia
- Phylum: Arthropoda
- Clade: Pancrustacea
- Class: Insecta
- Order: Lepidoptera
- Family: Geometridae
- Genus: Cyclophora
- Species: C. indecisa

Binomial name
- Cyclophora indecisa (Warren, 1907)

Synonyms
- Perixera indecisa Warren, 1907; Anisodes indecisa; Anisodes pepira f. sbesta Prout, 1938

Species of moth

Cyclophora indecisa is a moth in the family Geometridae. It is found in New Guinea and on Seram, Peninsular Malaysia, Borneo and Luzon in the Philippines. The habitat consists of lower montane forests.
