= Cyclophora bipartita =

Scientific classification
- Kingdom: Animalia
- Phylum: Arthropoda
- Class: Insecta
- Order: Lepidoptera
- Family: Geometridae
- Genus: Cyclophora
- Species: C. bipartita

Binomial name
- Cyclophora bipartita (Warren, 1900)

Synonyms
- Anisodes bipartita Warren, 1900; Anisodes montana Prout, 1936

Species of moth

Cyclophora bipartita is a moth in the family Geometridae. It is found in Colombia and Peru.

== Subspecies ==
- Cyclophora bipartita bipartita (Colombia)
- Cyclophora bipartita montana (Prout, 1936) (Peru)
