= Cyclophora heterostigma =

Scientific classification
- Kingdom: Animalia
- Phylum: Arthropoda
- Clade: Pancrustacea
- Class: Insecta
- Order: Lepidoptera
- Family: Geometridae
- Genus: Cyclophora
- Species: C. heterostigma

Binomial name
- Cyclophora heterostigma (Dognin, 1912)

Synonyms
- Anisodes heterostigma Dognin, 1912

Species of moth

Cyclophora heterostigma is a moth in the family Geometridae. It is found in Colombia.
