= Cyclophora hirtifemur =

Scientific classification
- Kingdom: Animalia
- Phylum: Arthropoda
- Clade: Pancrustacea
- Class: Insecta
- Order: Lepidoptera
- Family: Geometridae
- Genus: Cyclophora
- Species: C. hirtifemur

Binomial name
- Cyclophora hirtifemur (Prout, 1932)

Synonyms
- Anisodes hirtifemur Prout, 1932

Species of moth

Cyclophora hirtifemur is a moth in the family Geometridae. It is found in Nigeria.
