= Cyclophora couturieri =

Scientific classification
- Kingdom: Animalia
- Phylum: Arthropoda
- Clade: Pancrustacea
- Class: Insecta
- Order: Lepidoptera
- Family: Geometridae
- Genus: Cyclophora
- Species: C. couturieri

Binomial name
- Cyclophora couturieri Herbulot, 1993

Species of moth

Cyclophora couturieri is a moth in the family Geometridae. It is found in Peru.

The larvae feed on Myrciaria dubia.
