= Cyclophora stella =

Scientific classification
- Kingdom: Animalia
- Phylum: Arthropoda
- Clade: Pancrustacea
- Class: Insecta
- Order: Lepidoptera
- Family: Geometridae
- Genus: Cyclophora
- Species: C. stella

Binomial name
- Cyclophora stella (Butler, 1881)

Synonyms
- Acidalia stella Butler, 1881; Acidalia nubicolor Thierry-Mieg, 1892; Craspedia gosina Schaus, 1901

Species of moth

Cyclophora stella is a moth in the family Geometridae. It is found in Brazil.
