= Cyclophora aedes =

Scientific classification
- Kingdom: Animalia
- Phylum: Arthropoda
- Clade: Pancrustacea
- Class: Insecta
- Order: Lepidoptera
- Family: Geometridae
- Genus: Cyclophora
- Species: C. aedes

Binomial name
- Cyclophora aedes (Prout, 1938)

Synonyms
- Anisodes aedes Prout, 1938

Species of moth

Cyclophora aedes is a moth in the family Geometridae. Described by Louis Beethoven Prout in 1938, it is found on Peninsular Malaysia.
