= Cyclophora subrubrata =

Scientific classification
- Kingdom: Animalia
- Phylum: Arthropoda
- Clade: Pancrustacea
- Class: Insecta
- Order: Lepidoptera
- Family: Geometridae
- Genus: Cyclophora
- Species: C. subrubrata

Binomial name
- Cyclophora subrubrata (Warren, 1905)

Synonyms
- Mesotrophe subrubrata Warren, 1905; Anisodes subrubrata; Perixera ustipennis Warren, 1905

Species of moth

Cyclophora subrubrata is a moth in the family Geometridae. It is found on the Solomon Islands.
