= Cyclophora suppunctaria =

Scientific classification
- Kingdom: Animalia
- Phylum: Arthropoda
- Clade: Pancrustacea
- Class: Insecta
- Order: Lepidoptera
- Family: Geometridae
- Genus: Cyclophora
- Species: C. suppunctaria

Binomial name
- Cyclophora suppunctaria (Zeller, 1847)

Synonyms
- Cabera suppunctaria Zeller, 1847; Cyclophora amabilis Schawerda, 1922; Cyclophora grisea Schawerda, 1938

Species of moth

Cyclophora suppunctaria is a moth in the family Geometridae. It was described by Philipp Christoph Zeller in 1847. It is found in Spain, Andorra, France, Austria, Switzerland, Italy, Slovakia, Albania, Slovenia, Croatia, Bulgaria, Romania, Hungary, North Macedonia, Greece, on Sardinia, Corsica, Sicily and Crete, as well as in Tunisia, Turkey, Russia and Ukraine.

The wingspan is 23–30 millimetres (0.91–1.18 in).

The larvae feed on Quercus species, including Quercus pubescens, Quercus pyrenaica and Quercus robur.
