= Cyclophora costinotata =

Scientific classification
- Kingdom: Animalia
- Phylum: Arthropoda
- Clade: Pancrustacea
- Class: Insecta
- Order: Lepidoptera
- Family: Geometridae
- Genus: Cyclophora
- Species: C. costinotata

Binomial name
- Cyclophora costinotata (Warren, 1900)

Synonyms
- Anisodes costinotata Warren, 1900

Species of moth

Cyclophora costinotata is a moth in the family Geometridae. It is found in Colombia.
