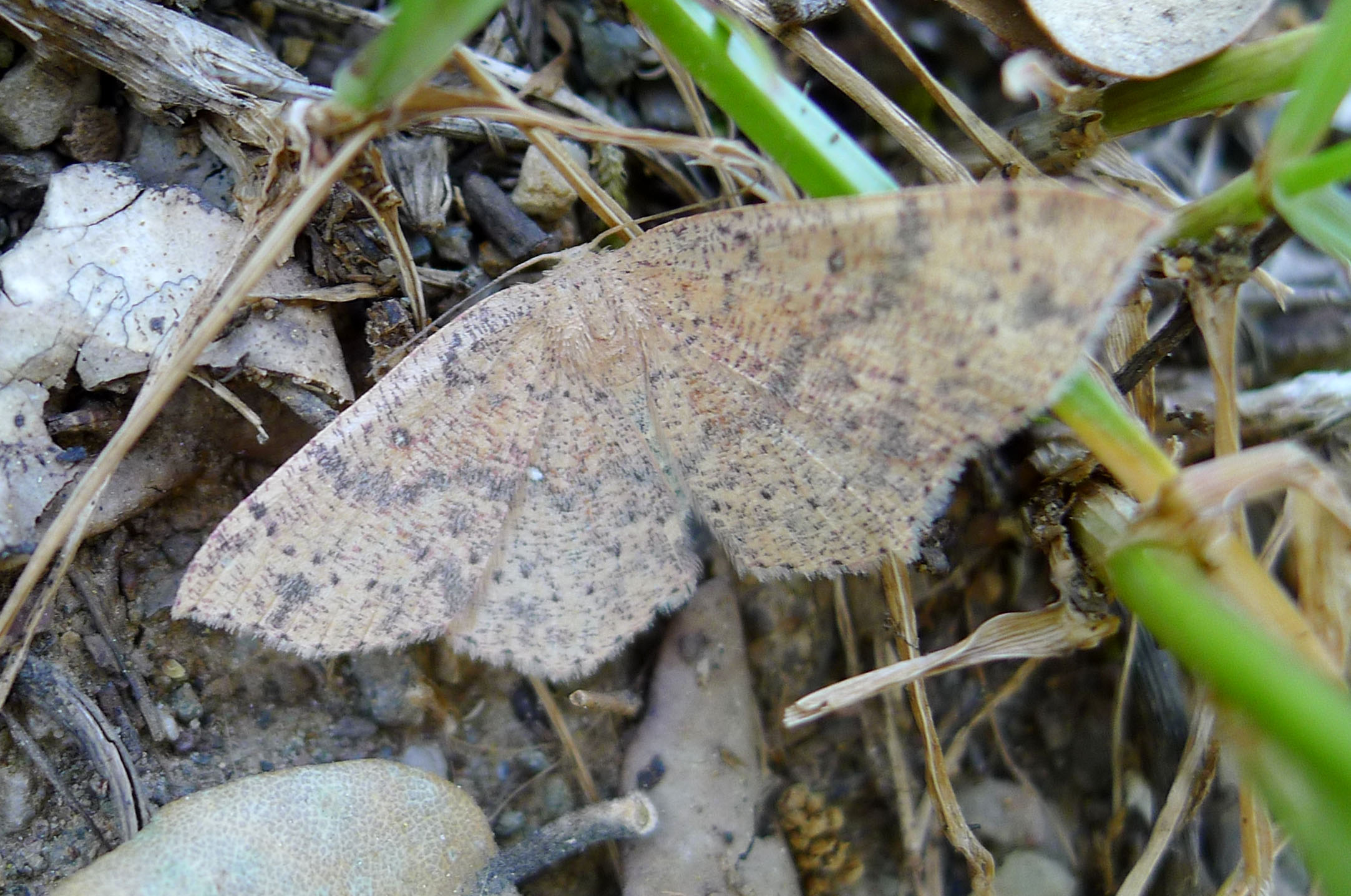

Scientific classification
- Kingdom: Animalia
- Phylum: Arthropoda
- Class: Insecta
- Order: Lepidoptera
- Family: Geometridae
- Genus: Cyclophora
- Species: C. hyponoea

Binomial name
- Cyclophora hyponoea (Prout, 1935)

Synonyms
- Cosymbia hyponoea Prout, 1935

= Cyclophora hyponoea =

Species of moth

Cyclophora hyponoea is a moth in the family Geometridae. It was described by Louis Beethoven Prout in 1935. It is found in Portugal, Spain, north-eastern Algeria and northern Tunisia.
