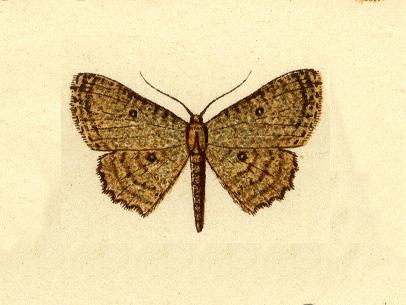

Scientific classification
- Kingdom: Animalia
- Phylum: Arthropoda
- Clade: Pancrustacea
- Class: Insecta
- Order: Lepidoptera
- Family: Geometridae
- Genus: Cyclophora
- Species: C. lichenea

Binomial name
- Cyclophora lichenea (Warren, 1900)

Synonyms
- Anisodes lichenea Warren, 1900

= Cyclophora lichenea =

Species of moth

Cyclophora lichenea is a moth of the family Geometridae. It is found on Jamaica.
