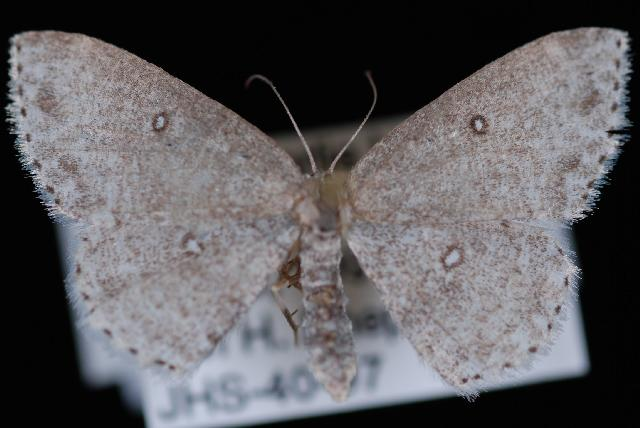

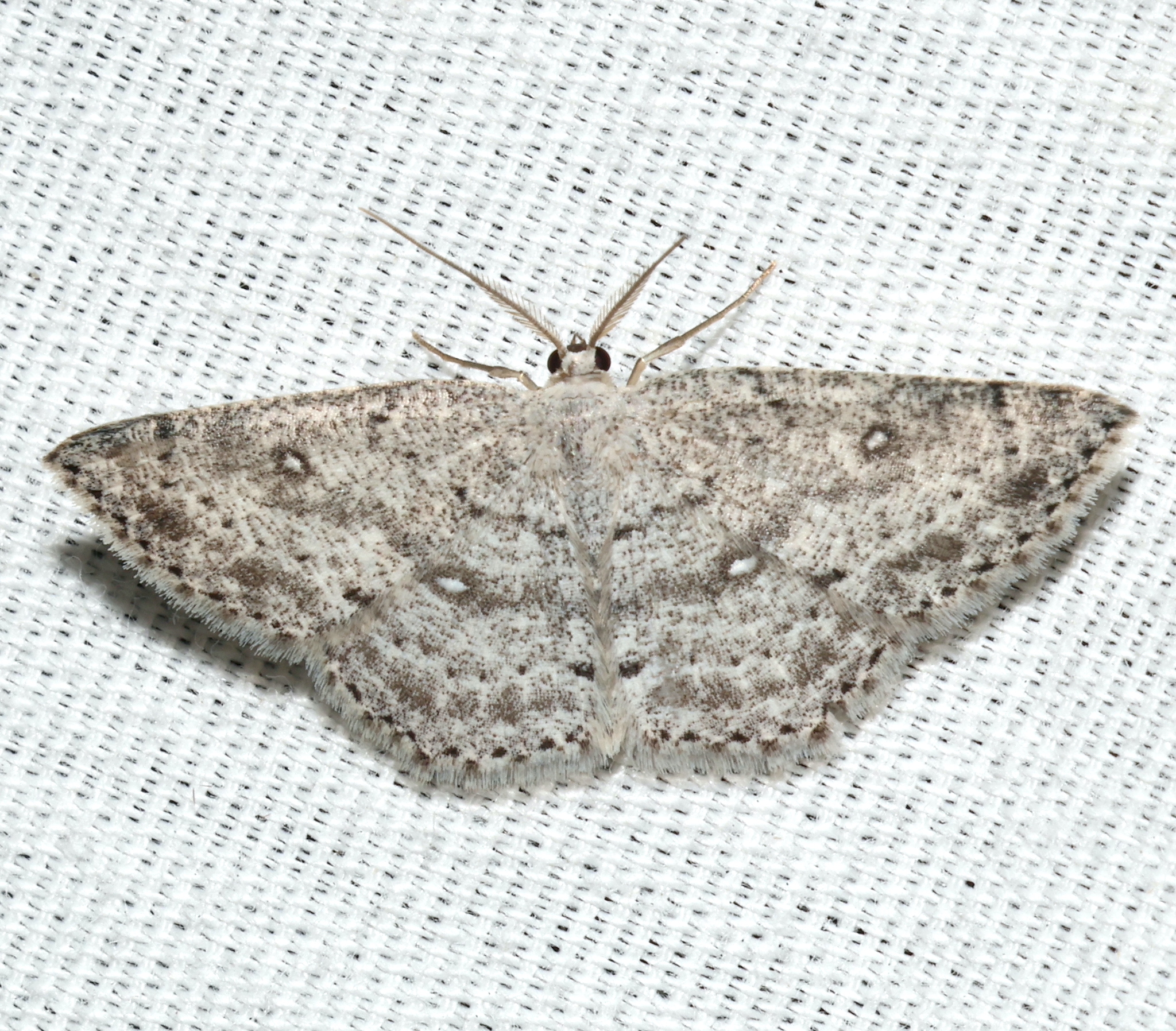

Scientific classification
- Kingdom: Animalia
- Phylum: Arthropoda
- Class: Insecta
- Order: Lepidoptera
- Family: Geometridae
- Genus: Cyclophora
- Species: C. pendulinaria

Binomial name
- Cyclophora pendulinaria (Guenee, 1857)

Synonyms
- Ephyra pendulinaria Guenee, 1857; Cyclophora dilucidaria Rothke, 1920; Cosymbia griseor McDunnough, 1927; Cosymbia lumenaria Hubner, 1832; Cyclophora nigricaria Rothke, 1920; Acidalia quadriannulata Walker, 1863

= Cyclophora pendulinaria =

Species of moth

Cyclophora pendulinaria, the sweetfern geometer moth or pearly-grey wave, is a moth in the family Geometridae.

== Overview ==
It is found in North America, where it is found from Newfoundland and Labrador west to the Yukon and coastal British Columbia, south to Georgia in the east. The habitat consists of moist or mesic forests.

The wingspan is 17–26 mm. Adults have been recorded on wing from April to October.

The larvae feed on the leaves of Comptonia and Alnus species.
