= Cyclophora subdolaria =

Scientific classification
- Kingdom: Animalia
- Phylum: Arthropoda
- Clade: Pancrustacea
- Class: Insecta
- Order: Lepidoptera
- Family: Geometridae
- Genus: Cyclophora
- Species: C. subdolaria

Binomial name
- Cyclophora subdolaria (C. Swinhoe, 1886)

Synonyms
- Ephyra subdolaria C. Swinhoe, 1886; Anisodes subdolaria; Pisoraca simplex Warren, 1903

Species of moth

Cyclophora subdolaria is a moth in the family Geometridae first described by Charles Swinhoe in 1886. It is found in India and New Guinea.
