= Cyclophora cedrici =

Scientific classification
- Kingdom: Animalia
- Phylum: Arthropoda
- Clade: Pancrustacea
- Class: Insecta
- Order: Lepidoptera
- Family: Geometridae
- Genus: Cyclophora
- Species: C. cedrici

Binomial name
- Cyclophora cedrici (Herbulot, 1991)

Synonyms
- Anisodes cedrici Herbulot, 1991

Species of moth

Cyclophora cedrici is a moth in the family Geometridae. It is found on Príncipe.
