= Cyclophora maderensis =

Scientific classification
- Kingdom: Animalia
- Phylum: Arthropoda
- Clade: Pancrustacea
- Class: Insecta
- Order: Lepidoptera
- Family: Geometridae
- Genus: Cyclophora
- Species: C. maderensis

Binomial name
- Cyclophora maderensis (Bethune-Baker, 1891)

Synonyms
- Zonosoma maderensis Bethune-Baker, 1891; Acidalia wollastoni Bethune-Baker, 1891; Cosymbia lundbladi Bryk, 1940

Species of moth

Cyclophora maderensis is a moth in the family Geometridae. It is found on the Canary Islands and Madeira.

The wingspan is 18–25 mm. The forewings are ochreous, finely and densely irrorated with rough pinkish scales. There is a central waved band with a grey hue and a paler ochre subterminal line. The hindwings are also ochreous.

The larvae feed on Erica species, including Erica arborea.

== Subspecies ==
- Cyclophora maderensis maderensis (Madeira)
- Cyclophora maderensis trilineata (Prout, 1934) (Canary Islands)
