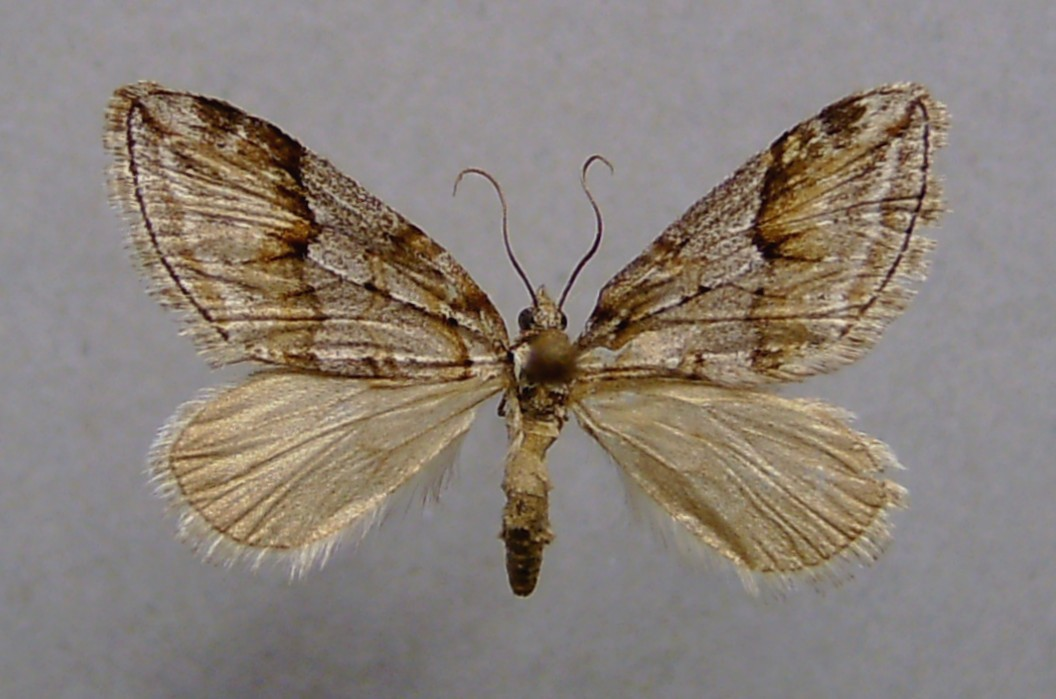

Scientific classification
- Kingdom: Animalia
- Phylum: Arthropoda
- Clade: Pancrustacea
- Class: Insecta
- Order: Lepidoptera
- Family: Geometridae
- Genus: Chesias
- Species: C. rufata

Binomial name
- Chesias rufata (Fabricius, 1775)

Synonyms
- Phalaena rufata Fabricius, 1775; Chesias pinkeri Schawerda, 1939; Chesias zuellichi Schawerda, 1939

= Chesias rufata =

Broom-tip

Species of moth

Chesias rufata, the broom-tip, is a moth of the family Geometridae. It was described by Johan Christian Fabricius in 1775. It has a wide range in central and western Europe, including Great Britain and Ireland. It is also found from Morocco to Asia Minor.The species prefers heaths, bushy slopes and rocky valleys which favour its foodplants. It is found up to 1,500m in the Alps.

The wingspan is 26–32 millimetres (1.0–1.3 in). The approximately oval-shaped wings are typical. The basal area of the forewing is silver. There is a very distinct reddish-brown cross band. Some specimens show a grey basal area and very wide reddish-brown areas on either side of the midfield. Others show a black mark on the upper part of the second cross line of the forewings following the mark is a reddish or ochreous flush, extending to the tips of the wings. A dark dividing line is located at the apex. A wavy whitish stands near the margin. The hindwings are unpatterned ochre grey in colour. Prout describes the most frequent varieties. The egg is rather small, oval, slightly broadened and deepened at the micropylar end; the surface faintly pitted. The colour is delicate orange, approaching salmon-colour. The larva is closely similar to that of legatella but the subdorsal line is edged with darker green and the spiracles are black.

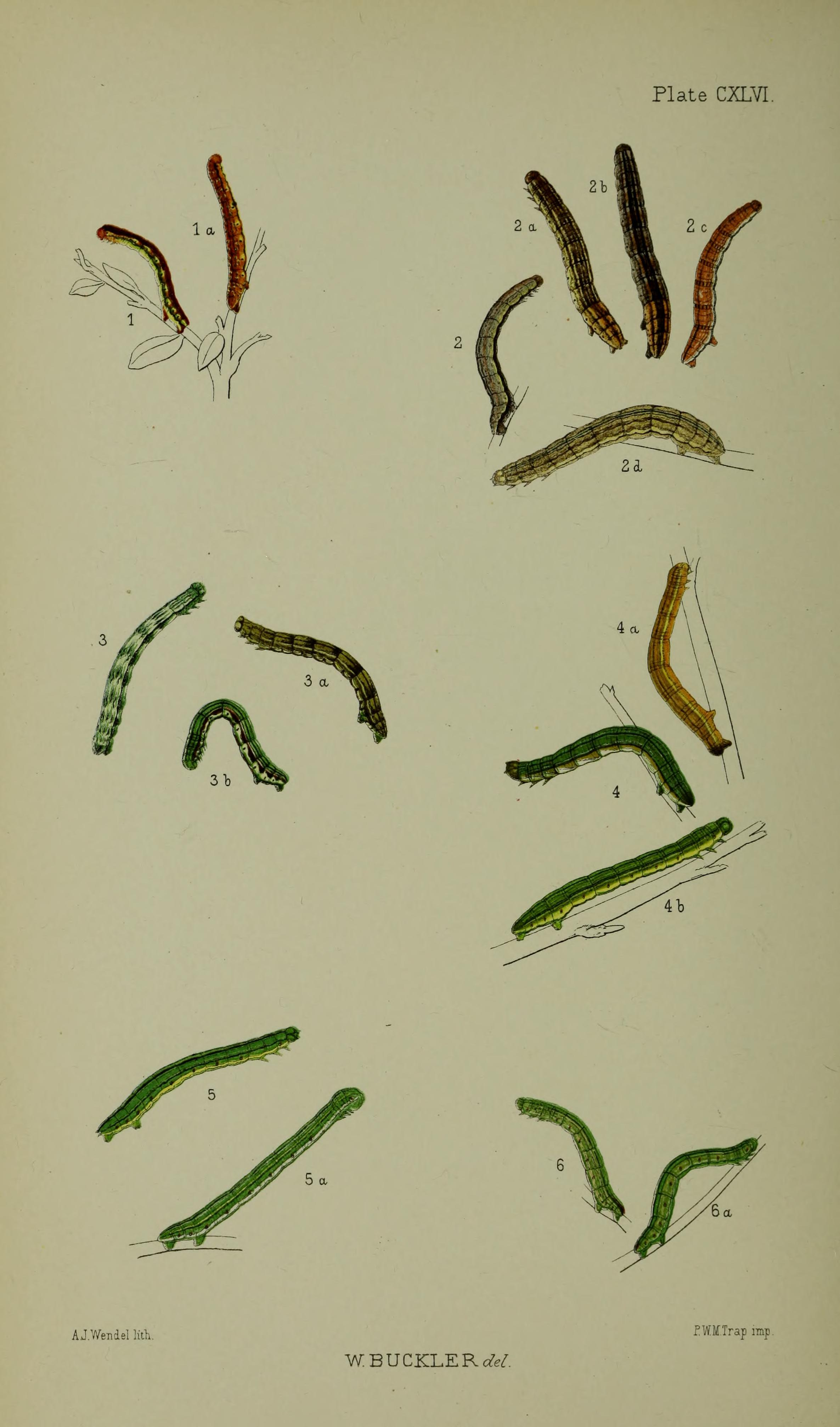
Figs.5, 5a larvae after final moult

The larvae feed on Cytisus scoparius, Genista tinctoria and Genista germanica. The larvae feed at night and are then rather conspicuous, as they have a habit of stretching out from the plant at full length. They may be found from June to September. Adults are on wing from April to May. Normally, there is one generation per year. However, a second generation may occur with adults on wing from June to August and the moth is very erratic in its time of emerging which — at least in some seasons and in some localities. Adults have been recorded feeding on nectar from the flowers of Salix and Berberis species.

== Subspecies ==
- Chesias rufata rufata
- Chesias rufata cinereata Staudinger, 1901
- Chesias rufata obliquaria Denis & Schiffermüller, 1775
- Chesias rufata occidentalis Delahaye, 1900
- Chesias rufata ornata Heydemann, 1933
- Chesias rufata plumbeata Staudinger, 1901 (Morocco)
- Chesias rufata pinkeri Schawerda, 1939
- Chesias rufata scotica Richardson, 1952

== Etymology ==
The scientific name of the species derives from the Latin rufus meaning "red".
