= Catocala giuditta =

Scientific classification
- Kingdom: Animalia
- Phylum: Arthropoda
- Class: Insecta
- Order: Lepidoptera
- Superfamily: Noctuoidea
- Family: Erebidae
- Genus: Catocala
- Species: C. giuditta

Binomial name
- Catocala giuditta Schawerda, 1934

Species of moth

Catocala giuditta is a moth in the family Erebidae first described by Schawerda in 1934. It is found in Algeria.
