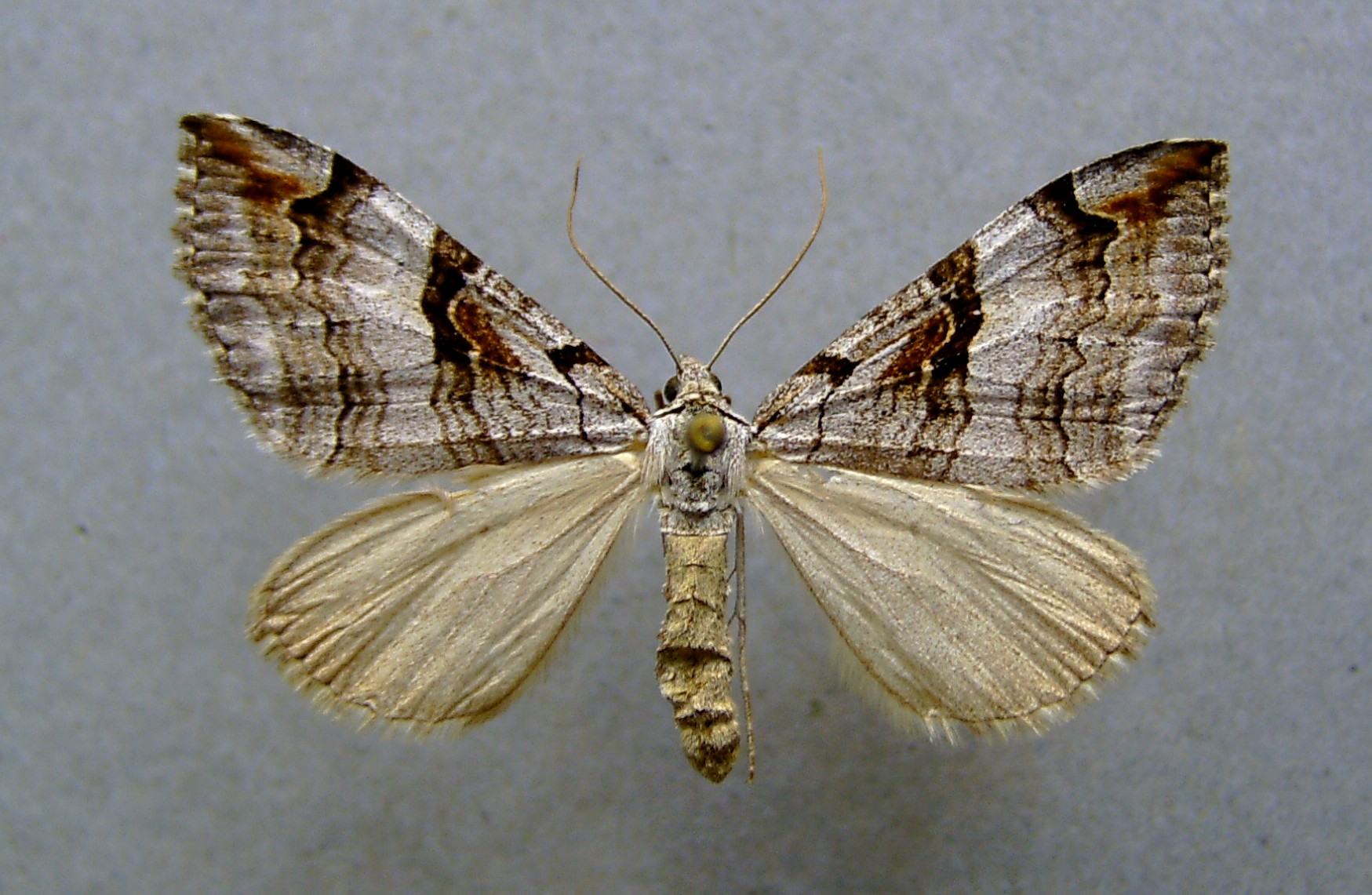
- Aplocera praeformata

Scientific classification
- Kingdom: Animalia
- Phylum: Arthropoda
- Clade: Pancrustacea
- Class: Insecta
- Order: Lepidoptera
- Family: Geometridae
- Subfamily: Larentiinae
- Tribe: Chesiadini; Stephens, 1850

= Chesiadini =

Tribe of moths

Chesiadini is a tribe of geometer moths under subfamily Larentiinae. The tribe was described by Stephens in 1850.

== Recognized genera ==
- Amygdaloptera Gumppenberg, 1887
- Aplocera Stephens, 1827
- Carsia Hübner, 1825
- Chesias Treitschke, 1825
- Chesistege Viidalepp, 1990
- Coenotephria Prout, 1914
- Docirava Walker, [1863]
- Epiphryne Meyrick, 1883
- Lithostege Hübner, 1825
- Odezia Boisduval, 1840
- Schistostege Hübner, 1825
