= Chesias angeri =

Scientific classification
- Kingdom: Animalia
- Phylum: Arthropoda
- Clade: Pancrustacea
- Class: Insecta
- Order: Lepidoptera
- Family: Geometridae
- Genus: Chesias
- Species: C. angeri

Binomial name
- Chesias angeri Schawerda, 1919

Species of moth

Chesias angeri is a moth of the family Geometridae. It is endemic to Italy.
