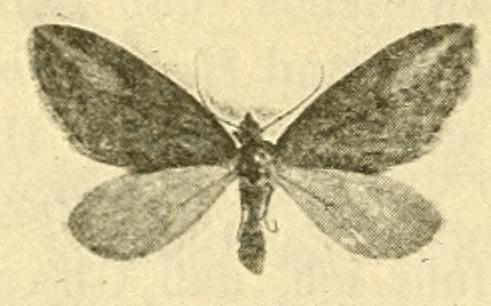

Scientific classification
- Domain: Eukaryota
- Kingdom: Animalia
- Phylum: Arthropoda
- Class: Insecta
- Order: Lepidoptera
- Family: Geometridae
- Genus: Chesias
- Species: C. isabella

Binomial name
- Chesias isabella Schawerda, 1915

= Chesias isabella =

Species of moth

Chesias isabella is a moth of the family Geometridae. It was described by Schawerda in 1915. It is found in France, Spain and Portugal.

The wingspan is 36–39 millimetres (1.4–1.5 in). There is one generation per year with adults on wing from May to July.
