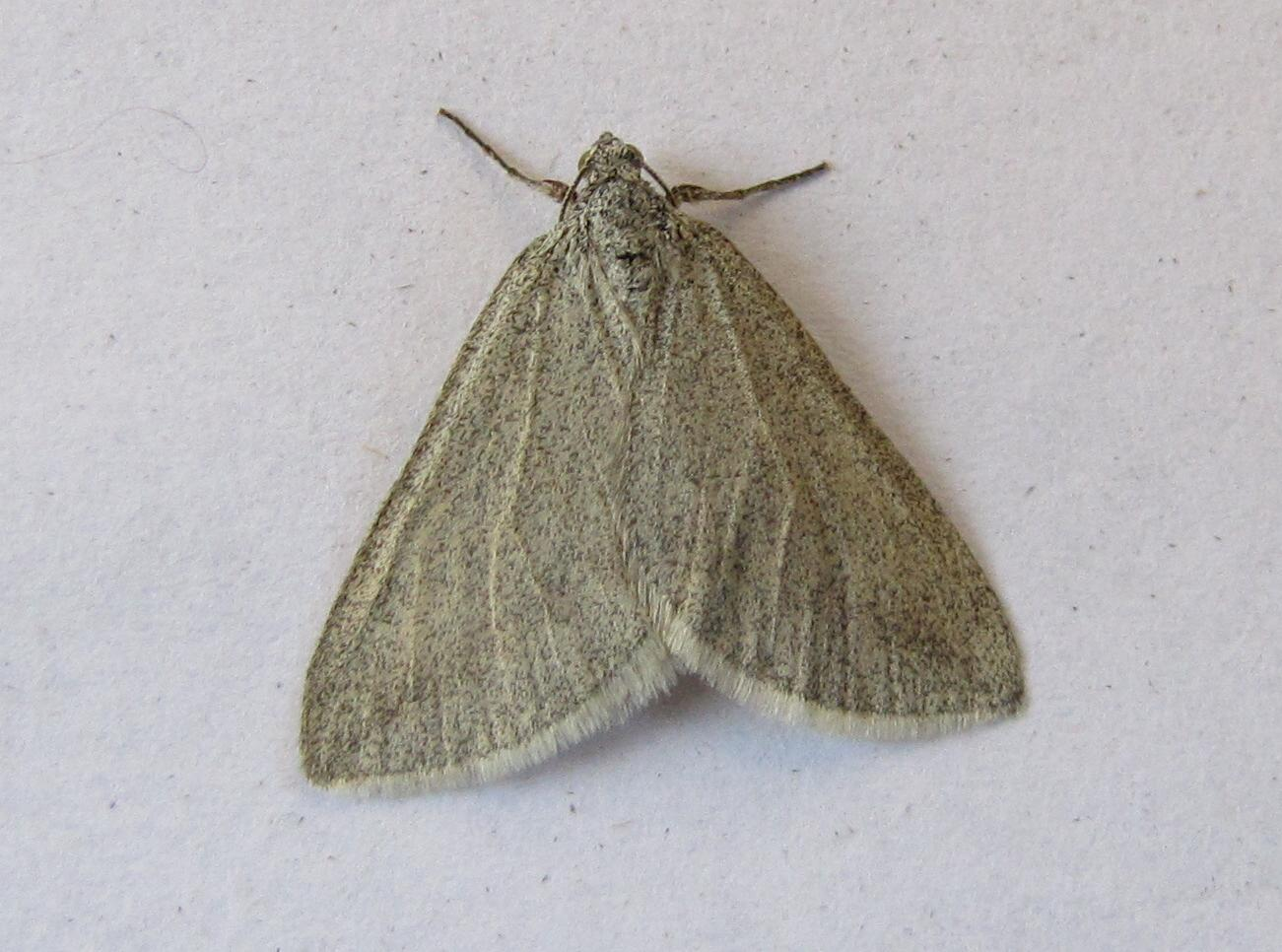
- Lithostege griseata

Scientific classification
- Kingdom: Animalia
- Phylum: Arthropoda
- Clade: Pancrustacea
- Class: Insecta
- Order: Lepidoptera
- Family: Geometridae
- Tribe: Chesiadini
- Genus: Lithostege; Hübner, 1825

= Lithostege =

Genus of moths

Lithostege is a genus of moths in the family Geometridae erected by Jacob Hübner in 1825.

== Species ==
- Lithostege amoenata Christoph, 1885
- Lithostege ancyrana Prout, 1938
- Lithostege angelicata Dyar, 1923
- Lithostege bosporaria (Herrich-Schäffer, 1847)
- Lithostege castiliaria Staudinger, 1877
- Lithostege coassata (Hübner, 1825)
- Lithostege deserticola Barnes & McDunnough, 1916
- Lithostege distinctata Christoph, 1887
- Lithostege duponchelli Prout, 1938
- Lithostege elegans (Grossbeck, 1909)
- Lithostege excelsata (Erschoff, 1874)
- Lithostege farinata (Hufnagel, 1767)
- Lithostege fissurata Mabille, 1888
- Lithostege fuscata (Grossbeck, 1906)
- Lithostege griseata (Denis & Schiffermüller, 1775)
- Lithostege infuscata (Eversmann, 1837)
- Lithostege luigi Viidalepp, 1992
- Lithostege luminosata Christoph, 1885
- Lithostege marcata Barnes & McDunnough, 1916
- Lithostege mesoleucata Püngeler, 1899
- Lithostege narynensis Prout, 1938
- Lithostege obliquata Urbahn, 1971
- Lithostege ochraceata Staudinger, 1901
- Lithostege odessaria (Boisduval, 1848)
- Lithostege palaestinensis Amsel, 1935
- Lithostege pallescens Staudinger, 1896
- Lithostege parva Stshetkin, 1963
- Lithostege rotundata Packard, 1874
- Lithostege senata Christoph, 1887
- Lithostege staudingeri Erschoff, 1874
- Lithostege turkmenica Tsvetajev, 1971
- Lithostege usgentaria Christoph, 1885
