= Lithostege fuscata =

Scientific classification
- Kingdom: Animalia
- Phylum: Arthropoda
- Clade: Pancrustacea
- Class: Insecta
- Order: Lepidoptera
- Family: Geometridae
- Genus: Lithostege
- Species: L. fuscata

Binomial name
- Lithostege fuscata (Grossbeck, 1906)

Synonyms
- Eucestia fuscata Grossbeck, 1906

Species of moth

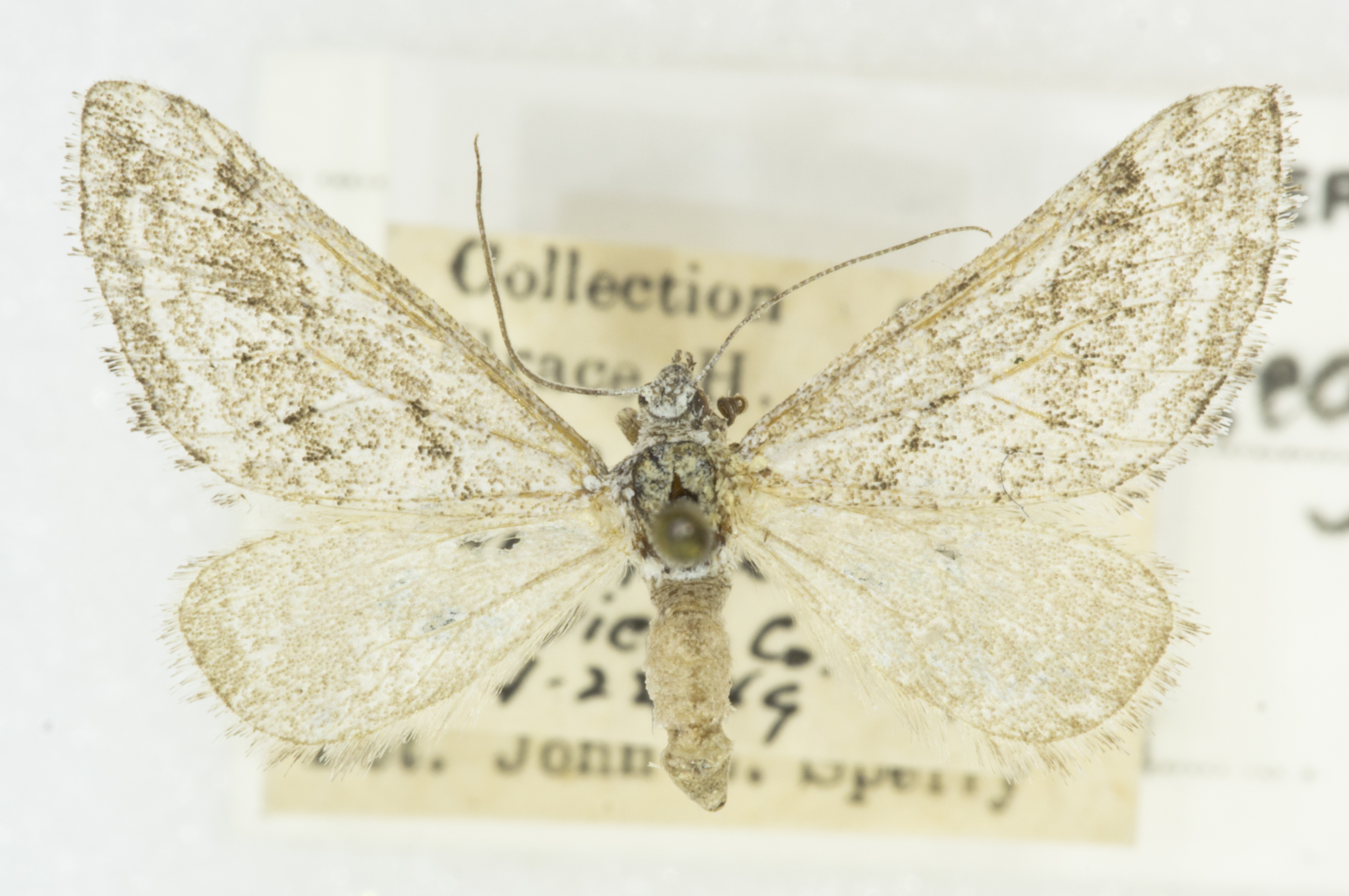

Lithostege fuscata is a species of geometrid moth in the family Geometridae. It is found in North America.

The MONA or Hodges number for Lithostege fuscata is 7629.
