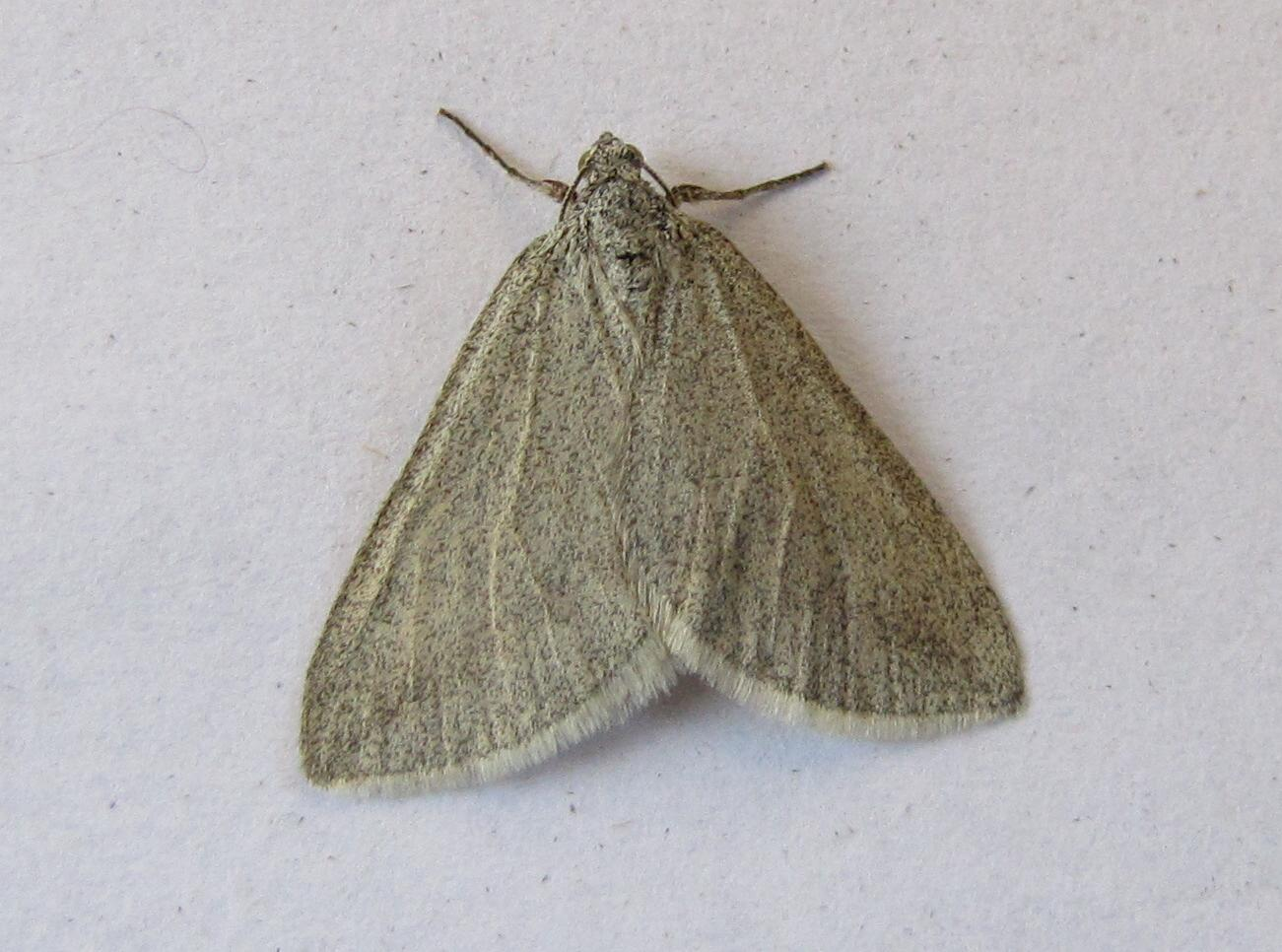

Scientific classification
- Domain: Eukaryota
- Kingdom: Animalia
- Phylum: Arthropoda
- Class: Insecta
- Order: Lepidoptera
- Family: Geometridae
- Genus: Lithostege
- Species: L. griseata

Binomial name
- Lithostege griseata (Denis & Schiffermüller, 1775)

Synonyms
- Geometra griseata Denis & Schiffermuller, 1775

= Lithostege griseata =

Species of moth

Lithostege griseata, the grey carpet, is a moth of the family Geometridae. The species was first described by Michael Denis and Ignaz Schiffermüller in 1775. It is found in most of Europe, from Great Britain and the Iberian Peninsula to the Ural Mountains and further east to central Asia and Transcaucasia, Asia Minor and the Near East.

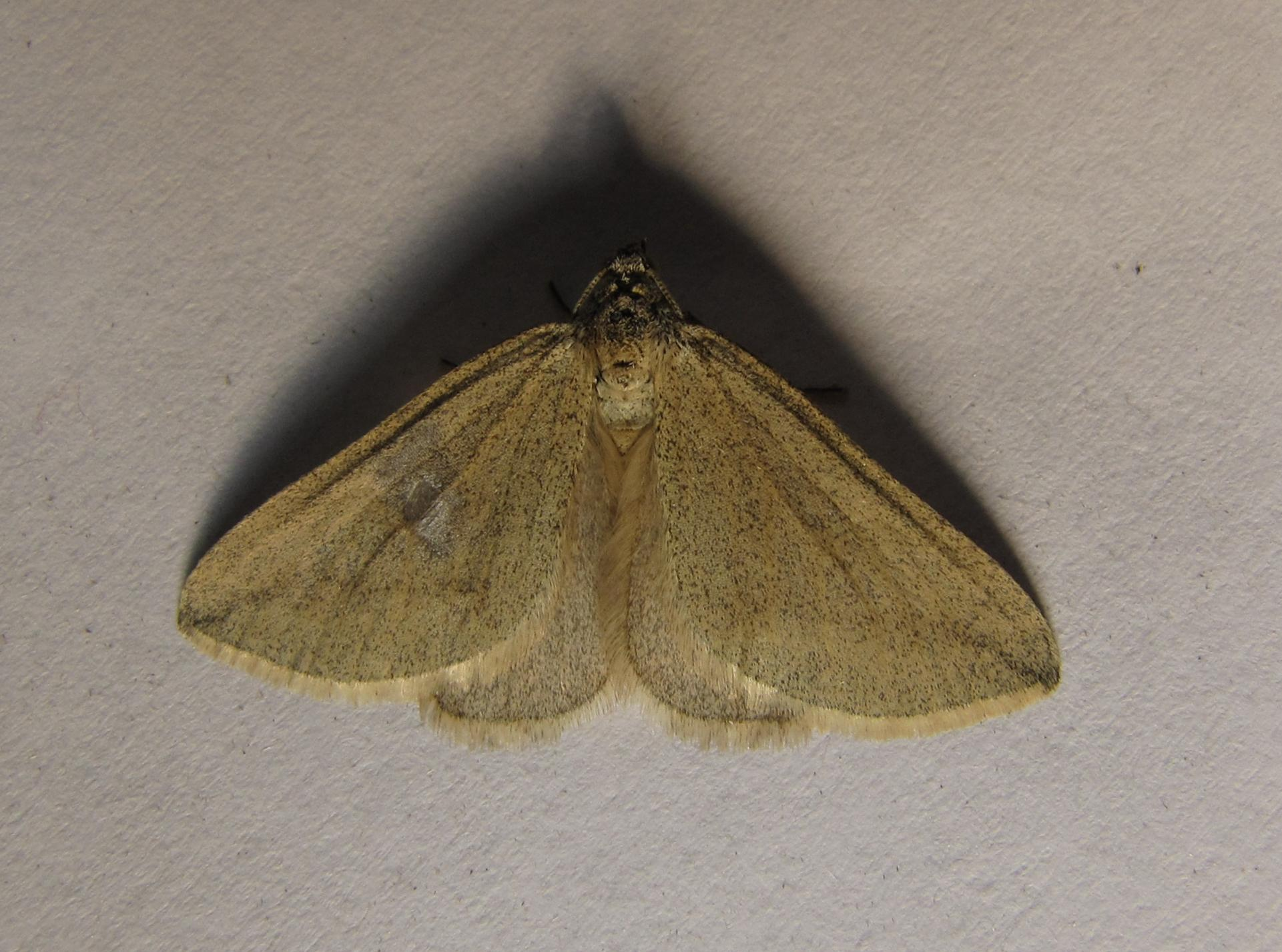
Bright brown colour variant

The wingspan is 28–31 mm (1.1–1.2 in). Adults are on wing from May to July. The larvae feed on the developing seeds of Descurainia sophia and Erysimum cheiranthoides.

== Subspecies ==
- Lithostege griseata griseata (Denis & Schiffermüller, 1775)
- Lithostege griseata cycnaria Guenée, 1858
