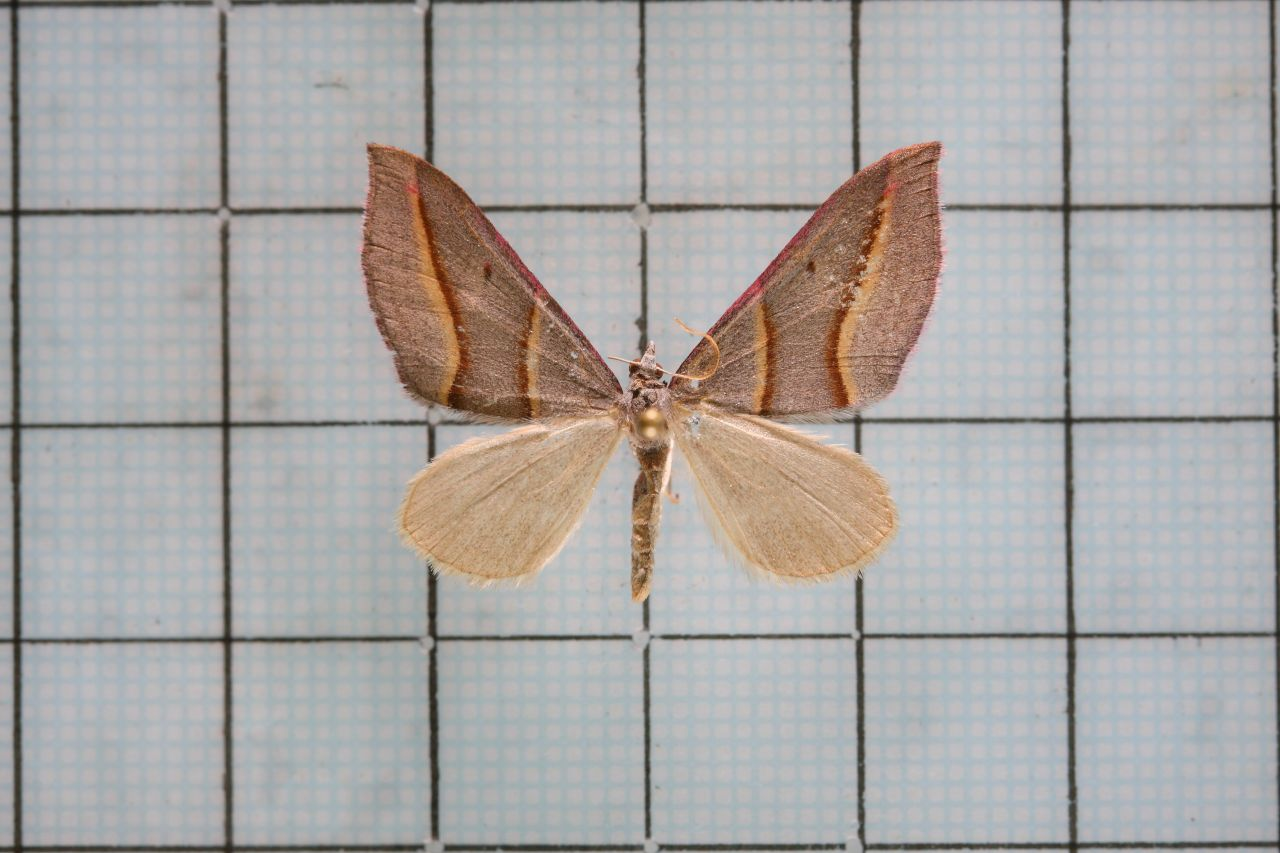
- Docirava flavilinata

Scientific classification
- Kingdom: Animalia
- Phylum: Arthropoda
- Class: Insecta
- Order: Lepidoptera
- Family: Geometridae
- Tribe: Chesiadini
- Genus: Docirava; Walker, [1863]

= Docirava =

Genus of moths

Docirava is a genus of moths in the family Geometridae.

== Species ==
- Docirava aequilineata Walker, [1863]
- Docirava affinis Warren, 1894
- Docirava flavilinata Wileman, 1915
- Docirava vastata (Walker, 1866)
