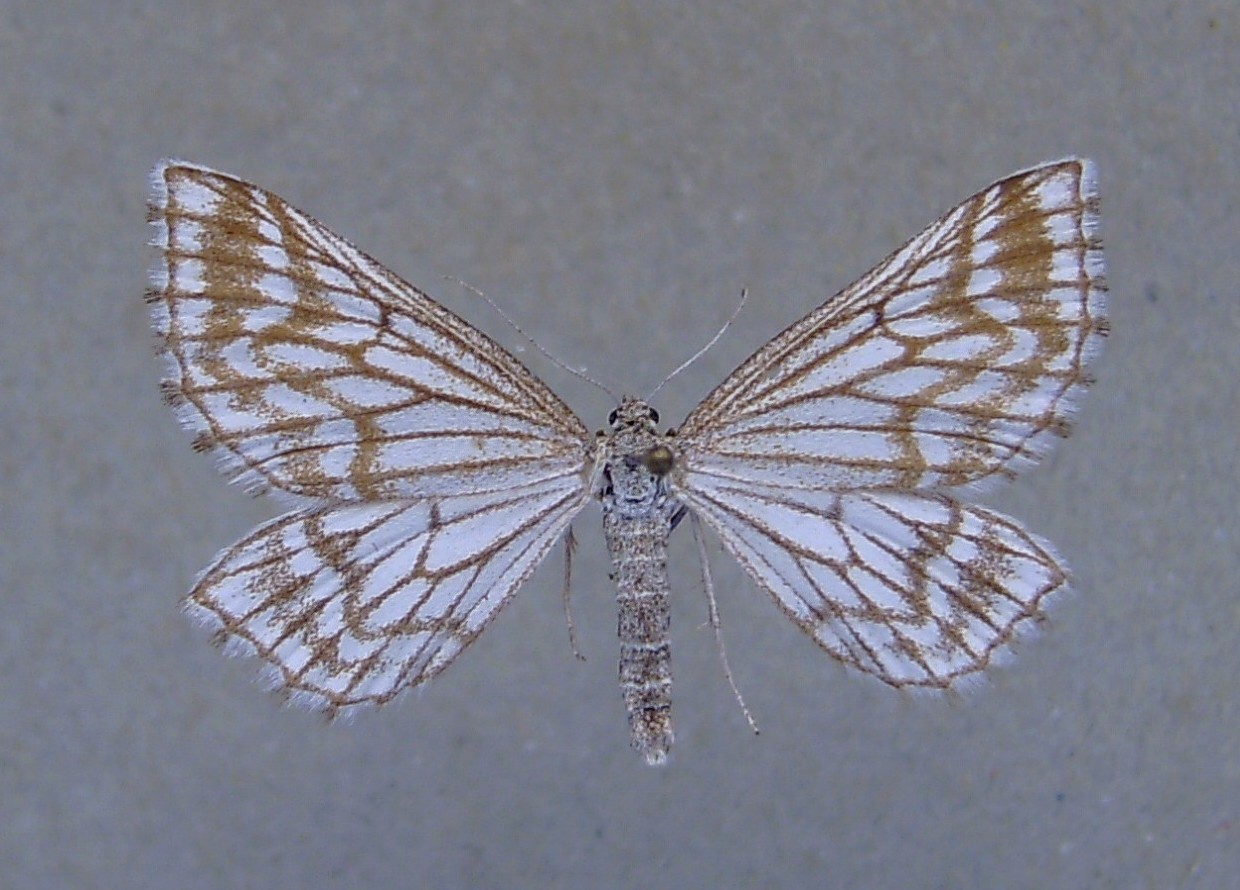
- Schistostege decussata

Scientific classification
- Kingdom: Animalia
- Phylum: Arthropoda
- Clade: Pancrustacea
- Class: Insecta
- Order: Lepidoptera
- Family: Geometridae
- Tribe: Chesiadini
- Genus: Schistostege; Hübner, 1825

= Schistostege =

Genus of moths

Schistostege is a genus of moths in the family Geometridae erected by Jacob Hübner in 1825.

== Species ==
- Schistostege decussata (Denis & Schiffermüller, 1775)
- Schistostege nubilaria (Hübner, 1799)
