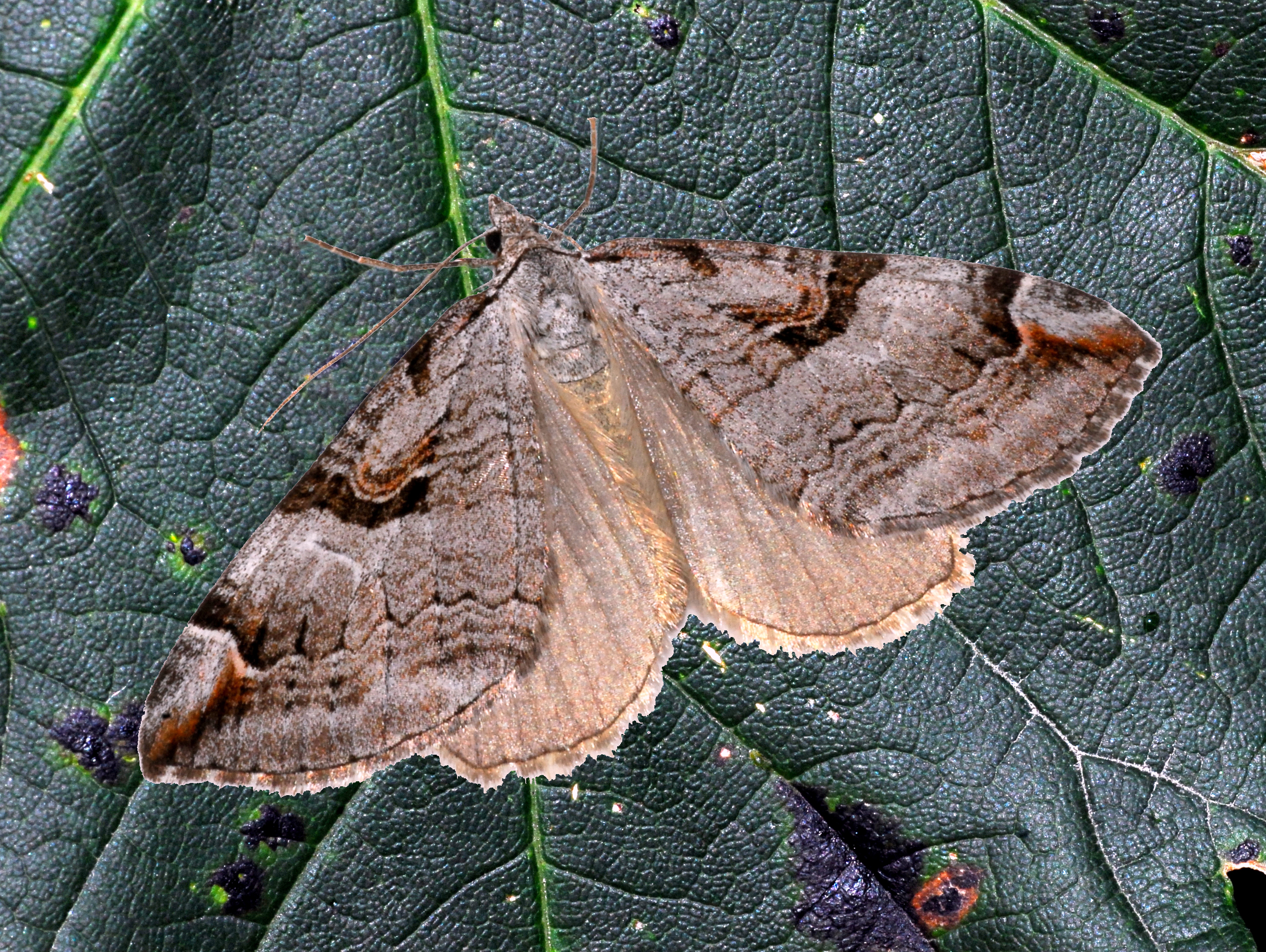
- Moth of Aplocera praeformata

Scientific classification
- Kingdom: Animalia
- Phylum: Arthropoda
- Class: Insecta
- Order: Lepidoptera
- Family: Geometridae
- Genus: Aplocera
- Species: A. praeformata

Binomial name
- Aplocera praeformata (Hübner, 1826)

Synonyms
- Anaitis praeformaria Boisduval, 1840; Anaitis praeformata Kiefer, 1913; Anaitis rosacea Kiefer, 1913; Aplocera praeformata (Hubner, 1826); Geometra praeformata Hubner, 1826; Larentia cassiata Treitschke, 1828; Larentia cassiata Treitschke, 1828

= Aplocera praeformata =

Purple treble-bar

Species of moth

Aplocera praeformata, known as the purple treble-bar, is a species of moth in the family Geometridae.

== Subspecies ==
Subspecies include:

- Aplocera praeformata gibeauxi Leraut, 1995
- Aplocera praeformata praeformata (Hübner, 1826)
- Aplocera praeformata urbahni Dufay, 1981

== Distribution and habitat ==
This species is present from the Iberian Peninsula and France, through Western Europe, over Central Europe, to Russia. Its northernmost range is southern Finland and the Baltic States. The subspecies Aplocera praeformata urbahni is found in Greece. In the Alps it is found to heights of up to 2,000 meters.

== Description ==
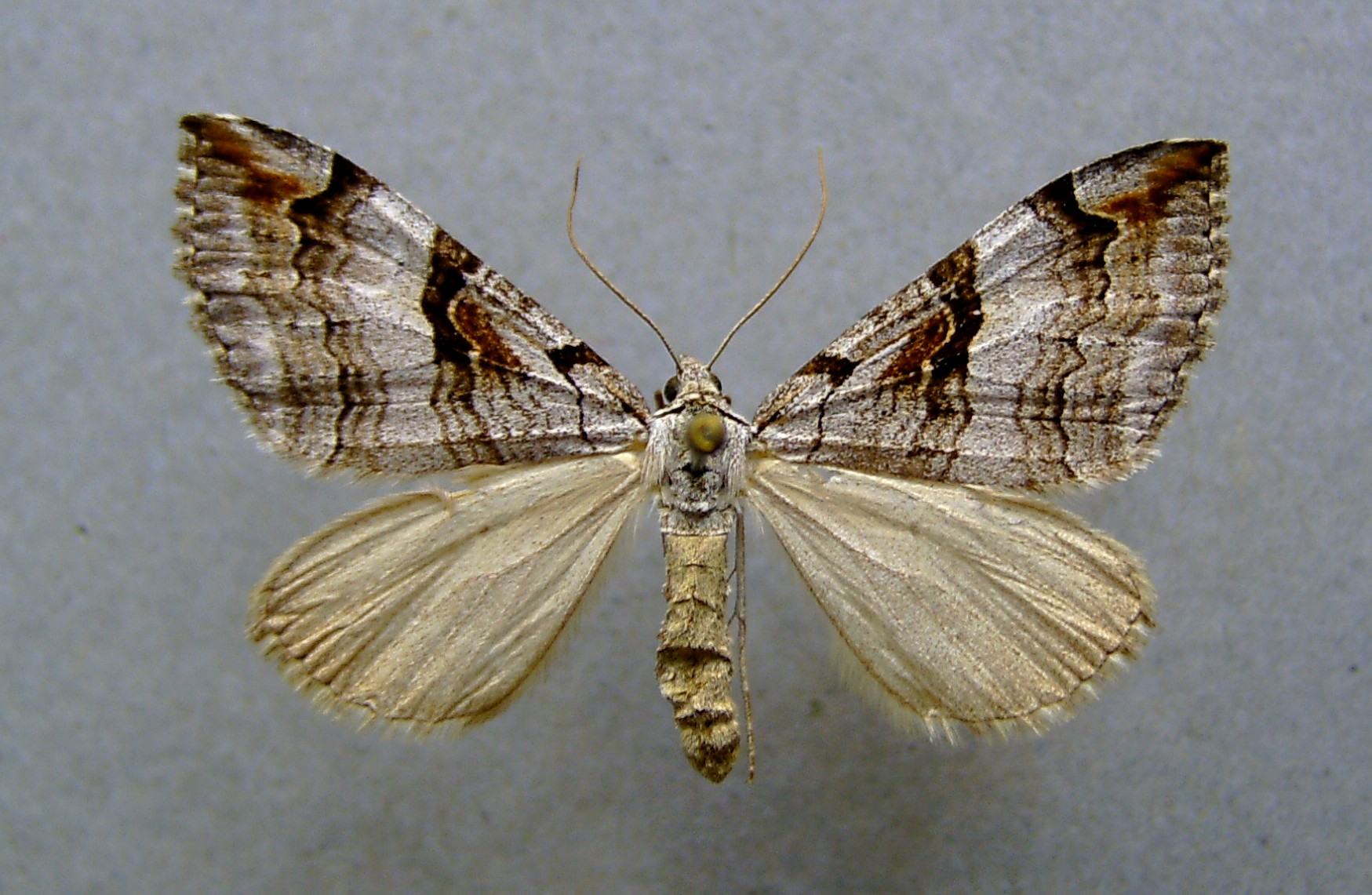
Mounted specimen

Aplocera praeformata has a wingspan of 34–44 mm. The forewings have a gray to blue-gray basic color. They show various bands of dark transverse lines. A red-brown stain extends towards the wing tip. The hind wings are monochrome gray-white without any drawing.

This species is rather similar to Aplocera plagiata.

== Biology ==
Adults are on the wing from June to August. This species has one generation a year univoltine. The caterpillars are gray-brown, with a white side line and a dark lower edge. The larvae feed on Hypericum species (St. John's worts), such as Hypericum maculatum and Hypericum perforatum.
