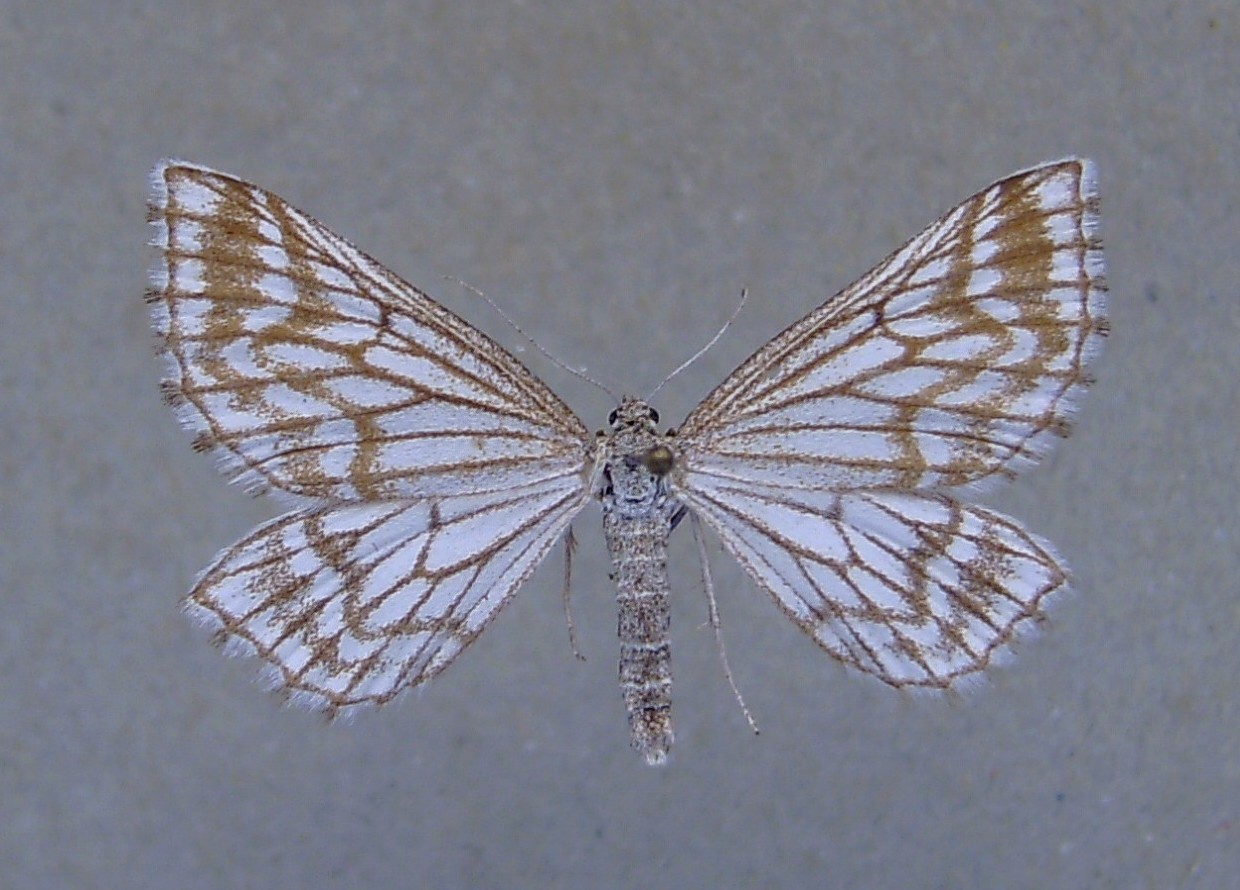
- White form
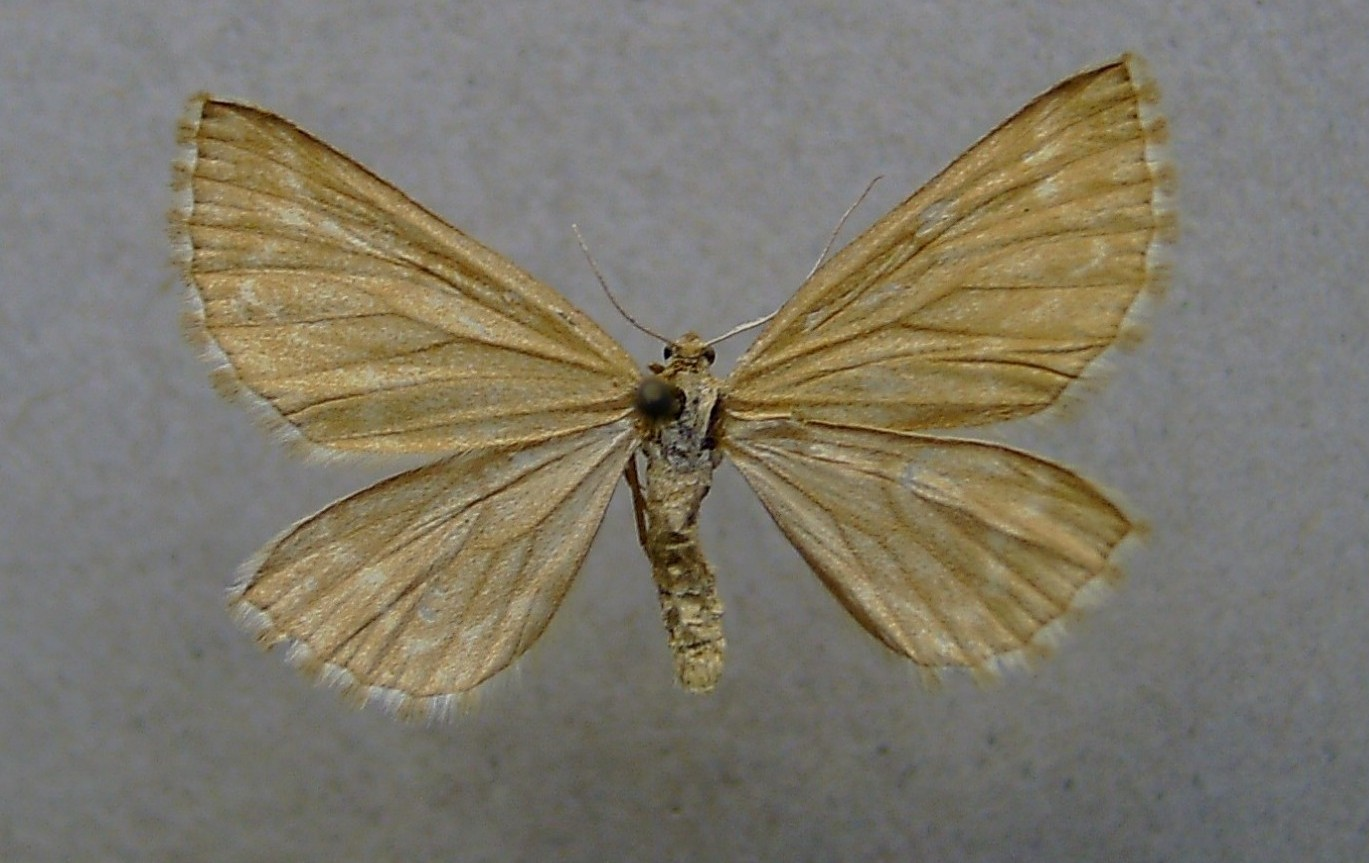
- Yellow-brown form

Scientific classification
- Domain: Eukaryota
- Kingdom: Animalia
- Phylum: Arthropoda
- Class: Insecta
- Order: Lepidoptera
- Family: Geometridae
- Genus: Schistostege
- Species: S. decussata

Binomial name
- Schistostege decussata (Denis & Schiffermüller, 1775)

Synonyms
- Geometra decussata Denis & Schiffermuller, 1775; Schistostege dioszeghyi Kovacs, 1957; Schistostege forsteri Vojnits, 1973; Schistostege transiens Stauder, 1920; Schistostege treitsschkei Kovacs, 1957; Siona dinarica Schawerda 1913; Schistostege flavata Barajon, 1952; Schistostege lugubrata Hartig, 1971; Schistostege rumelica Rebel & Zerny, 1931

= Schistostege decussata =

Species of moth

Schistostege decussata is a moth of the family Geometridae. It is found in south-eastern and eastern Europe up to Ukraine. In Hungary and Lower Austria, the yellow-brown form is found.

The wingspan is 24–32 mm. Adults are on wing from June to July.

The larvae mainly feed on Euphorbia and Taraxacum species. Larvae can be found from April to June.

== Subspecies ==
- Schistostege decussata decussata
- Schistostege decussata dinarica (Schawerda 1913)
- Schistostege decussata flavata Barajon, 1952
- Schistostege decussata lugubrata Hartig, 1971
- Schistostege decussata rumelica Rebel & Zerny, 1931
