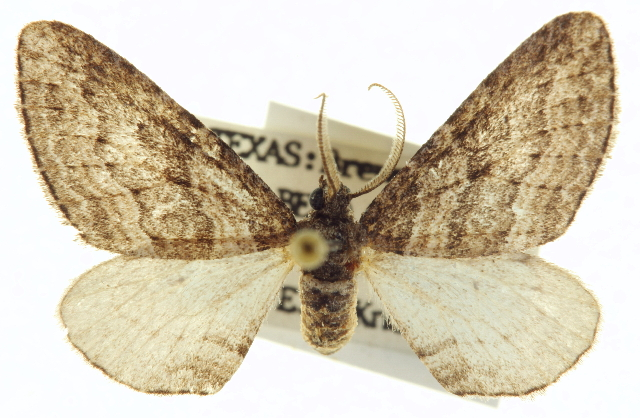

Scientific classification
- Kingdom: Animalia
- Phylum: Arthropoda
- Clade: Pancrustacea
- Class: Insecta
- Order: Lepidoptera
- Family: Geometridae
- Genus: Lithostege
- Species: L. marcata

Binomial name
- Lithostege marcata Barnes & McDunnough, 1916

= Lithostege marcata =

Species of moth

Lithostege marcata is a species of moth in the family Geometridae first described by William Barnes and James Halliday McDunnough in 1916. It is found in North America.

The MONA or Hodges number for Lithostege marcata is 7630.
