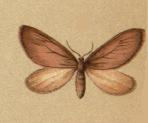

Scientific classification
- Kingdom: Animalia
- Phylum: Arthropoda
- Class: Insecta
- Order: Lepidoptera
- Family: Geometridae
- Tribe: Chesiadini
- Genus: Chesistege; Viidalepp, 1990
- Species: C. korbi

Binomial name
- Chesistege korbi (Bohatsch, 1909)

Synonyms
- Chesias korbi Bohatsch, 1909; Chesias taurica Wehrli, 1938; Chesistege kopetdagica Viidalepp, 1990

= Chesistege =

Genus of moths

Chesistege is a genus of moths in the family Geometridae. It contains only one species, Chesistege korbi, which is found in Turkey, Armenia and Turkmenistan.

== Subspecies ==
- Chesistege korbi korbi
- Chesistege korbi kopetdagica Viidalepp, 1992
- Chesistege korbi taurica (Wehrli, 1938)
