= Újezd (Znojmo District) =

- Municipality
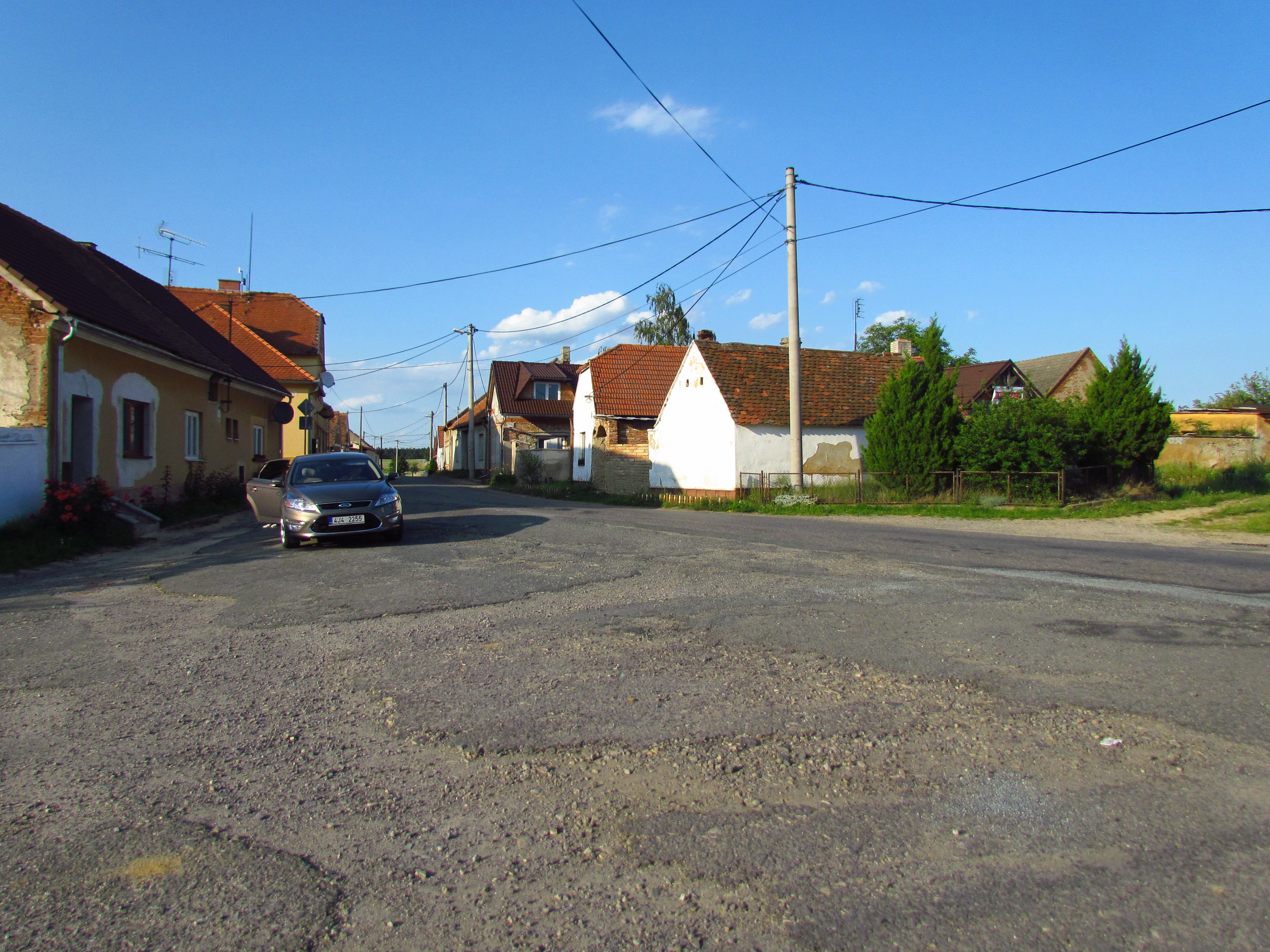
- Upper part of Újezd

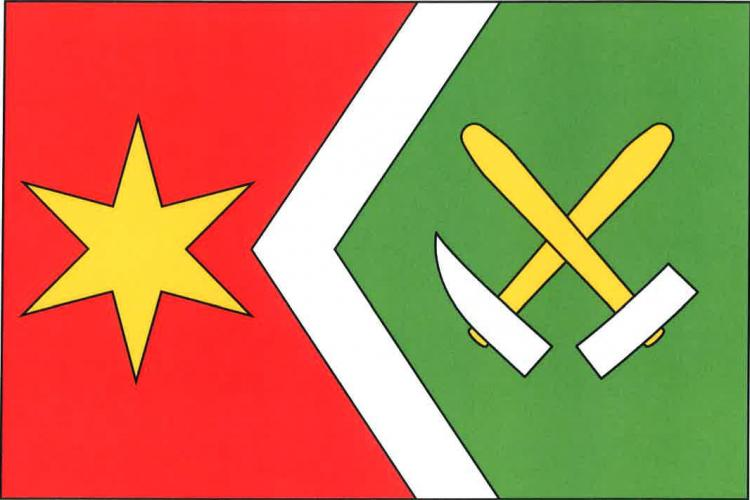
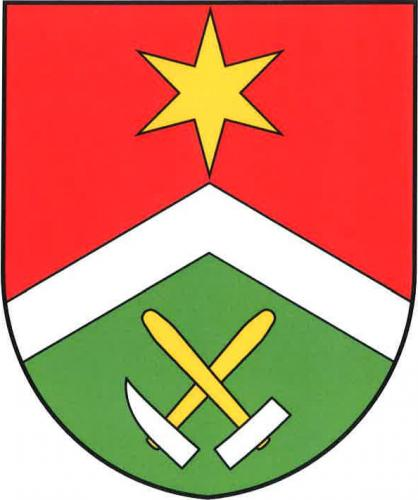
- Flag Coat of arms

- Location in the Czech Republic
- Coordinates: 49°1′25″N 16°3′12″E
- Country: Czech Republic
- Region: South Moravian
- District: Znojmo
- First mentioned: 1320

Area
  - Total: 5.73 km^{2} (2.21 sq mi)
- Elevation: 411 m (1,348 ft)

Population (2026-01-01)
  - Total: 105
  - Density: 18.3/km^{2} (47.5/sq mi)
- Time zone: UTC+1 (CET)
  - Summer (DST): UTC+2 (CEST)
- Postal code: 671 40
- Website: www.ujezduznojma.cz

Újezd is a municipality and village in Znojmo District in the South Moravian Region of the Czech Republic. It has about 100 inhabitants.

Újezd lies approximately 20 kilometres (12 mi) north of Znojmo, 46 km (29 mi) south-west of Brno, and 167 km (104 mi) south-east of Prague.

== Demographics ==
Historical population
Year	Pop.	±%
1869	523	—
1880	516	−1.3%
1890	466	−9.7%
1900	452	−3.0%
1910	492	+8.8%
1921	501	+1.8%
1930	416	−17.0%
1950	332	−20.2%
1961	255	−23.2%
1970	197	−22.7%
1980	126	−36.0%
1991	71	−43.7%
2001	79	+11.3%
2011	84	+6.3%
2021	73	−13.1%
Source: Censuses

== Notable people ==
- Karl Schawerda (1869–1945), Austrian entomologist
