= Chesias capriata =

Scientific classification
- Kingdom: Animalia
- Phylum: Arthropoda
- Class: Insecta
- Order: Lepidoptera
- Family: Geometridae
- Genus: Chesias
- Species: C. capriata

Binomial name
- Chesias capriata Prout, 1904

Species of moth

Chesias capriata is a moth of the family Geometridae. It was described by Prout in 1904. It is found in Croatia, Italy, Slovenia and on Sardinia and Sicily.
