= Amygdaloptera =

Scientific classification
- Kingdom: Animalia
- Phylum: Arthropoda
- Class: Insecta
- Order: Lepidoptera
- Family: Geometridae
- Tribe: Chesiadini
- Genus: Amygdaloptera; Gumppenberg, 1887
- Species: A. testaria

Binomial name
- Amygdaloptera testaria Fabricius, 1794

Monotypic genus of geometer moths

Amygdaloptera is a monotypic moth genus in the family Geometridae described by Carl Freiherr von Gumppenberg in 1887. Its single species, Amygdaloptera testaria, first described by Johan Christian Fabricius in 1794, is found in south-western Europe.
