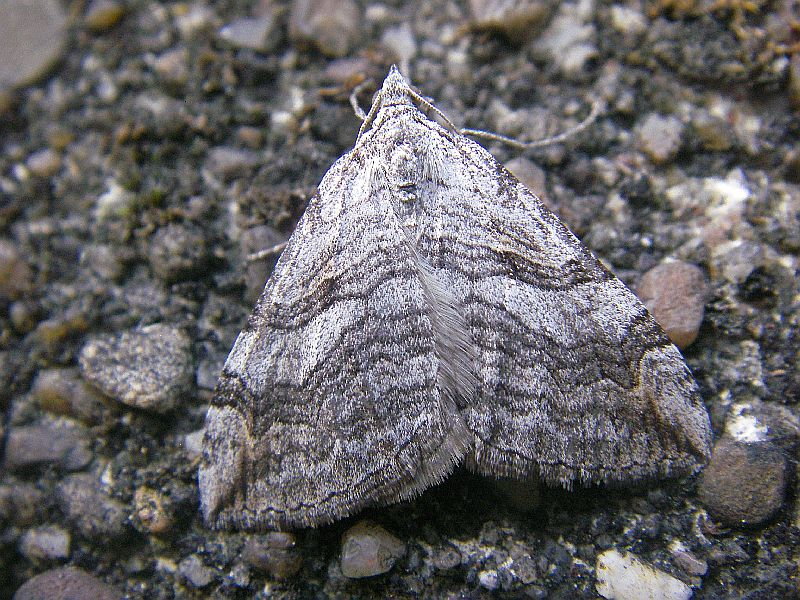

Scientific classification
- Kingdom: Animalia
- Phylum: Arthropoda
- Clade: Pancrustacea
- Class: Insecta
- Order: Lepidoptera
- Family: Geometridae
- Genus: Aplocera
- Species: A. efformata

Binomial name
- Aplocera efformata (Guenée, 1858)

Synonyms
- Anaitis efformata Guenée, 1858; Aplocera britonata Leraut, 1995

= Aplocera efformata =

Species of moth

Aplocera efformata, the lesser treble-bar, is a moth of the family Geometridae. The species was first described by Achille Guenée in 1858. It is known from Europe, Morocco and Anatolia.

It has a wingspan of 35–41 mm. Its wings are shades of brown and gray with three cross-lines (submedial, medial, and postmedial) with faint cross bars.

== Similar species ==
Aplocera efformata is difficult to certainly distinguish from its congener Aplocera plagiata. It is best distinguished with the innermost of the wing's three dark cross-bands are fairly straight with a marked bend near the front edge, not evenly curved. Moreover, it is mostly slightly smaller, the base colour of the forewing is slightly lighter and the cross-bands slightly darker coloured, so that they seem more pronounced, and the slash at the wing tip is lighter in colour, brownish, not black. The forewings are pointed, light grey with three dark grey cross-bands. The innermost of these is double, quite straight with a marked kink near the front edge. The two outermost are triple and evenly curved. the outermost cross band has two, more or less marked triangular projections on the outer side. At the wing tip there is a short, slightly diffuse, brownish slash. The hindwings are greyish-white. See Townsend et al.

The abdominal apex can also be compared. In male A. plagiata, the tip of the abdomen is pointed, while it is blunt in A. efformata. There are also differences in genitalia.

There are two to three generations per year with adults on wing from the end of April to mid-November.

The larvae feed on Hypericum perforatum (St John's wort). Larvae can be found from June to August and from September to May. It overwinters in the larval stage. Pupation takes place beneath the soil.

== Subspecies ==
- Aplocera efformata efformata
- Aplocera efformata britonata Leraut, 1995
