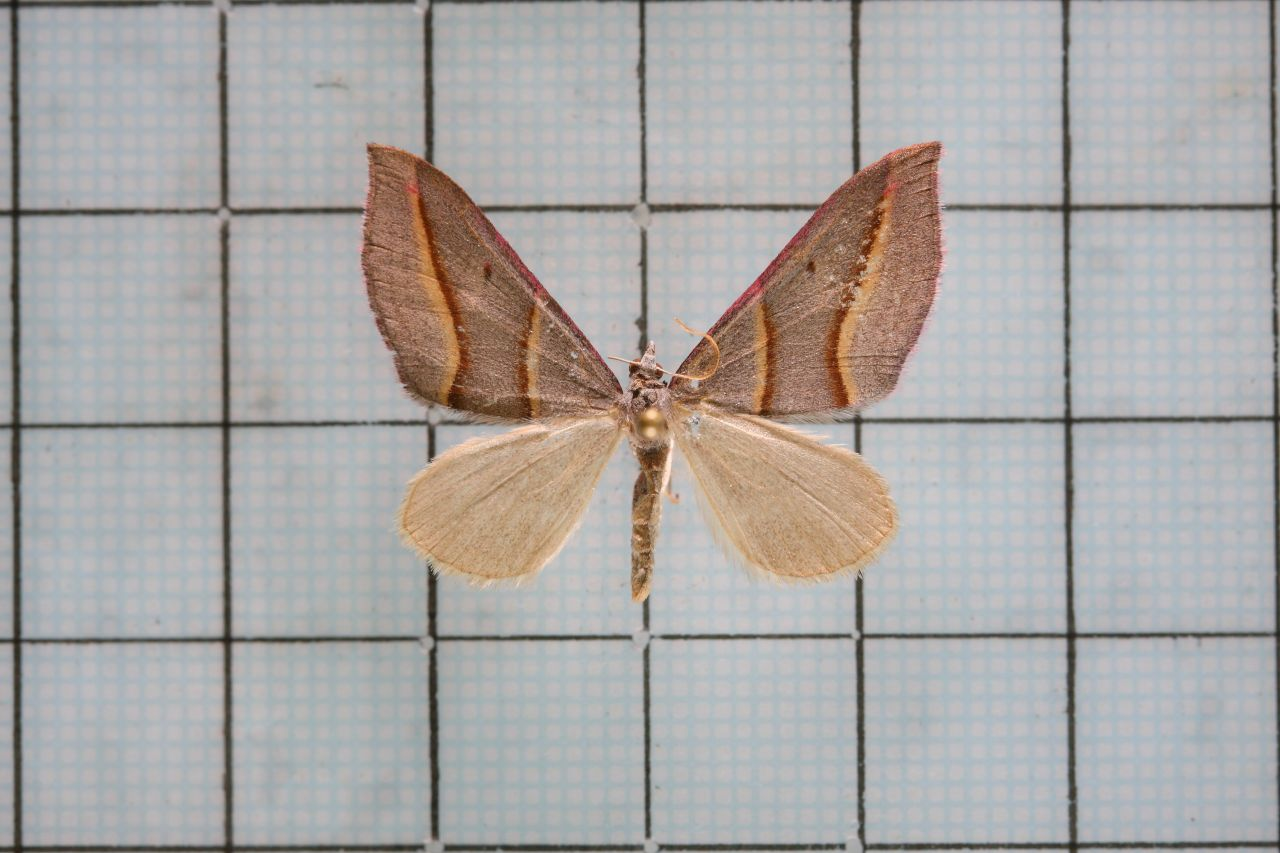

Scientific classification
- Kingdom: Animalia
- Phylum: Arthropoda
- Class: Insecta
- Order: Lepidoptera
- Family: Geometridae
- Genus: Docirava
- Species: D. flavilinata

Binomial name
- Docirava flavilinata Wileman, 1915

= Docirava flavilinata =

Species of moth

Docirava flavilinata is a moth of the family Geometridae. It is found in Taiwan.
