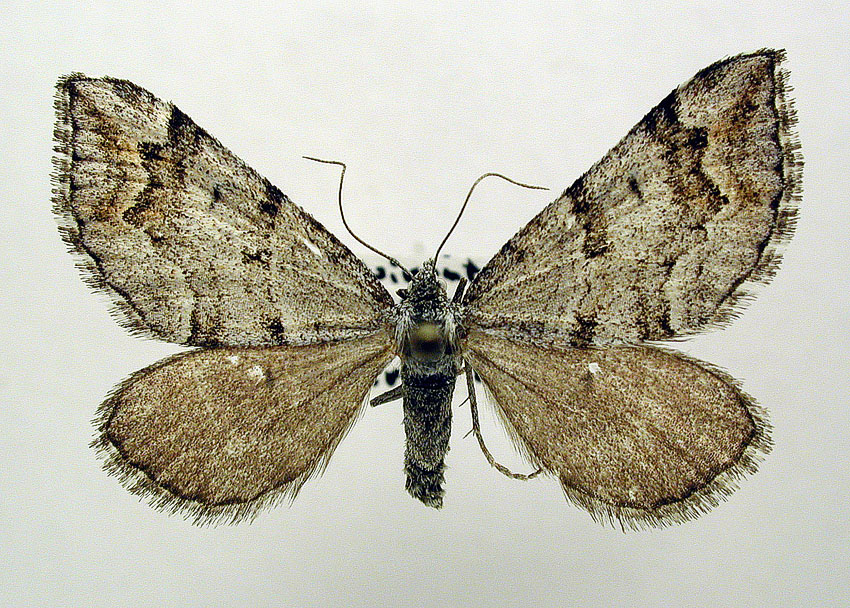
- Carsia sororiata

Scientific classification
- Kingdom: Animalia
- Phylum: Arthropoda
- Clade: Pancrustacea
- Class: Insecta
- Order: Lepidoptera
- Family: Geometridae
- Tribe: Chesiadini
- Genus: Carsia; Hübner, 1825

Synonyms
- Celma Stephens, 1831

= Carsia =

Genus of moths

Carsia is a genus of moths in the family Geometridae erected by Jacob Hübner in 1825.

== Species ==
- Carsia lythoxylata (Hübner, 1799)
- Carsia perpetuata (Lederer, 1870)
- Carsia sororiata (Hübner, 1813) – Manchester treble-bar
