= Chesias rhegmatica =

Scientific classification
- Domain: Eukaryota
- Kingdom: Animalia
- Phylum: Arthropoda
- Class: Insecta
- Order: Lepidoptera
- Family: Geometridae
- Genus: Chesias
- Species: C. rhegmatica

Binomial name
- Chesias rhegmatica Prout, 1937

Species of moth

Chesias rhegmatica is a moth of the family Geometridae. It was described by Prout in 1937. It is endemic to Cyprus.
