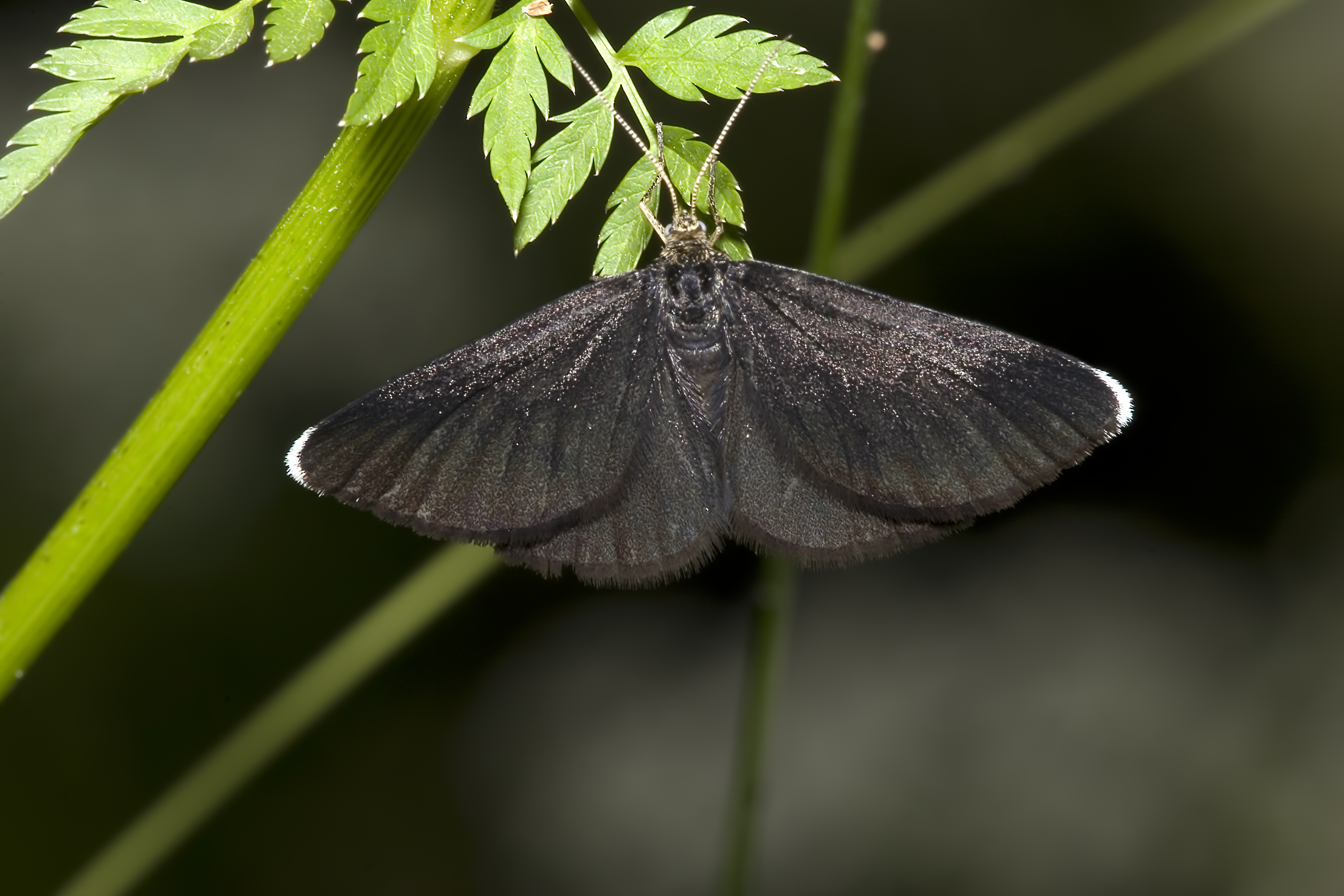

Scientific classification
- Kingdom: Animalia
- Phylum: Arthropoda
- Class: Insecta
- Order: Lepidoptera
- Family: Geometridae
- Tribe: Chesiadini
- Genus: Odezia; Boisduval, 1840
- Species: O. atrata

Binomial name
- Odezia atrata (Linnaeus, 1758)

= Odezia =

Genus of moths

Odezia is a monotypic moth genus in the family Geometridae erected by Jean Baptiste Boisduval in 1840. Its only species, Odezia atrata, the chimney sweeper, was first described by Carl Linnaeus in his 1758 10th edition of Systema Naturae. It is found in the Palearctic.

== Distribution ==
In Europe its range extends from the Iberian Peninsula through western and central Europe and the British Isles. Further east to Sakhalin and the Amur-Ussuri region. In the north, the limit is central Fennoscandia. To the south it occurs from Italy to the Balkans. In Austria, the previously mass-occurring species has become today in many places rare; many populations have disappeared.

The wingspan is 23–27 mm. The length of the forewings is 12–15 mm. Almost entirely black, the extreme apex and apical fringe of the forewing white. In O. a. pyrenaica, from the Pyrenees and central Italy, the wings, but especially the forewing, are more or less strongly dusted with brownish yellow. In ab. O. a. nigerrima, Paul Thierry-Mieg described from a single female without exact locality, the white apex and apical fringe are absent.

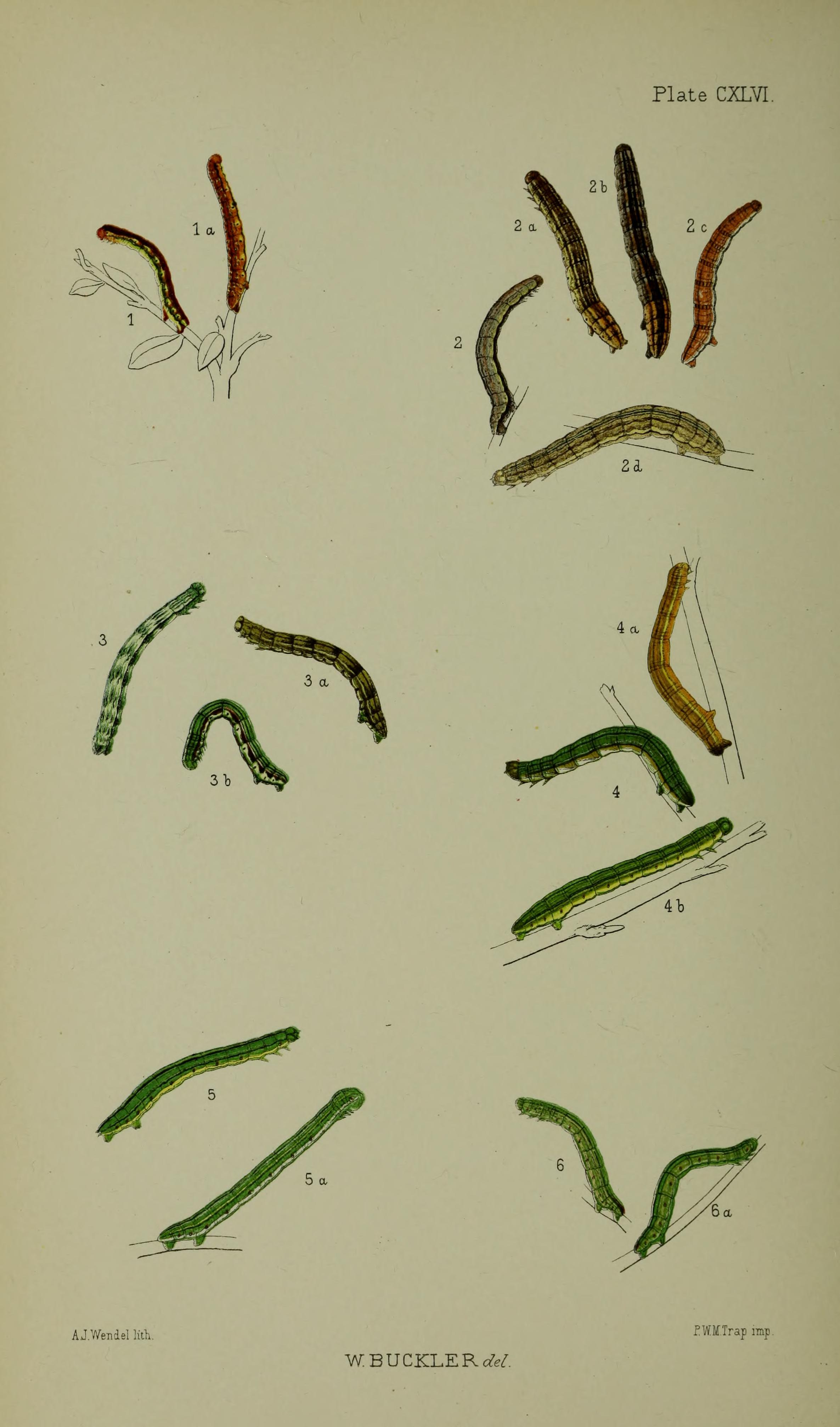
Figs.6, 6a larvae after final moult

== Biology ==
The moth flies from June to August, generally during the day, preferably with bright sunshine. The larva feeds mainly on pignut (Conopodium majus). Habitats are ditch edges, meadows, bogs, moors and lake sides.

== Notes ==
1. The flight season refers to Belgium and the Netherlands. This may vary in other parts of the range.
