= Lithostege elegans =

Scientific classification
- Domain: Eukaryota
- Kingdom: Animalia
- Phylum: Arthropoda
- Class: Insecta
- Order: Lepidoptera
- Family: Geometridae
- Genus: Lithostege
- Species: L. elegans

Binomial name
- Lithostege elegans (Grossbeck, 1909)

Synonyms
- Coenocalpe elegans Grossbeck, 1909

Species of moth

Lithostege elegans is a species of moth in the family Geometridae. It is found in North America, where it has been recorded from Arizona.

The wingspan is about 25 mm.
