= Lithostege deserticola =

Scientific classification
- Domain: Eukaryota
- Kingdom: Animalia
- Phylum: Arthropoda
- Class: Insecta
- Order: Lepidoptera
- Family: Geometridae
- Genus: Lithostege
- Species: L. deserticola

Binomial name
- Lithostege deserticola Barnes & McDunnough, 1916

Species of moth

Lithostege deserticola is a species of moth in the family Geometridae first described by William Barnes and James Halliday McDunnough in 1916. It is found in North America.

The MONA or Hodges number for Lithostege deserticola is 7633.
