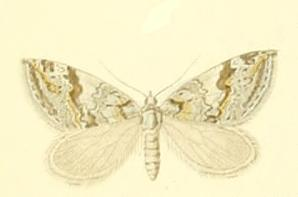

Scientific classification
- Domain: Eukaryota
- Kingdom: Animalia
- Phylum: Arthropoda
- Class: Insecta
- Order: Lepidoptera
- Family: Geometridae
- Genus: Chesias
- Species: C. linogrisearia

Binomial name
- Chesias linogrisearia Constant, 1888

= Chesias linogrisearia =

Species of moth

Chesias linogrisearia is a moth of the family Geometridae. It is found on Sardinia.
