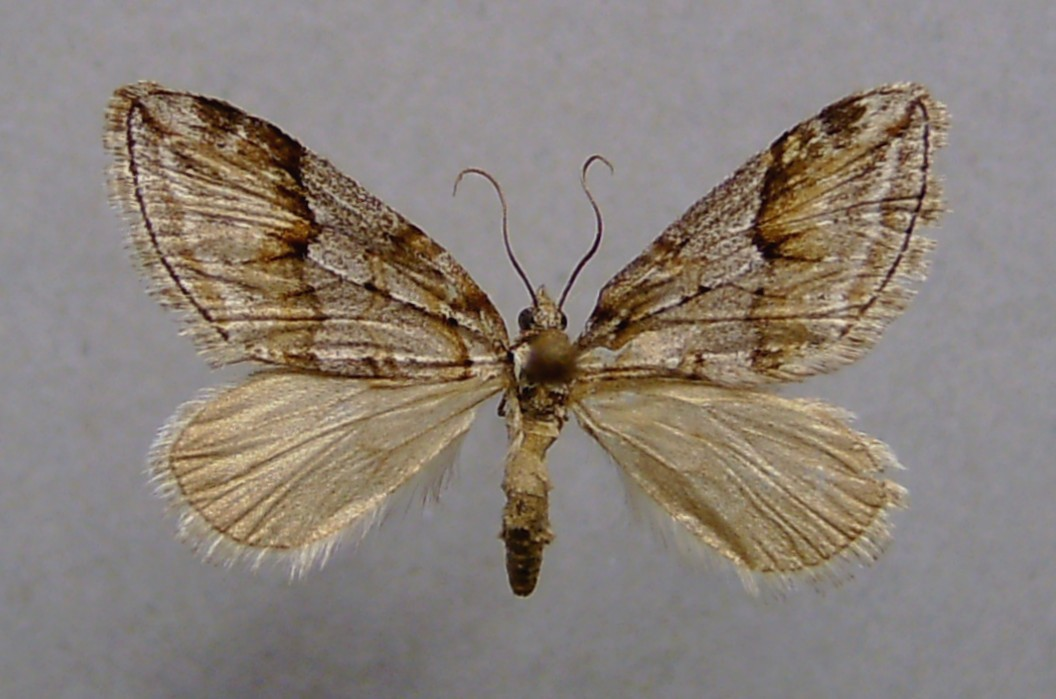
- Chesias rufata

Scientific classification
- Domain: Eukaryota
- Kingdom: Animalia
- Phylum: Arthropoda
- Class: Insecta
- Order: Lepidoptera
- Family: Geometridae
- Tribe: Chesiadini
- Genus: Chesias; Treitschke, 1825

= Chesias =

Genus of moths

Chesias is a genus of moths in the family Geometridae described by Treitschke in 1825.

== Selected species ==
- Chesias angeri Schawerda, 1919
- Chesias capriata Prout, 1904
- Chesias isabella Schawerda, 1915
- Chesias legatella (Denis & Schiffermüller, 1775) – the streak
- Chesias linogrisearia Constant, 1888
- Chesias rhegmatica Prout, 1937
- Chesias rufata (Fabricius, 1775) – broom-tip
