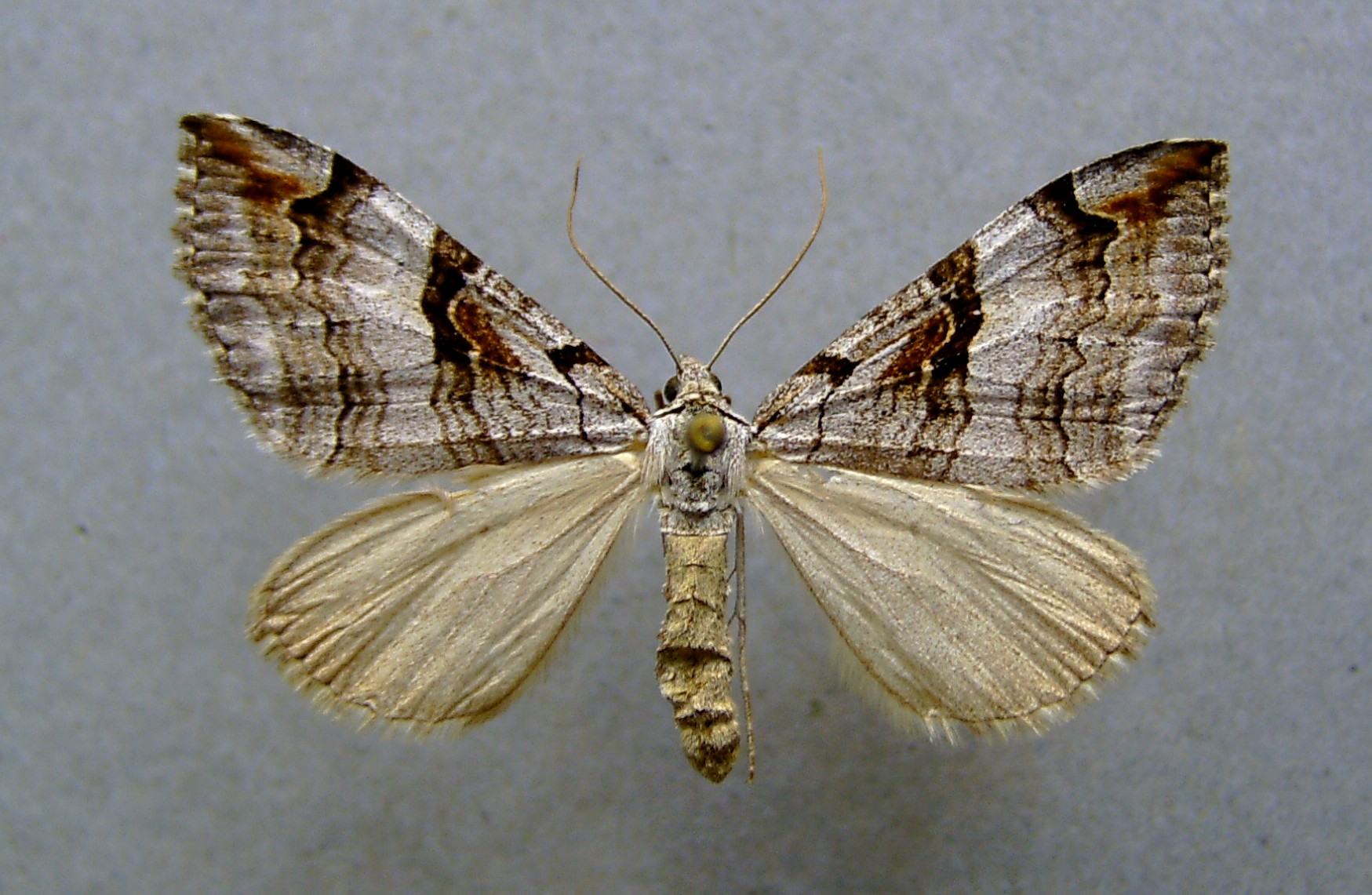
- Aplocera praeformata

Scientific classification
- Kingdom: Animalia
- Phylum: Arthropoda
- Class: Insecta
- Order: Lepidoptera
- Family: Geometridae
- Tribe: Chesiadini
- Genus: Aplocera; Stephens, 1827

= Aplocera =

Genus of geometer moths

Aplocera is a genus of moths of the family Geometridae.

== Species ==
- Aplocera aequilineata (Walker, 1863)
- Aplocera annexata (Freyer, 1830)
- Aplocera bohatschi (Püngeler, 1914)
- Aplocera columbata (Metzner, 1845)
- Aplocera corsalta (Schawerda, 1928)
- Aplocera cretica (Reisser, 1974)
- Aplocera dervenaria Mentzer, 1981
- Aplocera dzungarica Vasilenko, 1995
- Aplocera efformata – lesser treble-bar (Guénée, 1858)
  - Aplocera efformata britonata Leraut, 1995
  - Aplocera efformata efformata (Guénée, 1858)
- Aplocera hissara Vasilenko, 1995
- Aplocera mundulata (Guenée, [1858])
- Aplocera musculata (Staudinger, 1892)
- Aplocera numidaria (Herrich-Schäffer, 1856)
- Aplocera obsitaria (Lederer, 1853)
- Aplocera opificata (Lederer, 1870)
- Aplocera perelegans (Warren, 1894)
- Aplocera plagiata – treble-bar (Linnaeus, 1758)
  - Aplocera plagiata hausmanni Expòsito Hermosa, 1998
  - Aplocera plagiata plagiata (Linnaeus, 1758)
- Aplocera praeformata – purple treble-bar (Hübner, 1826)
  - Aplocera praeformata gibeauxi Leraut, 1995
  - Aplocera praeformata praeformata (Hübner, 1826)
  - Aplocera praeformata urbahni Dufay, 1981
- Aplocera roddi Vasilenko, 1995
- Aplocera simpliciata (Treitschke, 1835)
  - Aplocera simpliciata balcanica (Züllich, 1936)
  - Aplocera simpliciata graeciata (Staudinger, 1901)
  - Aplocera simpliciata pierretaria (Guillemot, 1856)
  - Aplocera simpliciata simpliciata (Treitschke, 1835)
- Aplocera uniformata (Urbahn, 1971)
- Aplocera vivesi Expòsito Hermosa, 1998
