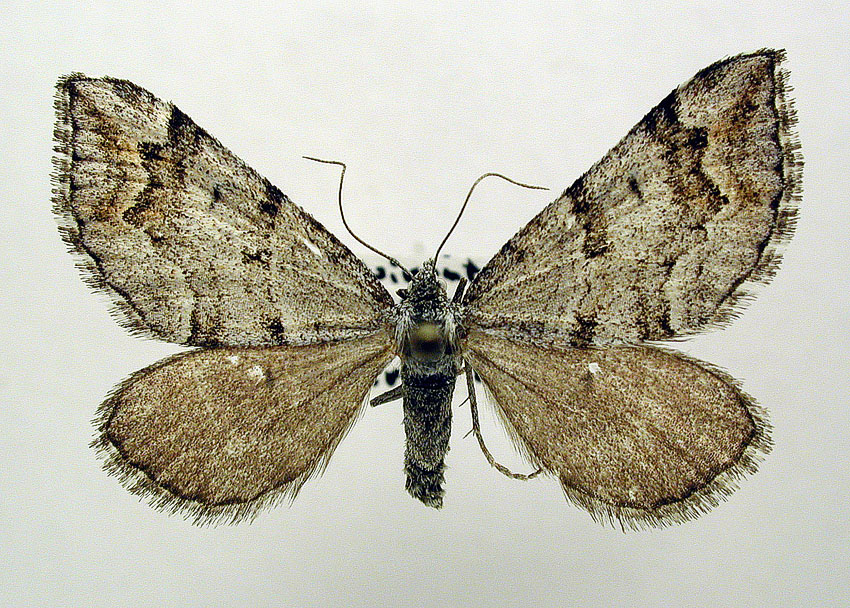

Scientific classification
- Kingdom: Animalia
- Phylum: Arthropoda
- Class: Insecta
- Order: Lepidoptera
- Family: Geometridae
- Genus: Carsia
- Species: C. sororiata

Binomial name
- Carsia sororiata (Hübner, 1813)

Synonyms
- Geometra sororiata Hubner, 1813; Phalaena paludata Thunberg, 1788 (preocc. Linnaeus, 1767); Geometra imbutata Hubner, 1813; Larissa imbutata (Hübner, 1809-13); Carsia boreata Packard, 1873; Carsia anglica Prout, 1937

= Carsia sororiata =

Species of moth

Carsia sororiata, the Manchester treble-bar, is a moth of the family Geometridae. The species was first described by Jacob Hübner in 1813. It is found in northern and central Europe, the Urals, Siberia, the Far East, northern Mongolia and in North America from Alaska to Newfoundland and to New Hampshire.

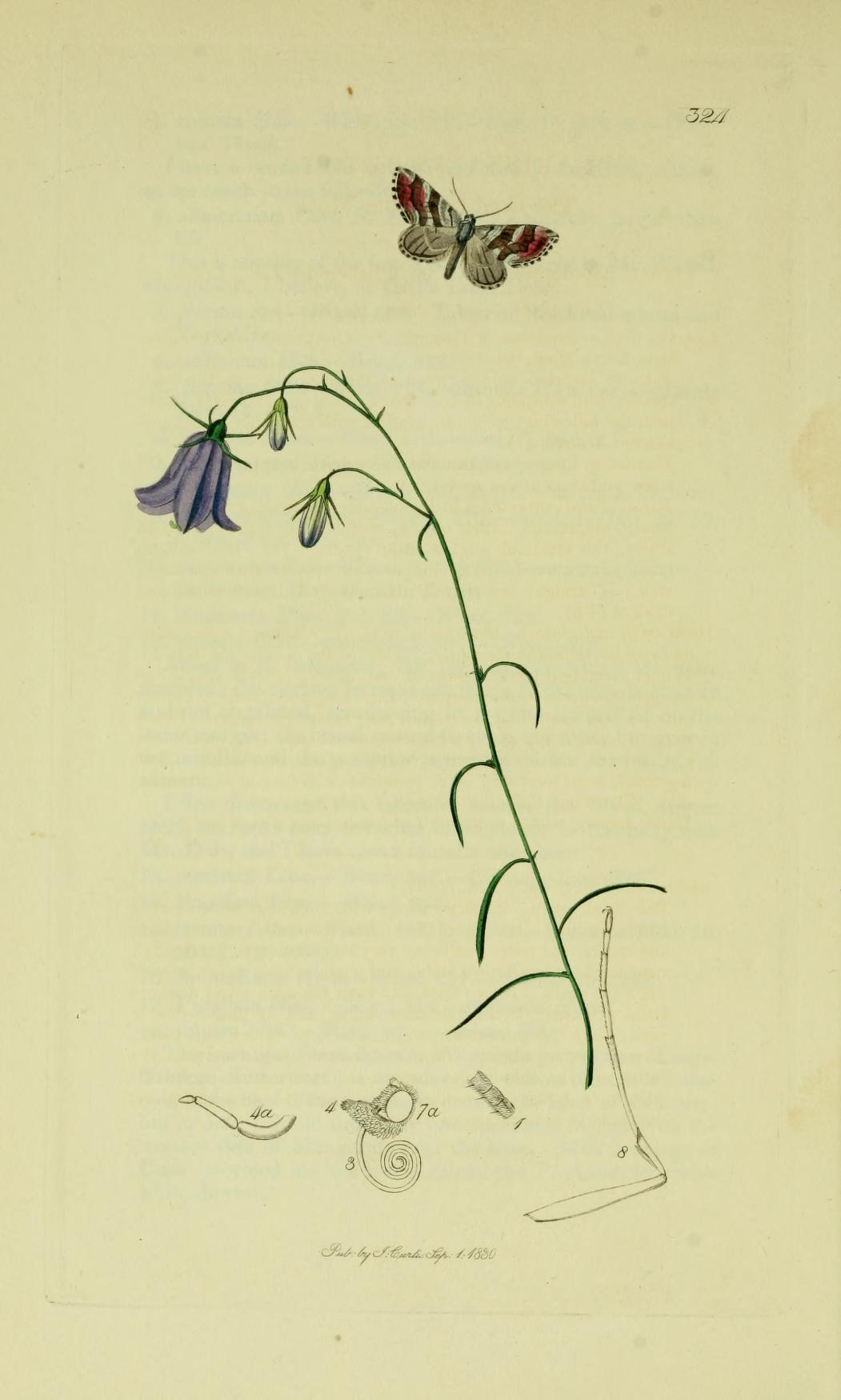
Illustration from John Curtis's British Entomology Volume 6

The wingspan is 20–30 mm. The basic colour of the forewings is slate grey, light grey to white grey. Two distinctive, wide lines cross the front wing. They are light brown, brown to black brown. The interior cross line is almost straight, the exterior cross line is bent and has two outward pointing spikes. The subspecies occurring in Central Europe, C. s. imbutata, has a brownish-yellowish to reddish-brown outer field at the points of the outer cross line. Very elegant lines are sometimes found. In some specimens, the two lines form "bridge" in the posterior half of the wing. The fringes are alternately bright and dark. An apical extension to the reddish-brown field extends from the apex. The egg is at first whitish yellow, becoming deeper yellow. The micropylar rosette is 8-leaved; sides with irregular reticulation, in places undeveloped. The larva is rather stout, of uniform thickness, the dorsal surface rather deep brownish-red, with very fine blackish-red dorsal and subdorsal lines and a broad bright yellow lateral stripe containing at the folds between the middle segments some beautiful red spots; venter pale greenish yellow with paler, dark-edged central line.

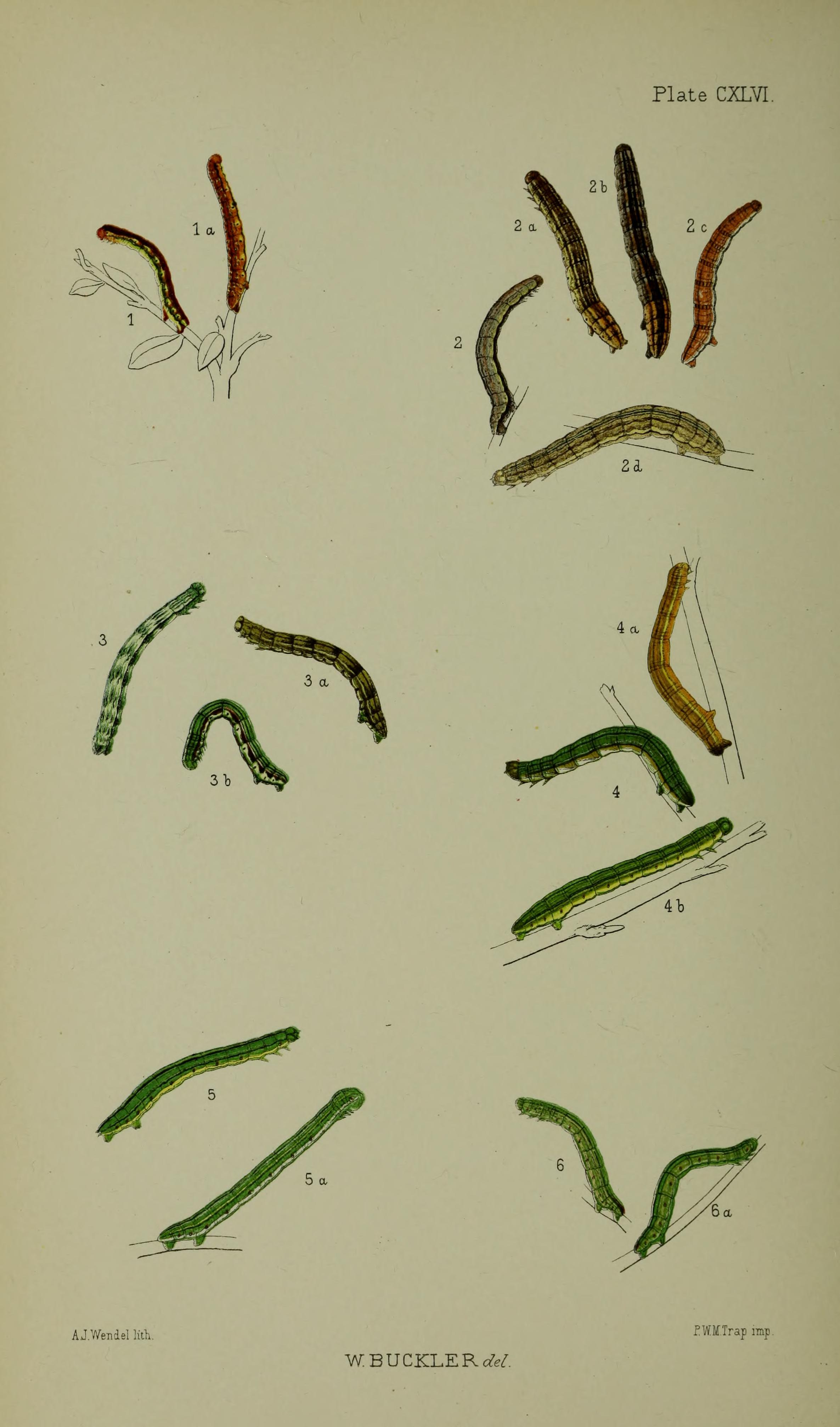
Figs.Figs 1, 1a larvae after final moult

Adults are on wing from July to August.

The larvae feed on various Vaccinium species (including V. uliginosum, V. oxycoccos and V. myrtillus) as well as Rubus arcticus.

== Subspecies ==
- Carsia sororiata sororiata Northern Europe
- Carsia sororiata alpinata Packard, 1873 North America
- Carsia sororiata labradoriensis (Sommer, 1897) Labrador -poorly marked, but is narrow-winged, more brownish grey or tinged with reddish.
- Carsia sororiata thaxteri Swett, 1917 Newfoundland
- Carsia sororiata columbia McDunnough, 1939 North America
- Carsia sororiata anglica Prout, 1937 British Isles
- Carsia sororiata imbutata (Hubner, 1813) Central Europe - much more variegated. Ground-colour more whitish, with sub-basal line and two bands in the median area distinct, brown, distal area from about the 5th subcostal to the 1st median more or less strongly suffused with red-brown. Under surface lighter and more strongly reddish.
