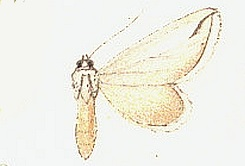

Scientific classification
- Domain: Eukaryota
- Kingdom: Animalia
- Phylum: Arthropoda
- Class: Insecta
- Order: Lepidoptera
- Family: Geometridae
- Genus: Lithostege
- Species: L. fissurata

Binomial name
- Lithostege fissurata Mabille, [1888]

Synonyms
- Lithostege inanis Prout in Seitz, 1941; Lithostege fitzgeraldi Wiltshire, 1947

= Lithostege fissurata =

Species of moth

Lithostege fissurata is a moth of the family Geometridae. It was described by Jules Paul Mabille in 1888. It is found from western Algeria to Libya, south-eastern Egypt and Israel and from Saudi Arabia to south-eastern Iran and southern Iraq. It is also found on Malta.

The wingspan is 19–28 mm. Adults are on wing from early March to early May and from mid-February to mid-March.

== Subspecies ==
- Lithostege fissurata fissurata
- Lithostege fissurata inanis Prout in Seitz, 1941 (Saudi Arabia to south-eastern Iran and southern Iraq)
