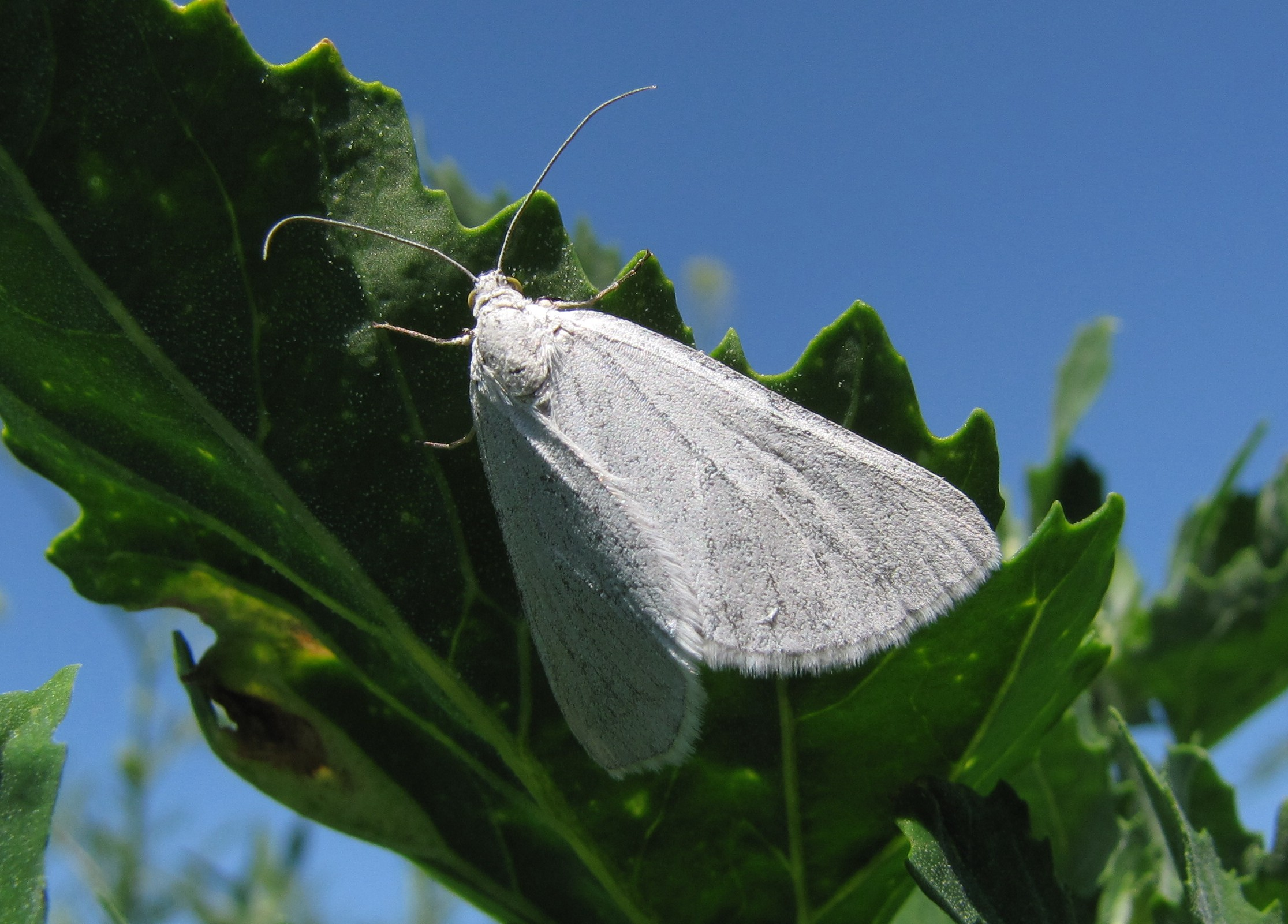

Scientific classification
- Domain: Eukaryota
- Kingdom: Animalia
- Phylum: Arthropoda
- Class: Insecta
- Order: Lepidoptera
- Family: Geometridae
- Genus: Lithostege
- Species: L. farinata

Binomial name
- Lithostege farinata (Hufnagel, 1767)

Synonyms
- Phalaena farinata Hufnagel, 1767; Lithostege bachmutensis Prout, 1937

= Lithostege farinata =

Species of moth

Lithostege farinata is a moth of the family Geometridae. It is found from the Iberian Peninsula through north-eastern Germany east to eastern Europe and the Caucasus to western Siberia and Central Asia (Altai and Tian Shan). In the north, it ranges to southern Scandinavia and the Baltic States. In the south, it is found up to southern Italy and the Balkan Peninsula. It has also been recorded from south-eastern Turkey and north-western Africa. There are old records from Israel and Egypt.

The wingspan is 29–33 mm. There is generally one generation per year with adults on wing from the end of May to the beginning of July.

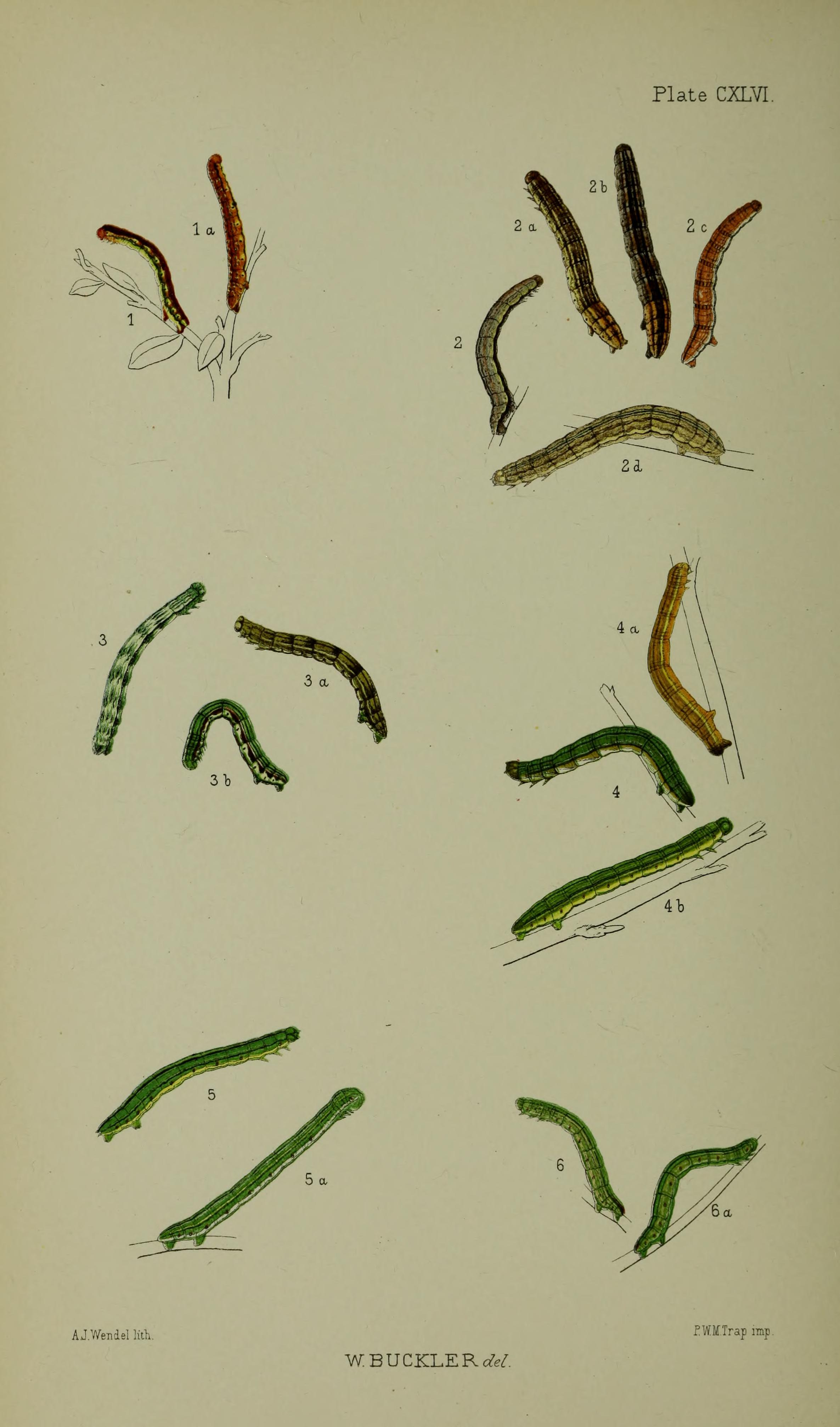
Figs.3, 3a, 3b larvae in various stages

The larvae feed on Sisymbrium officinale, Descurainia sophia, Berteroa incana, Sinapis arvensis, Alliaria petiolata and Raphanus raphanistrum.

== Subspecies ==
- Lithostege farinata farinata
- Lithostege farinata bachmutica Prout, 1938 (western Siberia)
