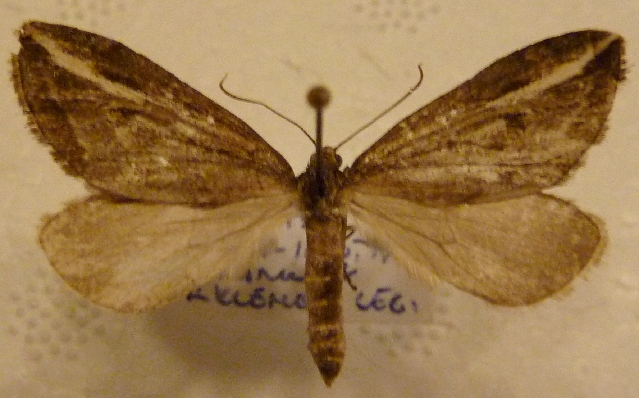

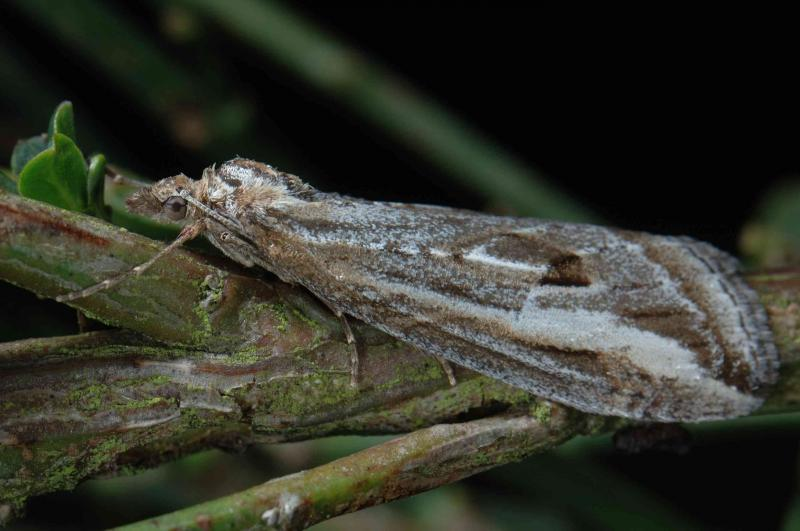

Scientific classification
- Domain: Eukaryota
- Kingdom: Animalia
- Phylum: Arthropoda
- Class: Insecta
- Order: Lepidoptera
- Family: Geometridae
- Genus: Chesias
- Species: C. legatella

Binomial name
- Chesias legatella (Denis & Schiffermüller, 1775)

= Streak (moth) =

Species of moth

The streak (Chesias legatella) is a moth of the family Geometridae. It is found in northern and western Europe and north Africa. It is common in Britain, but local and confined to the north in Ireland. The species was first described by Michael Denis and Ignaz Schiffermüller in 1775.

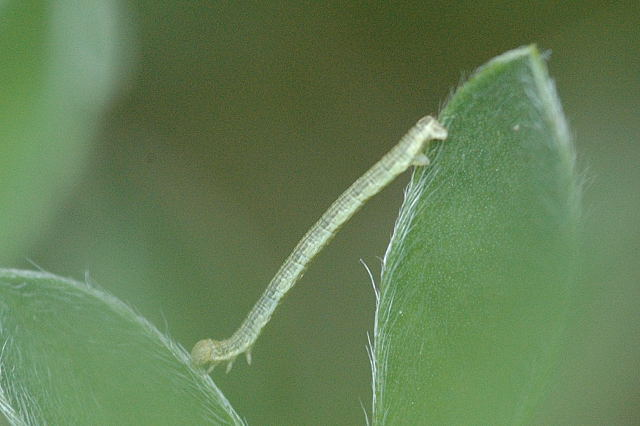
Chesias legatella caterpillar

The species is quite variable, the forewings being buff or brown, but is always easily identified by the bold whitish apical streak which gives it its common name. The hindwings are pale grey or buff. The wingspan is 35–38 millimetres (1.4–1.5 in). See Prout for a full description. The larva is usually dark green with darker, paler-edged dorsal line, a broad whitish or yellowish subdorsal. It has a conspicuous white lateral stripe and 3 white lines ventrally. The spiracles are red, ringed with black. It is adaptive to its environment, a yellow form being frequent on plants on which there is much bloom, while a much blackened form has been recorded from dry, stunted plants. The pupa is red-brown, dorsally rather darker, wings tinged with green.

The moth flies, usually at dusk, in September and October and is sometimes attracted to light.

The larva usually feeds on broom but has been recorded on yellow bush lupin. The species overwinters as an egg. The pupa is buried deeply in the ground without a cocoon.

1. The flight season refers to the British Isles. This may vary in other parts of the range.
