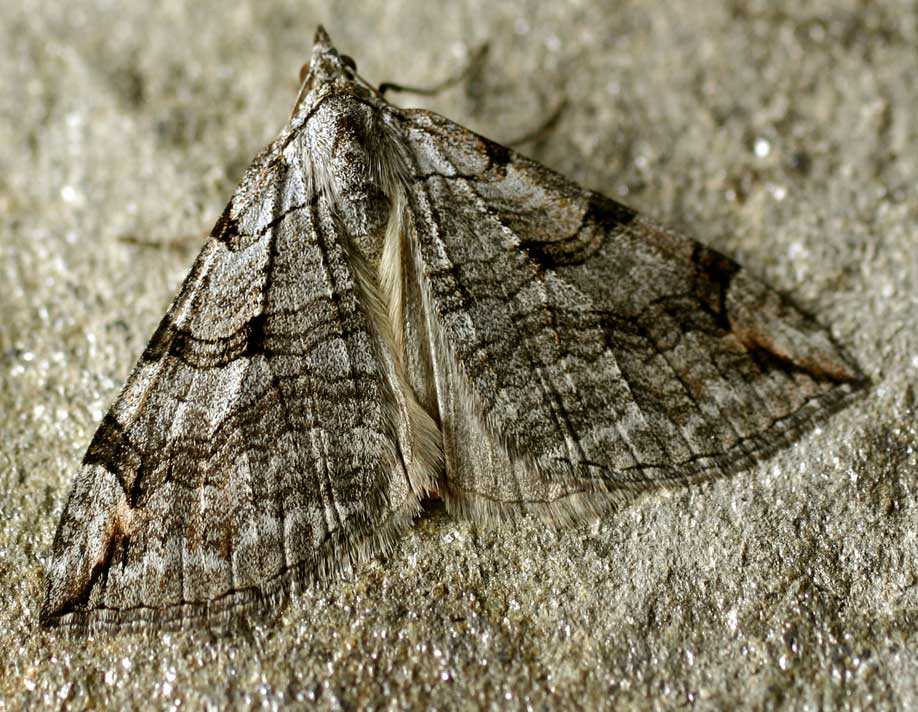

Scientific classification
- Kingdom: Animalia
- Phylum: Arthropoda
- Clade: Pancrustacea
- Class: Insecta
- Order: Lepidoptera
- Family: Geometridae
- Genus: Aplocera
- Species: A. plagiata

Binomial name
- Aplocera plagiata (Linnaeus, 1758)

= Treble-bar =

Species of moth

Aplocera plagiata, known as the treble-bar or St. John's wort inchworm, is a moth of the family Geometridae. The species was first described by Carl Linnaeus in his 1758 10th edition of Systema Naturae. It is found throughout the Palearctic region and the Near East.

This species varies considerably in size (wingspan 37–43 mm) and colouration, but is generally grey with three characteristic dark fascia across each forewing, that resemble a musical 'Staff', giving it its common name. The hindwings are pale grey or buff. Many forma have been described. (See Prout's The Macrolepidoptera of the world) Aplocera plagiata is difficult to certainly distinguish from its congener Aplocera efformata (See Townsend et al.)

One or two broods are produced each year. In the British Isles, the adults can be seen at any time from May to September. The species flies at night and is attracted to light. The egg is whitish, without gloss, micropylar rosette 11- to 12-leaved, the sides with regular polygonal reticulation, each cell again more irregularly subdivided. The larva is also very variable, being green to reddish brown with alternating darker and lighter stripes. It feeds on various species of St John's wort (Hypericum species). It overwinters as a small larva.

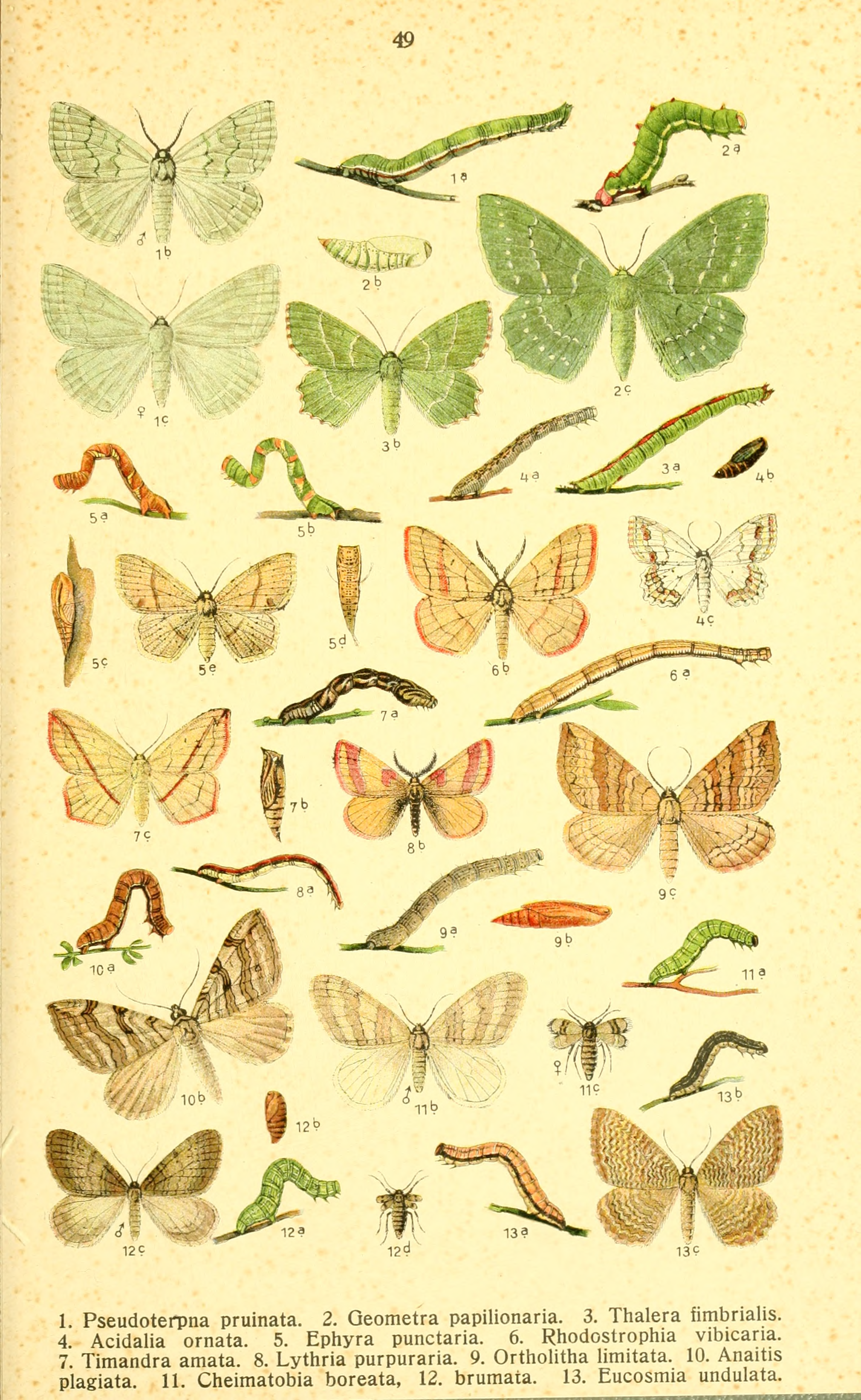
Moth and larrva depicted in Die Schmetterlinge Deutschlands 10,10a

== Subspecies ==
- Aplocera plagiata hausmanni
- Aplocera plagiata plagiata
