= Karl Schawerda =

Austrian entomologist and gynecologist

Karl Schawerda (also Carl Schawerda; 4 February 1869 – 11 September 1945) was an Austrian entomologist who specialised in Lepidoptera. He devoted to researching moths, but also has significant as an author describing some of the new forms of Parnassius apollo Linnaeus, 1758.

== Life ==
Schawerda was born in Újezd, Moravia, Austria-Hungary. His father was a railway engineer. After primary and secondary education he studied medicine at the University of Vienna, After graduation in 1894 a gynecologist for four years at the Krankenhaus St. Anna Kinderhospital in Vienna. Later he worked as a gynecologist and obstetrician in Vienna. In his practice he achieved the rank of "Obermedizinalrat" – "chief medical advisor. He described several new species of moths. His collection of 50,000 specimens is mostly stored in Naturhistorisches Museum in Vienna. A smaller portion of his collection, mainly Palaearctic species of Microlepidoptera Übersee Museum Bremen in Bremen.

He died on 11 September 1945 in Vienna.

== Selected works ==
- Schawerda, K.: 1908, Bericht über lepidopterologische Sammelreisen in Bosnien und in der Hercegovina. Jahr. des Wiener Ent. Ver. Jahrg. XIX: 85–126.
- Schawerda, K.: 1910, Zwei Arctiidenformen aus Bosnien und der Hrzegowina. Verhandlungen der kaiserlich – königlichen zoologisch – botanischen Gesellschaft in Wien, 60, 90–93.
