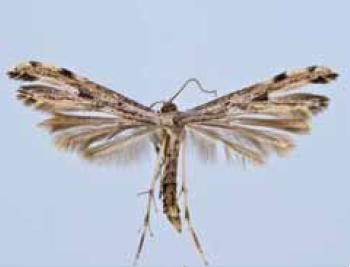

Scientific classification
- Kingdom: Animalia
- Phylum: Arthropoda
- Class: Insecta
- Order: Lepidoptera
- Family: Pterophoridae
- Genus: Adaina
- Species: A. ambrosiae

Binomial name
- Adaina ambrosiae (Murtfeldt, 1880)

Synonyms
- Pterophorus ambrosiae Murtfeldt, 1880; Pterophorus participatus Möschler, 1890; Adaina sanctaecrucis B. Landry & Gielis (nomen nudum)

= Adaina ambrosiae =

Species of plume moth

Adaina ambrosiae (ambrosia plume moth or ragweed plume moth) is a moth of the family Pterophoridae. It is found in North America from California east to Florida and north to Ontario. It is also known from Bermuda, Costa Rica, Jamaica, Puerto Rico and the Virgin Islands.

The wingspan is 13–17 millimetres (0.51–0.67 in). Adults are on wing nearly year-round in the southern part of their range.

The larvae feed on Ambrosia artemissiifolia, Ambrosia acanthicarpa, Ambrosia chamissonis, Ambrosia confertiflora, Ambrosia dumosa, Ambrosia eriocentra, Ambrosia cumanensis, Pluchea rosea, Melanthera nivea, Helianthus annuus, Helianthus tuberosa, Xanthium strumarium and Cynara scolymus.

== Etymology ==
The specific name refers to one of the host plants, Ambrosia.
