= Silverleaf =

Silver leaf or Silverleaf may refer to:

== Animals ==
- Bemisia tabaci, the silverleaf whitefly
- Trachypithecus cristatus, the silvered leaf monkey

== Places ==
=== Australia ===
- Silverleaf, Queensland, a locality in South Burnett Region, Queensland

=== United States ===
- Silverleaf, North Dakota, United States
- Silver Leaf Township, Becker County, Minnesota, United States

== Plants ==
=== Common name "Silverleaf" ===
- Argophyllum nullumense, Australian shrub
- Callicoma serratifolia, Australian tree, also known as the black wattle
- Leucadendron argenteum, South African tree
- Leucophyllum frutescens, North American shrub, also known as the Texas sage
- Terminalia sericea, South African tree
- A fictional herb in the game Warcraft

=== Common name containing "Silverleaf" ===
- Acer saccharinum, the silverleaf maple
- Ambrosia tomentosa, the silverleaf povertyweed
- Arctostaphylos silvicola, the silverleaf manzanita
- Astragalus falcatus, the silverleaf milkvetch
- Cercocarpus montanus, the silverleaf mountain mahogany
- Cotoneaster pannosus, the silverleaf cotoneaster
- Dichondra sericea, the silverleaf ponysfoot
- Englerophytum natalense, the silver-leaf milkplum
- Hydrangea radiata, the silverleaf hydrangea
- Pediomelum argophyllum, the silverleaf Indian breadroot
- Phacelia hastata, the silverleaf scorpionweed
- Pleurophyllum hookeri, the silverleaf daisy
- Populus alba, the silverleaf poplar
- Quercus hypoleucoides, the silverleaf oak
- Solanum elaeagnifolium, the silverleaf nightshade

=== Diseases ===
- Silver leaf (disease) (caused by Chondrostereum purpureum), a fungal disease of trees, including:
  - Silver leaf of almond

== Other ==
- Silver leaf (art), elemental silver leaf used to decorate objects
- Silver leaf (food), elemental silver leaf used to decorate food
- Silverleaf, pen name of Jessie Lloyd, Australian writer
- USS Silverleaf (AN-68), an Ailanthus-class net laying ship
