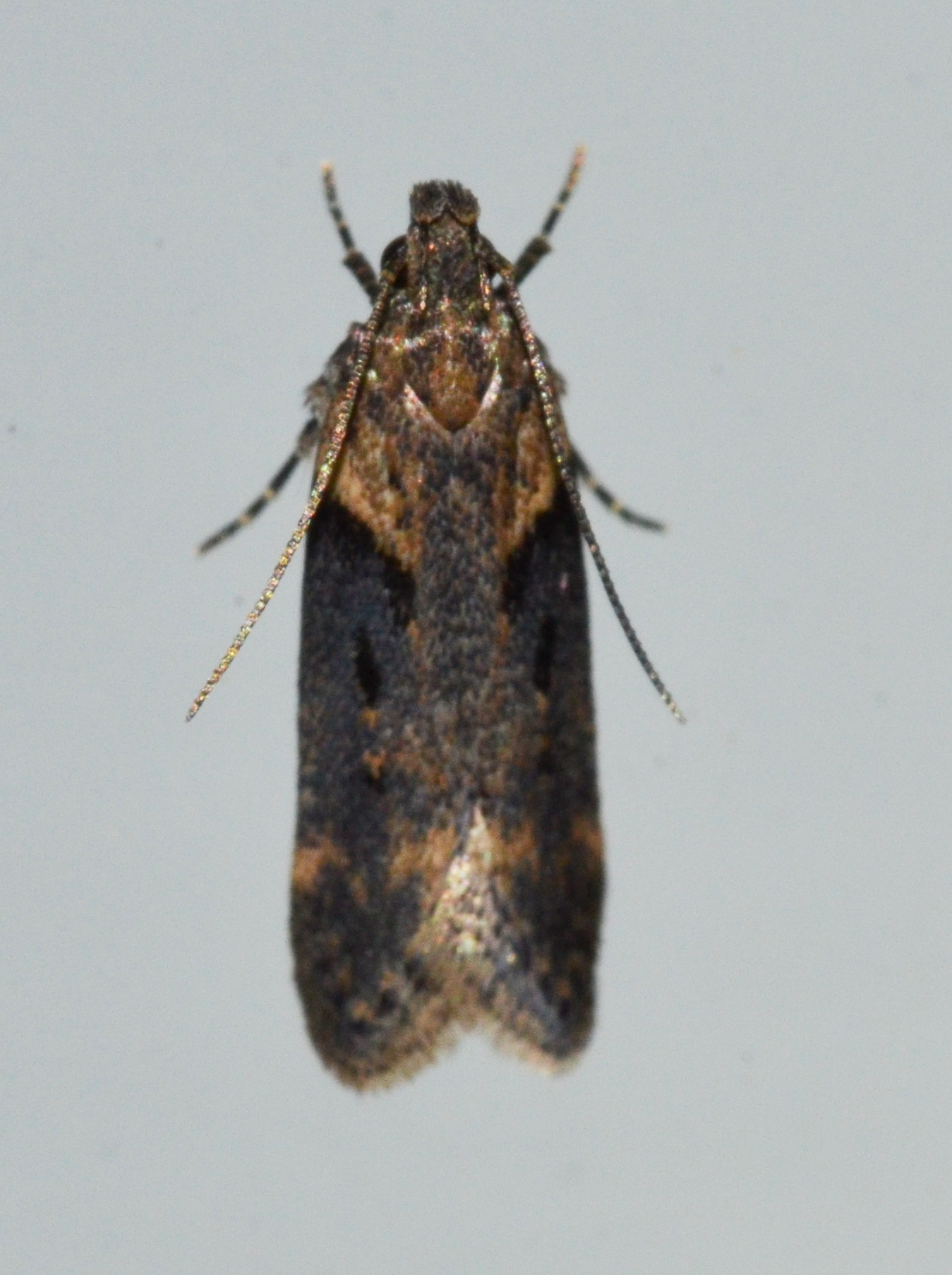

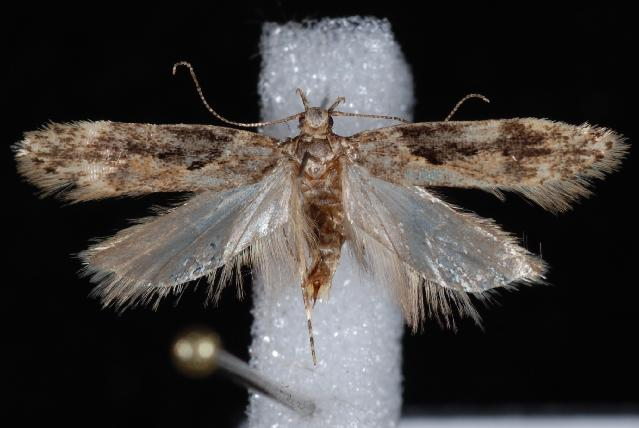

Scientific classification
- Kingdom: Animalia
- Phylum: Arthropoda
- Clade: Pancrustacea
- Class: Insecta
- Order: Lepidoptera
- Family: Gelechiidae
- Genus: Chionodes
- Species: C. mediofuscella

Binomial name
- Chionodes mediofuscella (Clemens, 1863)

Synonyms
- Gelechia mediofuscella Clemens, 1863; Gelechia vagella Walker, 1864; Depressaria fuscoochrella Chambers, 1872; Gelechia (Lita) liturosella Zeller, 1873; Gelechia rhedaria Meyrick, 1923

= Chionodes mediofuscella =

Black-smudged chionodes moth

Species of moth

Chionodes mediofuscella, the black-smudged chionodes moth, is a moth of the family Gelechiidae. It is found in North America, where it has been recorded from Nova Scotia to Florida and from British Columbia to Colorado, Arizona and northern California.

The forewings are pale yellowish with a dark brown spot along the costa. There is a blackish-brown dot at the angle on the fold and another above it. The hindwings are shining pale grey.

The larvae feed on Ambrosia trifida.
