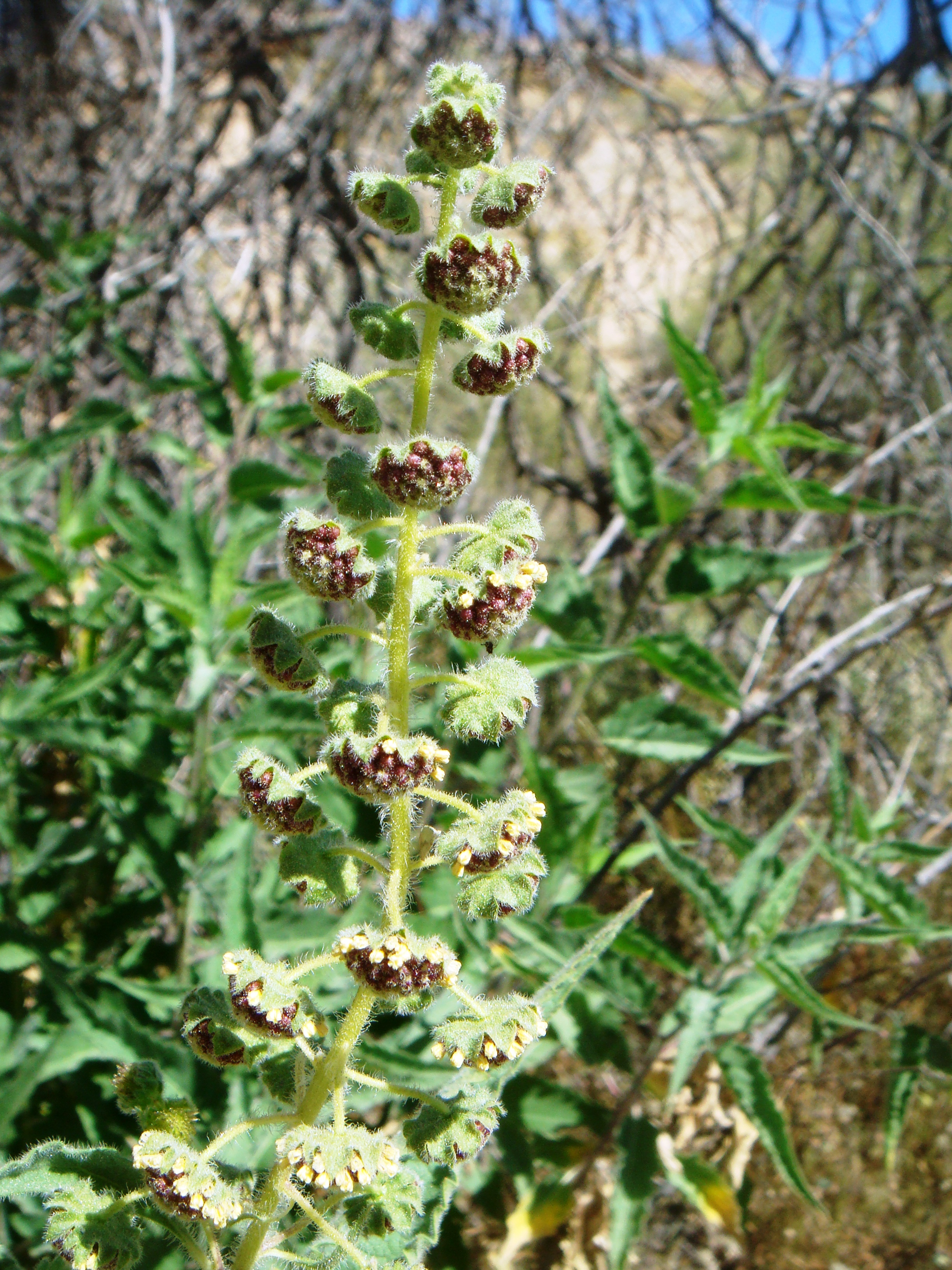
- South Mountain, Phoenix, Arizona

Scientific classification
- Kingdom: Plantae
- Clade: Tracheophytes
- Clade: Angiosperms
- Clade: Eudicots
- Clade: Asterids
- Order: Asterales
- Family: Asteraceae
- Tribe: Heliantheae
- Genus: Ambrosia
- Species: A. ambrosioides

Binomial name
- Ambrosia ambrosioides (Cav.) W.W.Payne

Synonyms
- Ambrosia longifolia Sessé & Moc.; Franseria ambrosioides Cav.; Gaertneria ambrosiodes (Cav.) Kuntze; Xanthidium ambrosioides (Cav.) Delpino

= Ambrosia ambrosioides =

Species of flowering plant

Ambrosia ambrosioides, also known as canyon ragweed or chicura, is a ragweed found in the deserts of northern Mexico (Baja California, Baja California Sur, Chihuahua, Durango, Sonora), Arizona, and California (Ventura + San Diego Counties).

Growing as a shrub from 1–2 meters high, its elongate, coarsely-toothed leaves range from 4–18 cm long and 1.5–4 cm wide. It is monoecious, with both terminal and axillary racemes consisting of staminate heads occurring above their pistillate counterparts. Flowering occurs mainly in February through April. The fruits are 10–15 mm burs covered with hooked spines.

Somewhat similar in appearance to Ambrosia ilicifolia, A. ilicifolia has sessile leaves with a reticulate pattern of veins, and the marginal teeth developed into short spines.

This ragweed can be found in sandy washes and other disturbed areas such as roadsides, and is sometimes seen growing in rock crevices.

The Seri people smoked its dried leaves, and used the roots to make medicinal teas and pigments.

== Galls ==
This species is host to the following insect induced galls:

- Aceria ambrosioides Irregular leaf galls (see image)
- Aceria caborcensis Irregular leaf galls

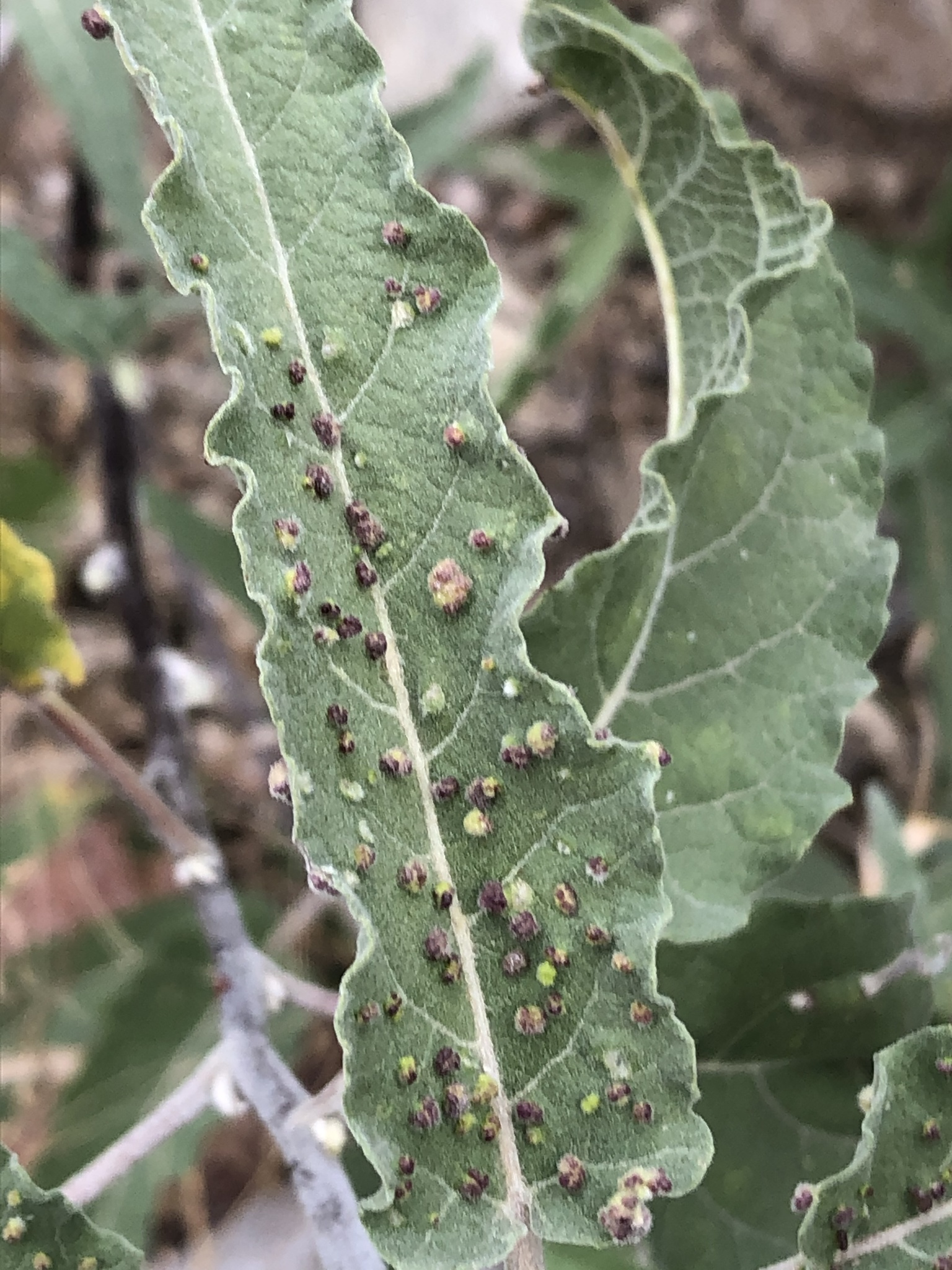
Aceria ambrosioides galls

external link to gallformers
