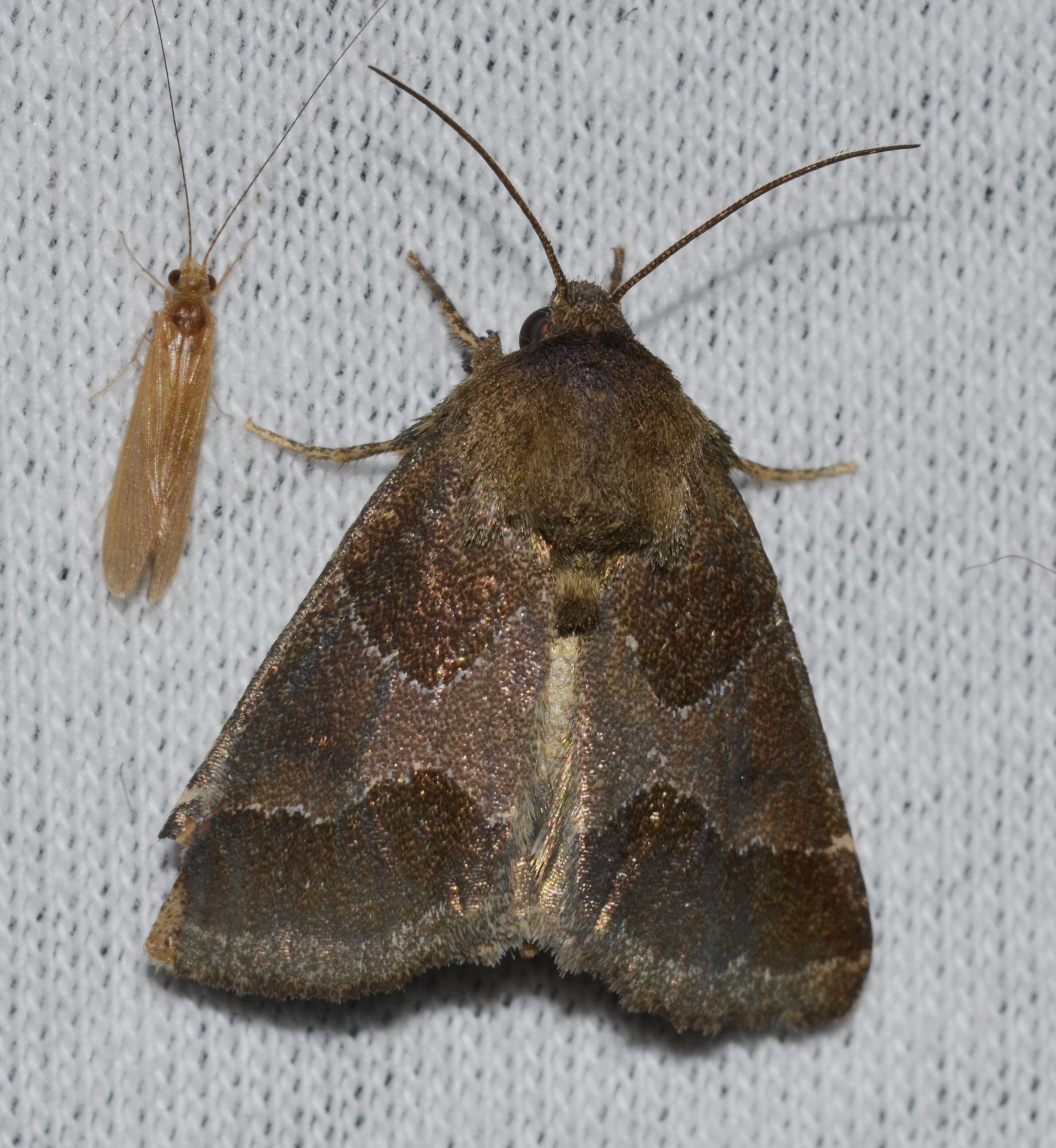

Scientific classification
- Kingdom: Animalia
- Phylum: Arthropoda
- Class: Insecta
- Order: Lepidoptera
- Superfamily: Noctuoidea
- Family: Noctuidae
- Genus: Schinia
- Species: S. thoreaui

Binomial name
- Schinia thoreaui Grote & Robinson, 1870

= Schinia thoreaui =

Species of moth

Thoreau's flower moth (Schinia thoreaui) is a moth of the family Noctuidae. It is found in North America, including Maryland, Illinois, Kansas, Oklahoma, Arizona, Ontario and Saskatchewan.

The wingspan is about 32 mm. Adults are on wing from June to August.

The larvae feed on Ambrosia species.
