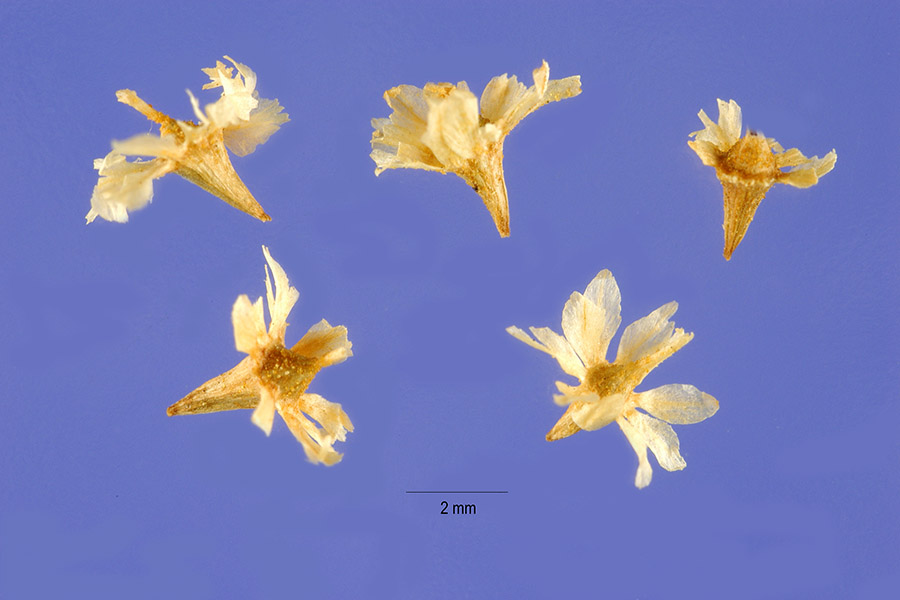
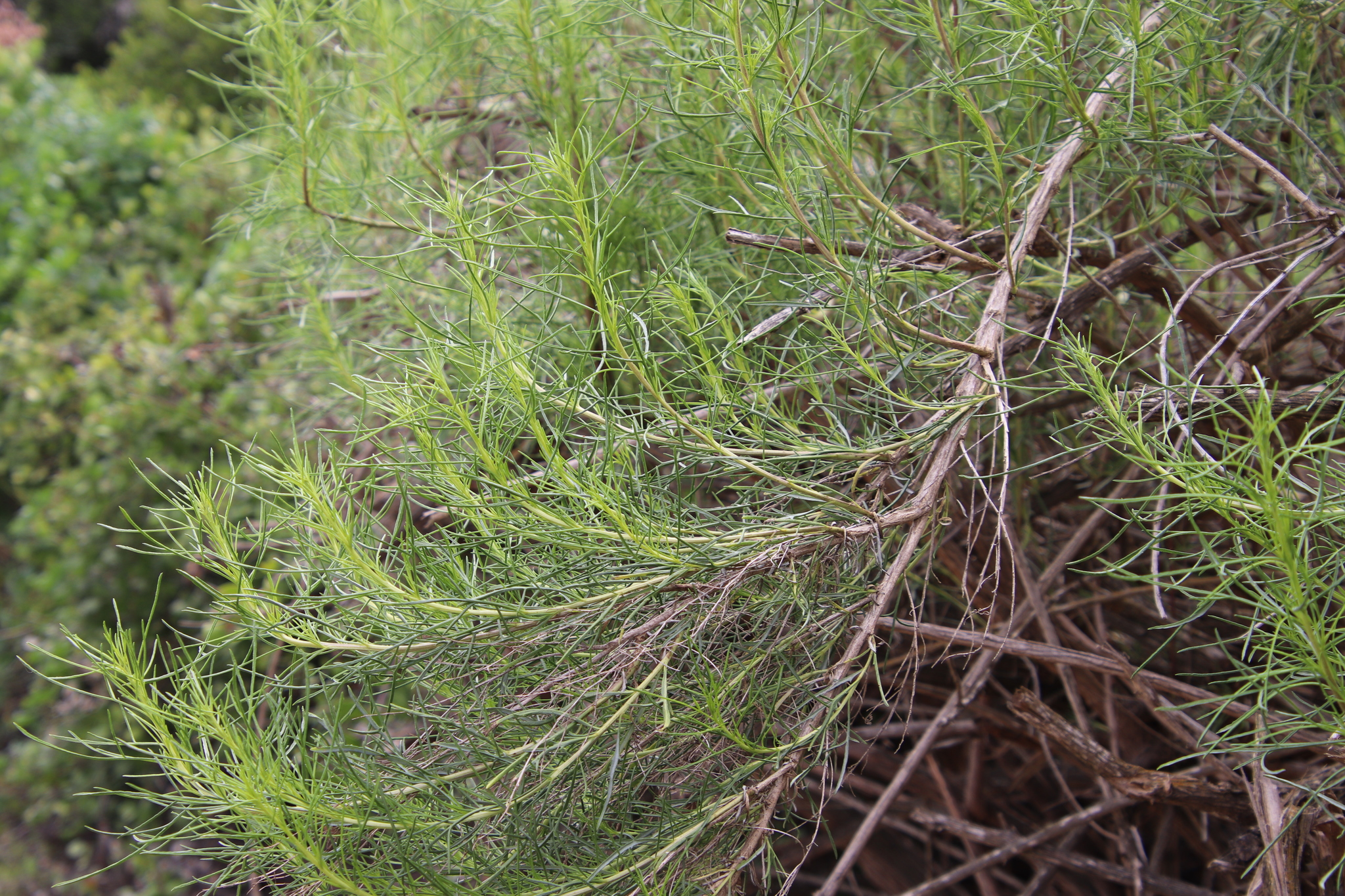
- Winged fruits (top) and leaves and branches (bottom)

Scientific classification
- Kingdom: Plantae
- Clade: Tracheophytes
- Clade: Angiosperms
- Clade: Eudicots
- Clade: Asterids
- Order: Asterales
- Family: Asteraceae
- Genus: Ambrosia
- Species: A. monogyra

Binomial name
- Ambrosia monogyra (Torr. & A. Gray) Strother & B.G. Baldwin

Synonyms
- Hymenoclea monogyra Torr. & A.Gray ex A.Gray

= Ambrosia monogyra =

Species of flowering plant

Ambrosia monogyra is a species of flowering plant in the sunflower family commonly known as the singlewhorl burrobrush, leafy burrobush, slender burrobush, and desert fragrance. Ambrosia monogyra is native to North America and is typically found in canyons, desert washes, and ravines throughout arid parts of the southwestern United States and northern Mexico. This species has green, threadlike leaves that emit a distinctive odor when crushed, and flowers from August to November. The fruits have distinctive wings in their middle that aid in dispersion through wind and water.

== Description ==
Amsrosia monogyra is a shrub 1–4 m (3.3–13.1 ft) tall. The leaves are very thin and thread-like, alternately arranged, and sometimes divided into thread-like lobes. The staminate flowers have translucent white corollas and the pistillate flowers are rounded, fruit-bearing structures. The fruit is an achene with a single whorl of several papery wings.

== Distribution and habitat ==
The plant is native to the southwestern United States, including the states of California, Arizona, New Mexico, Texas, and northern Mexico, where it is found in Baja California, Baja California Sur, Chihuahua, Sinaloa, Sonora.

Habitats it is found in include California chaparral and woodlands in the Peninsular Ranges of Southern California and northern Baja California. The plant also grows in washes and ravines in desert areas.
