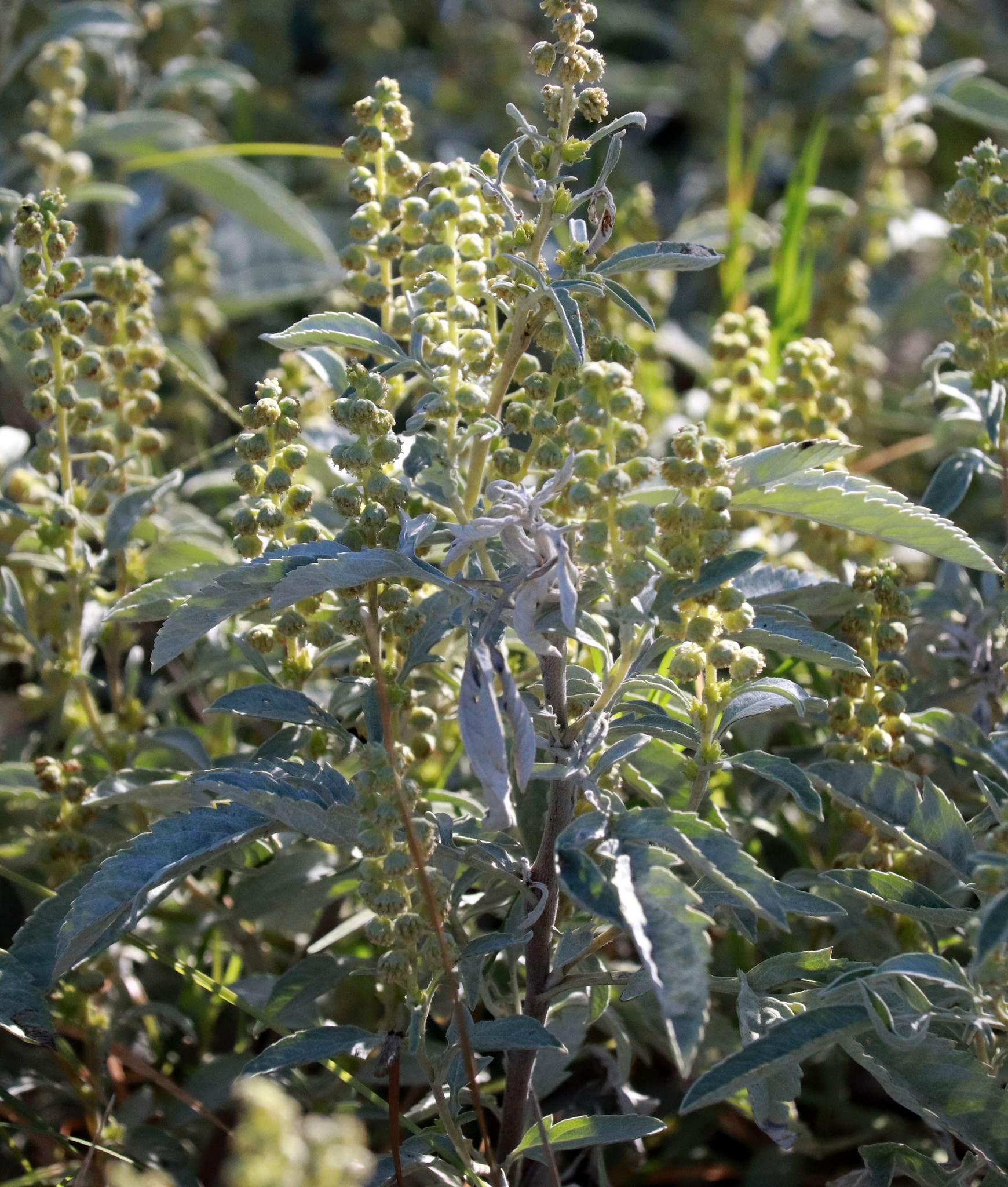

Conservation status
- Secure (NatureServe)

Scientific classification
- Kingdom: Plantae
- Clade: Tracheophytes
- Clade: Angiosperms
- Clade: Eudicots
- Clade: Asterids
- Order: Asterales
- Family: Asteraceae
- Genus: Ambrosia
- Species: A. grayi

Binomial name
- Ambrosia grayi (A.Nelson) Shinners

Synonyms
- Franseria grayi A.Nelson; Franseria tomentosa A.Gray 1849, not Ambrosia tomentosa Nutt. 1818; Gaertneria grayi A.Nelson; Gaertneria tomentosa (A.Gray) Kuntze

= Ambrosia grayi =

Species of flowering plant

Ambrosia grayi, the woollyleaf bur ragweed, is a North American species of plants in the family Asteraceae. It is native to the west-central part of the Great Plains of the United States, in the states of Nebraska, Kansas, Colorado, New Mexico, Oklahoma, and Texas.

Ambrosia grayi is a perennial herb up to 30 cm (12 inches) tall. Leaves are elliptical or egg-shaped. Flower heads are small and inconspicuous, as the plant is wind-pollinated. The heads develop into spiny burs as the seeds ripen.
