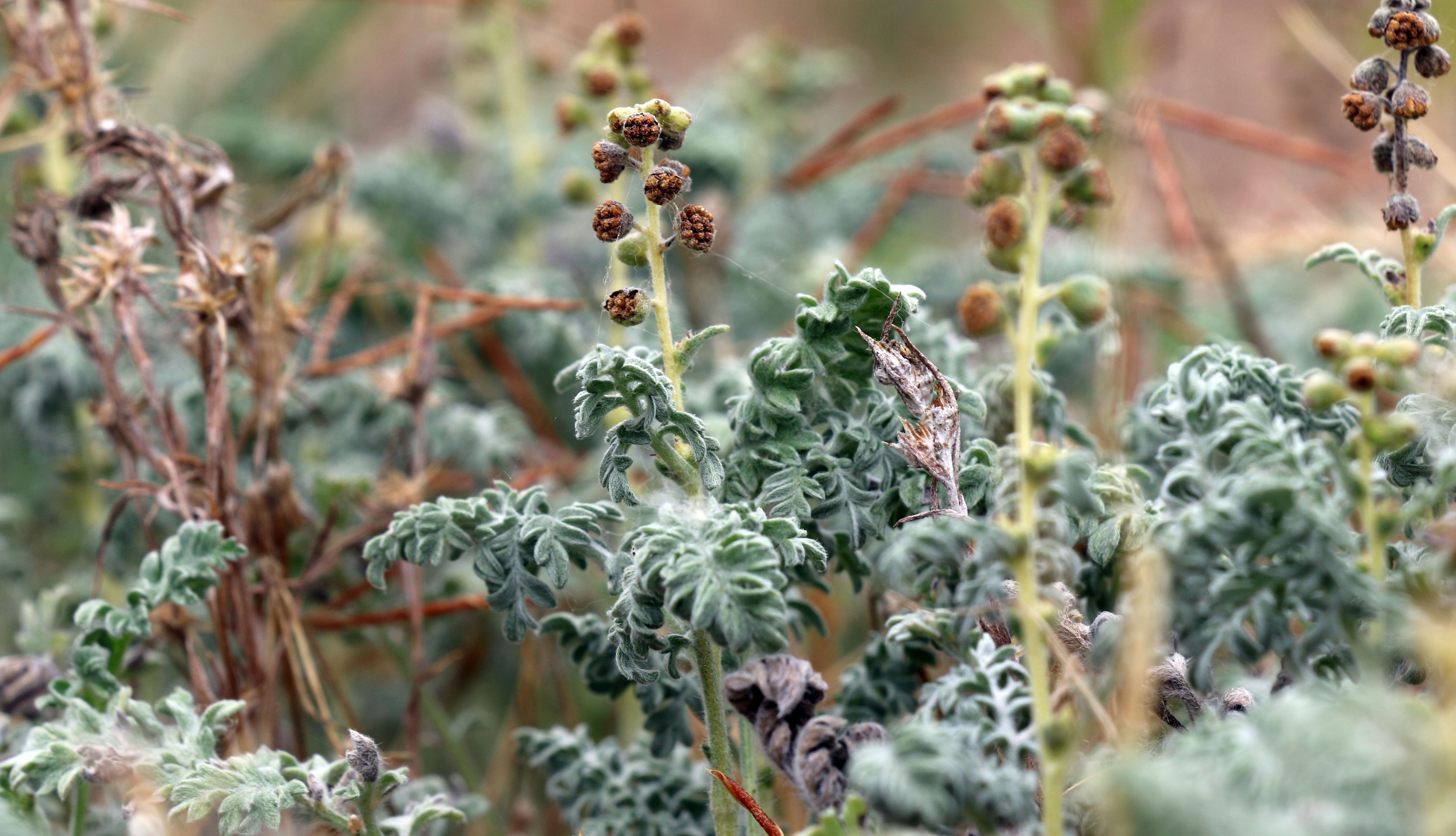

Conservation status
- Critically Imperiled (NatureServe)

Scientific classification
- Kingdom: Plantae
- Clade: Tracheophytes
- Clade: Angiosperms
- Clade: Eudicots
- Clade: Asterids
- Order: Asterales
- Family: Asteraceae
- Tribe: Heliantheae
- Genus: Ambrosia
- Species: A. pumila

Binomial name
- Ambrosia pumila (Nutt.) A.Gray

Synonyms
- Franseria pumila Nutt.

= Ambrosia pumila =

Species of flowering plant

Ambrosia pumila is a rare species of herbaceous perennial plant known by the common names San Diego ragweed and San Diego ambrosia. It is native to far southern California, Baja California, and Baja California Sur. It grows in floodplains and open grasslands in proximity to wetland areas.

== Distribution and habitat ==
It is adapted to dry habitat, but only on upper floodplain fringes, or adjoining depressions containing vernal pools or similar structures. It is a plant of open habitat and is not tolerant of heavy shade.

Today it is known from 19 populations. Fourteen of them are in San Diego County, two exist in Riverside County, and there are three south of the border in Baja California and Baja California Sur in Mexico. Most of its native habitat has been consumed by urbanization and development. It is also threatened by agriculture. This is a federally listed endangered species of the United States.

== Description ==
Ambrosia pumila is a hairy perennial herb not exceeding 0.5 metres (1.6 ft) in height. The leaves are gray-green and fuzzy and divided into several subdivided segments. They are up to 13 centimeters long, not counting the winged petioles.

The inflorescence is tipped with staminate (male) flower heads above several larger pistillate (female) heads. The pistillate heads each yield usually one fruit, which is a fuzzy burr only a few millimeters wide with short, soft spines. The plant rarely produces seeds. The plant reproduces vegetatively, sending up new sprouts from an elongated rhizome system.

== Conservation ==
Critical habitat was declared for the species in 2010, listing areas that should be protected for the survival of the plant. Protected areas containing this plant include sections of land in the cities of Temecula and Oceanside, near Fallbrook and Lake Hodges, and within the bounds of Mission Trails Regional Park and the San Diego National Wildlife Refuge.

One threat to the species is the invasion of non-native weeds, which tower over the plant and shade it out. It is challenging to remove the dense stands of weeds without injuring the rare plant.
