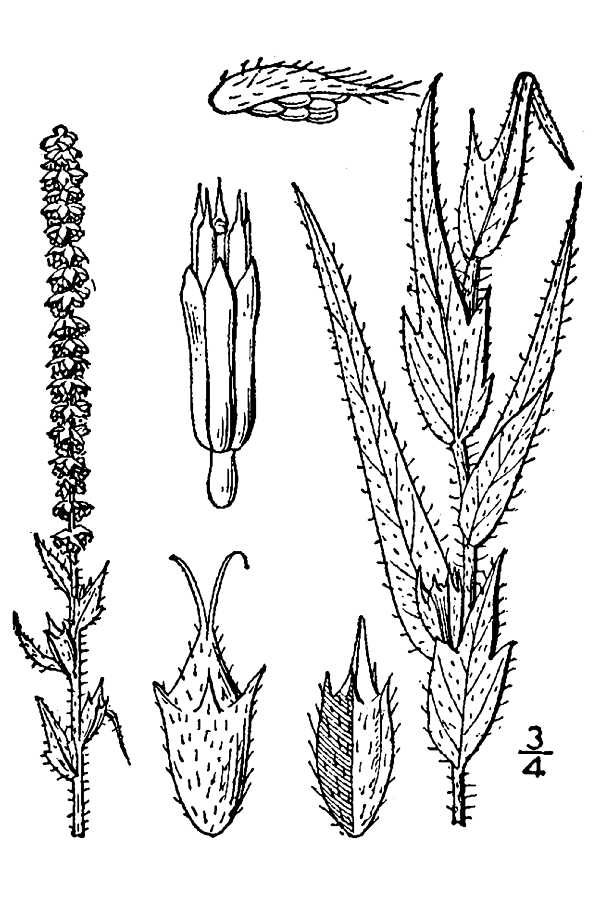

Scientific classification
- Kingdom: Plantae
- Clade: Tracheophytes
- Clade: Angiosperms
- Clade: Eudicots
- Clade: Asterids
- Order: Asterales
- Family: Asteraceae
- Genus: Ambrosia
- Species: A. bidentata

Binomial name
- Ambrosia bidentata Michx.

= Ambrosia bidentata =

Species of flowering plant

Ambrosia bidentata, the lanceleaf ragweed, is a North American species of plants in the family Asteraceae. It is native to the central and eastern parts of the United States, primarily the Mississippi Valley and the eastern Great Plains.

Ambrosia bidentata is an annual herb up to 100 cm (40 inches) tall. Leaves have only a few lobes compared to the complexly divided leaves of some related species, sometimes no lobes at all. Flower heads are small and inconspicuous, as the plant is wind-pollinated. The heads develop into spiny burs as the seeds ripen.
