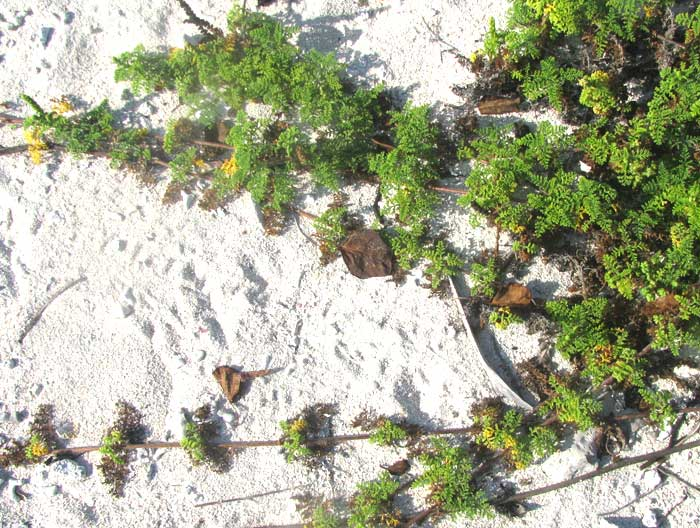
- Coastal ragweed stems growing across beach sand

Conservation status
- Secure (NatureServe)

Scientific classification
- Kingdom: Plantae
- Clade: Tracheophytes
- Clade: Angiosperms
- Clade: Eudicots
- Clade: Asterids
- Order: Asterales
- Family: Asteraceae
- Tribe: Heliantheae
- Genus: Ambrosia
- Species: A. hispida

Binomial name
- Ambrosia hispida Pursh

Synonyms
- Ambrosia crithmifolia DC.; Ambrosia maritima Ferrero ex DC.

= Ambrosia hispida =

Species of plant

Ambrosia hispida, the coastal ragweed, is a species of perennial plant native to the Neotropics. It belongs to the family Asteraceae.

== Description ==
Common features of coastal ragweed:

- Stems lie flat on the ground or spread atop other vegetation and may grow longer than 80 cm (31 in).
- Leaves mostly occur in pairs opposite one another, with petioles up to 2.5 cm (1 in) long. Blades usually are widest below their middles and are twice- or three-times divided into slender lobes covered with tiny, stiff, straight hairs (trichomes).
- As with all ragweed species, the florets are unisexual and gathered into small heads with involucral bracts forming structures looking like cup-shaped calyces. In this species 5 to 20 or more male florets with whitish or purplish corollas shaped more or less like tiny funnels form heads up to 2 mm (1/8 in) across, and occupy the upper part of the slender, raceme-type inflorescence. Female florets without corollas cluster below the male ones.
- One-seeded, cypsela-type fruits are hard, somewhat pear-shaped, black burs up to 2 mm (1/8 in) long with, on the upper part, 0-5 spines or tubercles up to about 0.5 mm (1/32 in) long and with straight tips.

== Distribution ==
Coastal ragweed occurs in the US state of Florida, in Mexico's Yucatán Peninsula and the state of Veracruz, as well as Belize, Honduras, islands of the Caribbean, and Guyana in South America.

== Habitat ==
In Florida, coastal ragweed inhabits coastal beaches and strand. In the Bahamas, it also occurs among dunes. In Mexico's Yucatán Peninsula, it is found in mangrove forest and regularly flooded forests of other types.

== Human uses ==
=== In landscaping and gardening ===
As an ornamental plant it is noted for its conspicuous foliage, and recommended for use as a ground cover in sunny, dry sites, where it spreads by rooting at stem nodes. However, it does poorly if overwatered, and its wind-borne pollen can cause allergic reactions.

=== In traditional medicine ===
In Mexico's Yucatán Peninsula, coastal ragweed, known in Maya as muuch' kook, is mashed in alcohol to produce an extract to treat rheumatism and to increase perspiration. A small cup containing an infusion of the extract taken every night lowers blood pressure and fever. In the Bahamas, coastal ragweed, known as Sweet Bay and other names, is used to treat colds and flu, to deal with gastrointestinal issues ranging from increasing appetite to diarrhea and vomiting, as well as for skin problems such as blisters and general skin irritation. In Dominica, West Indies, it is commonly used to treat intestinal worms.

== Taxonomy ==
Confusion has arisen regarding these two taxa:

- Ambrosia hispida Pursh
- Ambrosia hispida Torr.

The first is featured on this page. The second is a synonym of Ambrosia psilostachya.

In 1814 when Frederick Traugott Pursh formally named and described Ambrosia hispida, he noted the species as present in the US state of South Carolina (not known from there now), and mentioned the botanist Mark Catesby and the "Herb. Sherard." The Sherard Herbarium is at the University of Oxford.

=== Etymology ===
The genus name Ambrosia is thought to refer to the Greek ambrosia, the mythical food of the Greek gods, though it is unclear why Linnaeus related the two concepts.

The species name hispida is New Latin from the Latin hispĭdus meaning "rough, shaggy, hairy, bristly, prickly."

== Gallery ==
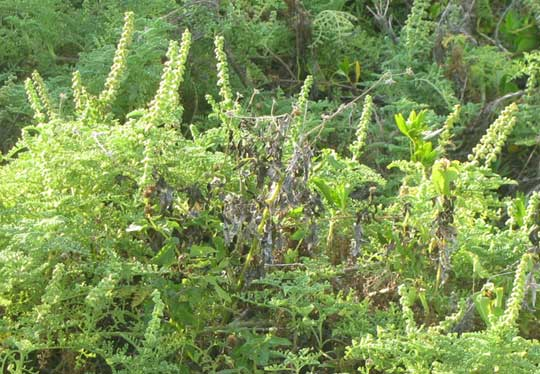
Slender inflorescences rising above plants

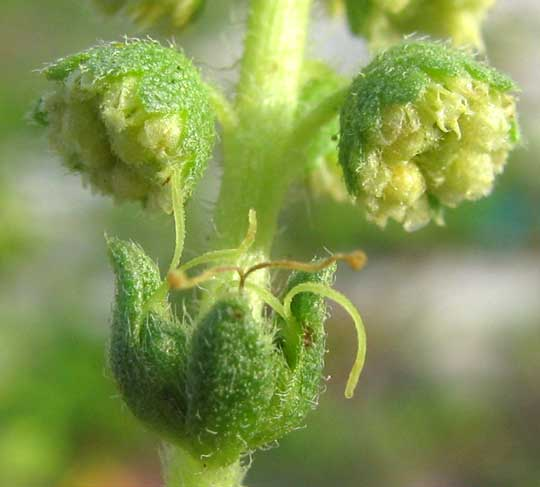
Female florets below, male above

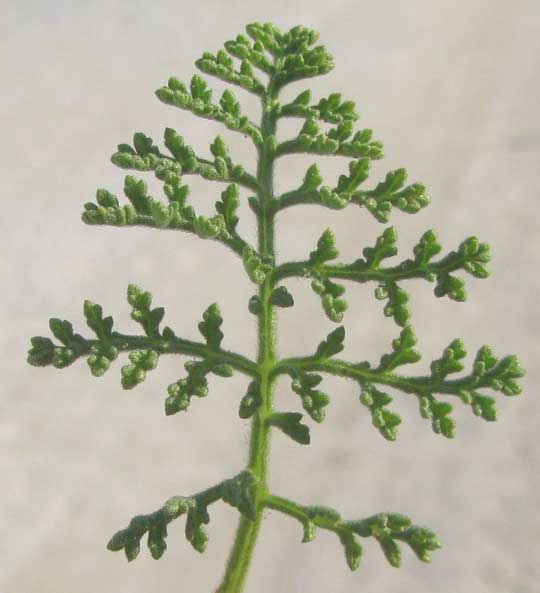
Leaf 3-times divided into lobes

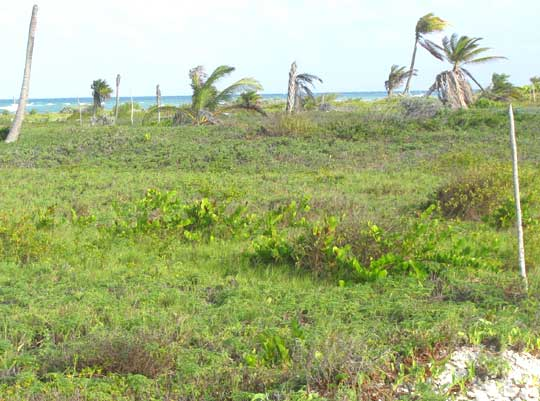
Plants in habitat near the beach
