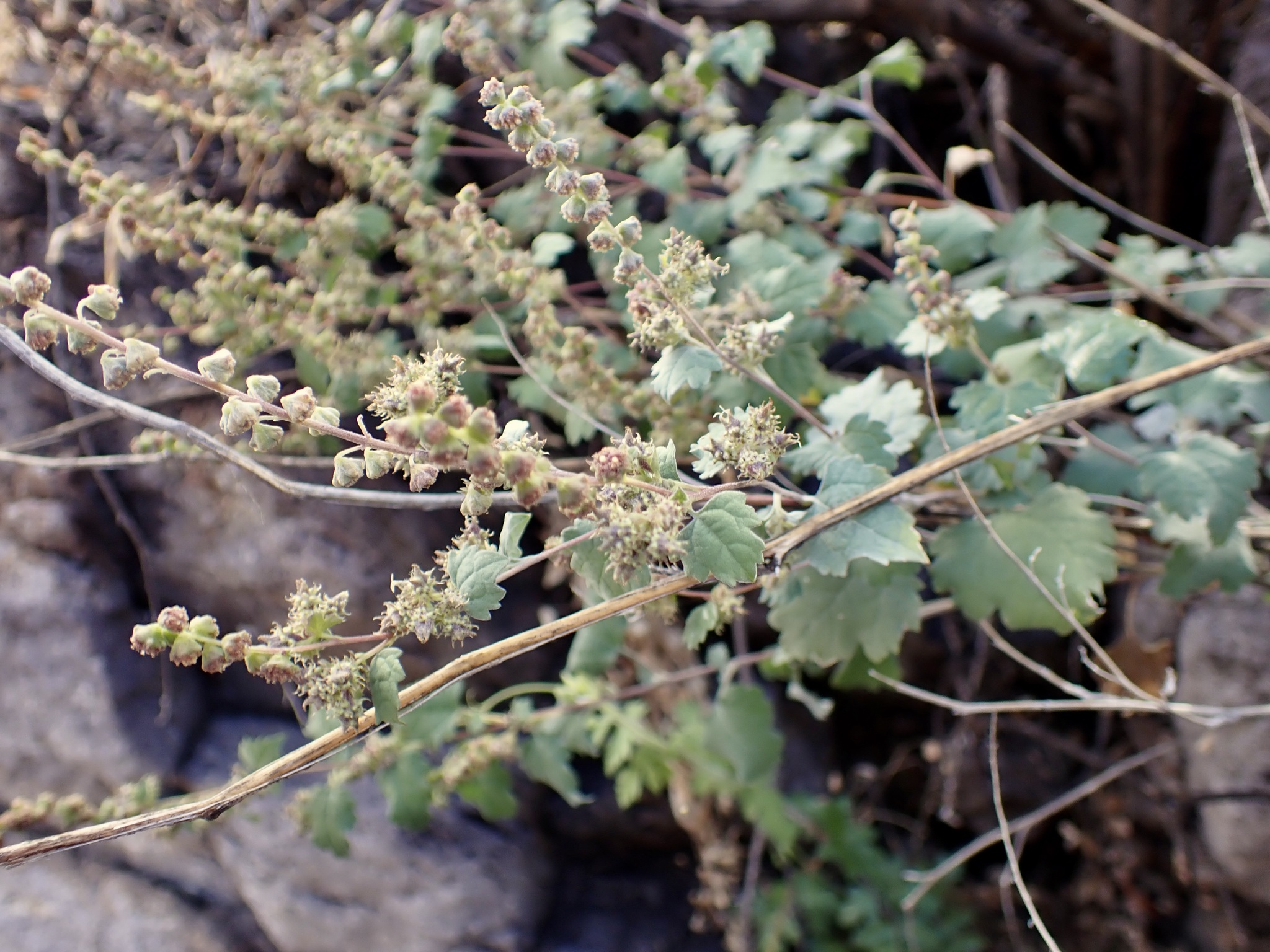

Scientific classification
- Kingdom: Plantae
- Clade: Embryophytes
- Clade: Tracheophytes
- Clade: Angiosperms
- Clade: Eudicots
- Clade: Asterids
- Order: Asterales
- Family: Asteraceae
- Tribe: Heliantheae
- Genus: Ambrosia
- Species: A. cordifolia

Binomial name
- Ambrosia cordifolia (A. Gray) W.W. Payne

Synonyms
- Franseria cordifolia A.Gray; Franseria malvacea Rydb.; Gaertnera cordifolia (A.Gray) Kuntze; Gaertneria cordifolia (A.Gray) Kuntze

= Ambrosia cordifolia =

Species of flowering plant

Ambrosia cordifolia, called the Tucson bur ragweed, is a North American species of plant in the family Asteraceae. It is native to northern Mexico (Sonora, Sinaloa, San Luis Potosí, Guanajuato, Baja California Sur) and the State of Arizona in the United States.

Ambrosia cordifolia is a shrub up to 50 cm (20 inches) tall. Leaves are triangular or heart-shaped. Flower heads are small and inconspicuous, as the plant is wind-pollinated. The heads develop into spiny burs as the seeds ripen.

The reference to the Arizona city of Tucson in the common name refers to the species' first discovery by Cyrus G. Pringle in the mountains near Tucson in 1884.
