= Ambrosia linearis =

Conservation status
- Vulnerable (NatureServe)

Scientific classification
- Kingdom: Plantae
- Clade: Tracheophytes
- Clade: Angiosperms
- Clade: Eudicots
- Clade: Asterids
- Order: Asterales
- Family: Asteraceae
- Tribe: Heliantheae
- Genus: Ambrosia
- Species: A. linearis

Binomial name
- Ambrosia linearis (Rydb.) Payne

Synonyms
- Franseria linearis (Rydb.) Rydb.; Gaertneria linearis Rydb.

Species of flowering plant

Ambrosia linearis is a species of flowering plant in the family Asteraceae known by the common names streaked bur ragweed, Colorado bursage, linear-leaf bursage, and plains ragweed. It is endemic to east-central part of the state of Colorado in the United States, where it occurs in Elbert, Pueblo, El Paso, Cheyenne, Crowley, Kiowa and Lincoln Counties.

This species is a perennial herb or subshrub growing up to 40 centimeters or more in height. The leaves are mostly linear. Some are divided into lobes which are linear. They vary in length, measuring up to a few centimeters long. Like some other Ambrosia, the male and female flower heads are clustered separately on the inflorescence. The female head has a single floret while the male head contains several. The fruits are contained within a spiny bur. The plant can reproduce vegetatively as well as sexually.

There are many populations of this plant, but several are basically "roadside occurrences that occupy ditches." It commonly occurs along roadsides; in fact, "most of the eastern half of El Paso County is one vast roadside occurrence of this species". Otherwise, the plant grows in playa lakes and other seasonally wet habitat types. This bursage is adapted to the disturbance created by the seasonal cycle in this part of the shortgrass prairie vegetation. Fewer populations occur in this good quality habitat than on roadsides and in ditches.

This species is threatened by the development of land for housing and agriculture, which consumes terrain with playa lakes and other appropriate native habitat.
