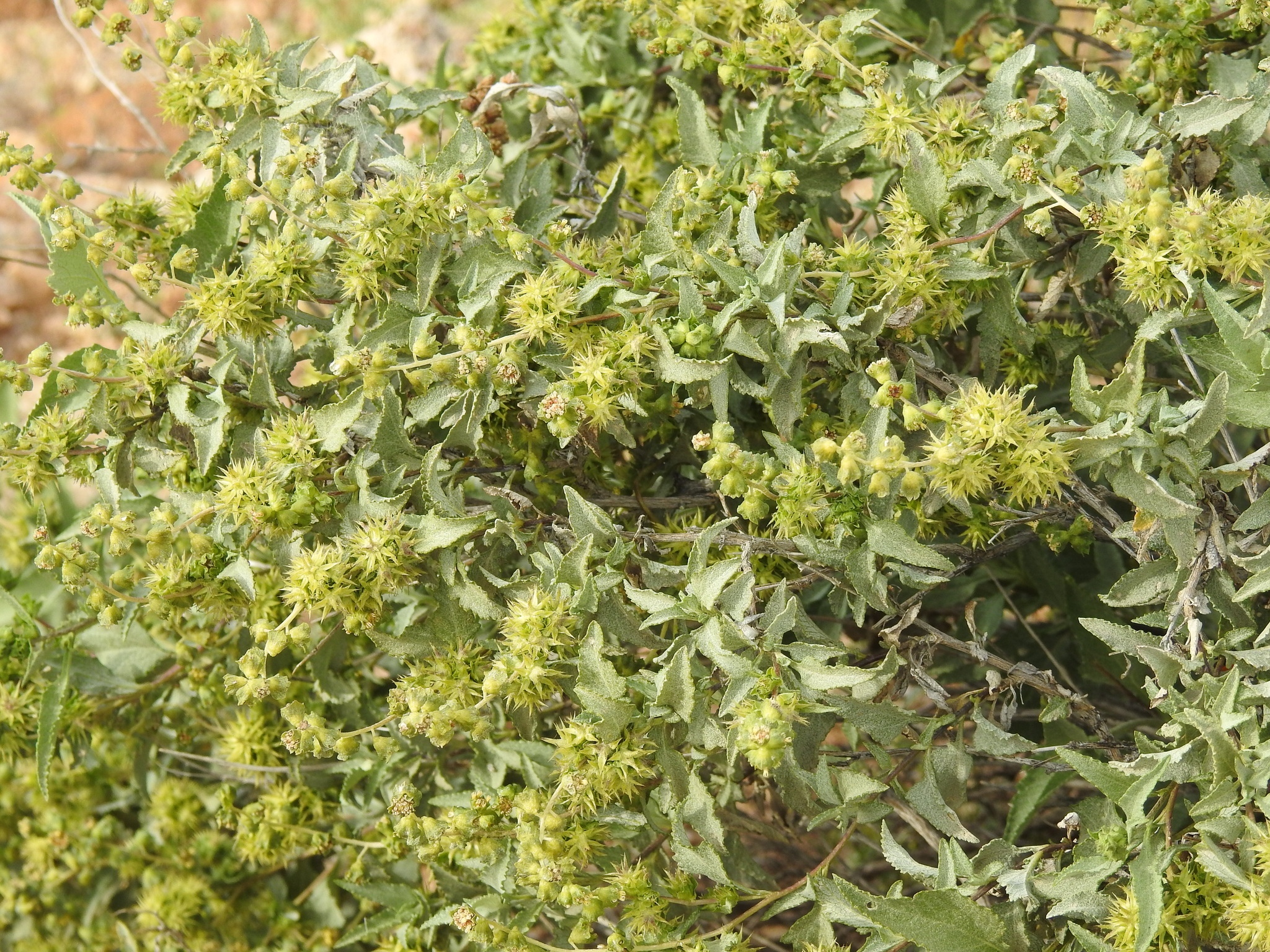

Conservation status
- Apparently Secure (NatureServe)

Scientific classification
- Kingdom: Plantae
- Clade: Tracheophytes
- Clade: Angiosperms
- Clade: Eudicots
- Clade: Asterids
- Order: Asterales
- Family: Asteraceae
- Tribe: Heliantheae
- Genus: Ambrosia
- Species: A. deltoidea

Binomial name
- Ambrosia deltoidea (Torr.) Payne

Synonyms
- Franseria deltoidea Torr.; Gaertnera deltoidea (Torr.) Kuntze; Gaertneria deltoidea (Torr.) Kuntze

= Ambrosia deltoidea =

Species of flowering plant

Ambrosia deltoidea is a North American species of flowering plant in the family Asteraceae known by the common names triangle bur ragweed, triangle bursage, and triangleleaf bursage.

== Distribution and habitat ==
The plant is native to the Sonoran Desert region of North America, where it can be found in Baja California, Baja California Sur, and Sonora in Mexico, with its distribution extending north into Arizona in the United States.

This shrub grows in desert habitat, such as desert grasslands and shrublands. It is a dominant or codominant species, and one of the most abundant plants, in the Arizona Upland Subdivision of the Sonoran Desert. It may occur in upper and lower bajadas, but it is most often found in the ecotone between them. It can be found in open areas. It grows on steep, rocky slopes alongside cacti such as the saguaro and paloverde such as the yellow paloverde. Other plants in the habitat include condalia, ocotillo, jatropha, and prickly pears. The bursage easily invades grassland that has been overgrazed. Areas protected from grazing have less bursage.

== Description ==
Ambrosia deltoidea is a shrub growing from a taproot with many lateral and adventitious roots. The plant produces many thin branches growing up to about half a meter tall. It generally has many dead branches tangled in the living crown. It is drought-deciduous. The leaves are no more than 2 centimeters long. The branches and new leaves are coated thinly in woolly fibers; the leaves become hairless with age.

The inflorescence is a spike of several staminate flower heads. There are often some pistillate heads just below these, with some pistillate heads borne on lateral branches. The fruit is an achene covered in spines. The achenes are usually dispersed when they stick to animals. The plant has been observed to have a lifespan of about 50 years.

== Uses ==
This plant acts as a nurse plant for other species, providing shade and increased soil nitrogen for young growing plants. It also protects seedlings from herbivory. It is the main nurse plant for saguaro in Organ Pipe National Monument. It also serves as nurse plant for yellow paloverde, ocotillo, and some prickly pear species. Most bursage plants are associated with a perennial plant.

This plant is not palatable to mammals and it is not grazed by livestock.

Airborne allergens from this plant can cause contact dermatitis in humans.
