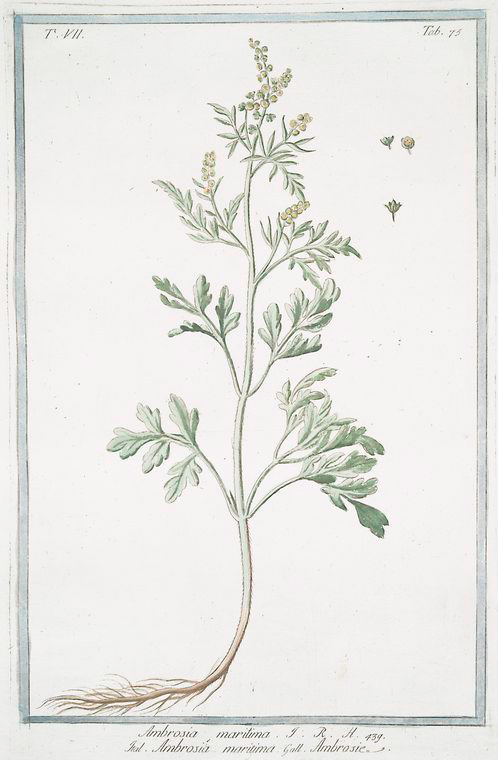

Scientific classification
- Kingdom: Plantae
- Clade: Embryophytes
- Clade: Tracheophytes
- Clade: Angiosperms
- Clade: Eudicots
- Clade: Asterids
- Order: Asterales
- Family: Asteraceae
- Tribe: Heliantheae
- Genus: Ambrosia
- Species: A. maritima

Binomial name
- Ambrosia maritima L.

Synonyms
- Ambrosia senegalensis

= Ambrosia maritima =

Species of plant

Ambrosia maritima, the sea ragweed, is a species of herb in the family Asteraceae. They have a self-supporting growth form and broad leaves. Individuals can grow to 40 cm (16 in).

== Sources ==
This article incorporates text from a free content work. Licensed under CC0 (license statement/permission). Text taken from Ambrosia maritima. Encyclopedia of Life.
