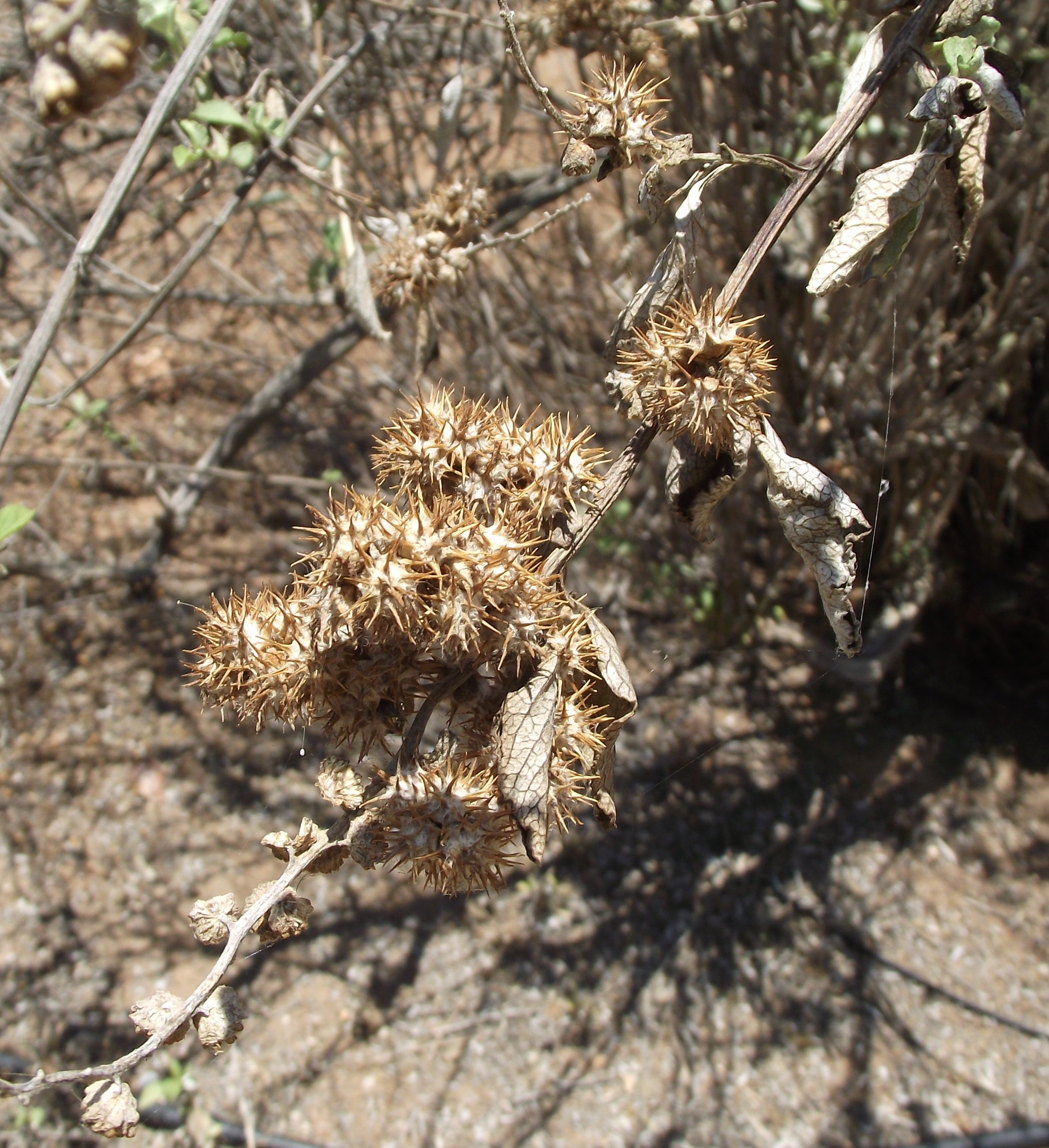

Conservation status
- Vulnerable (NatureServe)

Scientific classification
- Kingdom: Plantae
- Clade: Tracheophytes
- Clade: Angiosperms
- Clade: Eudicots
- Clade: Asterids
- Order: Asterales
- Family: Asteraceae
- Tribe: Heliantheae
- Genus: Ambrosia
- Species: A. chenopodiifolia

Binomial name
- Ambrosia chenopodiifolia (Benth.) Payne

Synonyms
- Franseria chenopodiifolia Benth.; Franseria lancifolia Rydb.; Gaertneria chenopodiifolia (Benth.) Abrams

= Ambrosia chenopodiifolia =

Species of flowering plant

Ambrosia chenopodiifolia is a species of ragweed known by the common names San Diego bursage and San Diego bur ragweed. It is native to the Mexican states of Baja California and Baja California Sur (Comondu Municipality), as well as to Orange and San Diego Counties it int US State of California. It is a member of the coastal sage scrub plant community.

== Description ==
Ambrosia chenopodiifolia is a thickly branching shrub exceeding 3 meters in maximum height. The leaves are ovals up to 3 centimeters long and coated in white hairs. They are sometimes lobed.

Like other ragweeds it is monoecious, with each inflorescence bearing heads of pistillate (female) flowers below a cluster of staminate (male) flowers. The inflorescence is spiny, especially when in fruit. The fruit is a spherical, woolly bur about half a centimeter long covered in hooked spines.

=== Galls ===
This species is host to the following insect induced gall: Aceria franseriae bead leaf gall mite.
