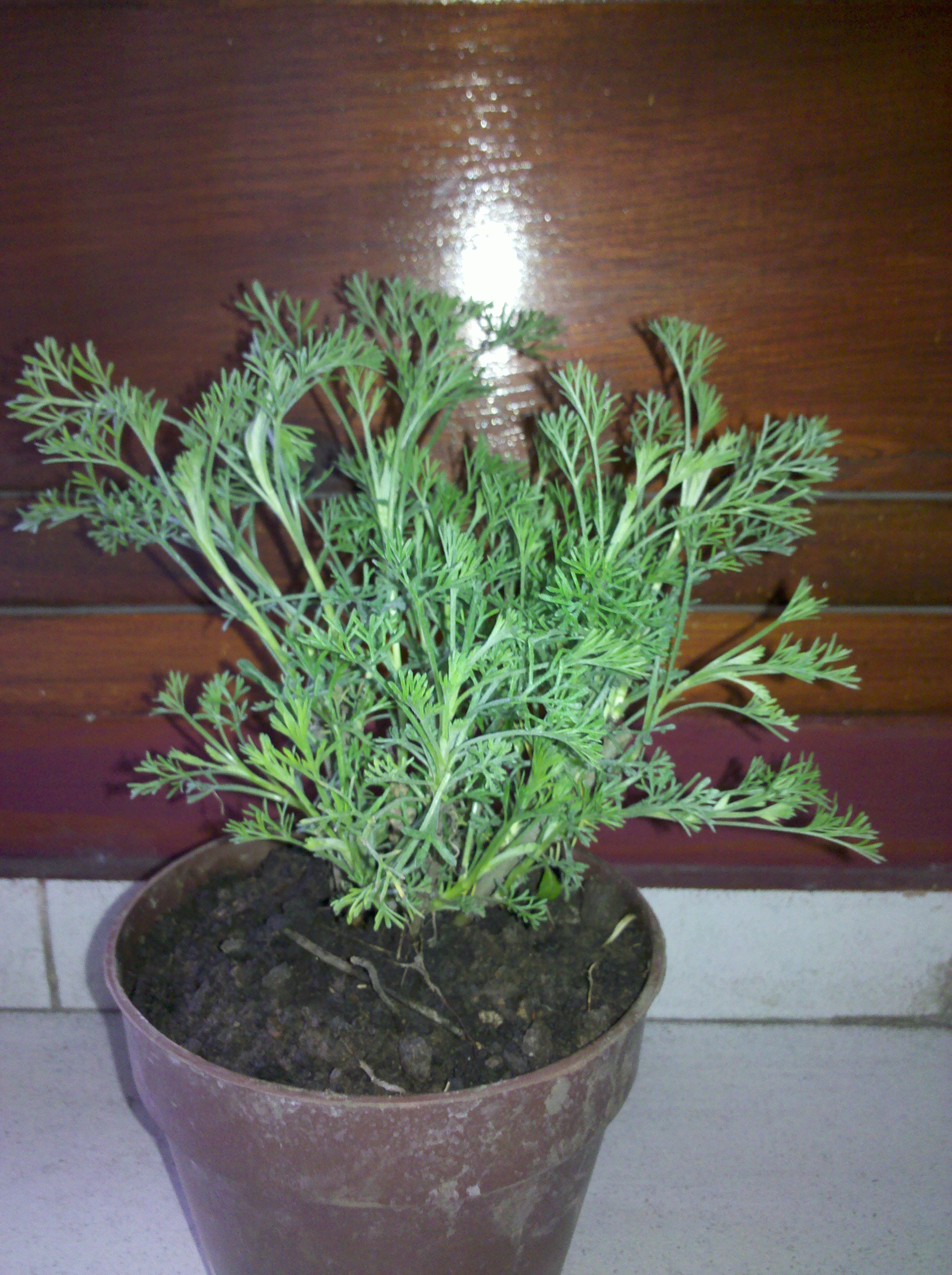

Scientific classification
- Kingdom: Plantae
- Clade: Tracheophytes
- Clade: Angiosperms
- Clade: Eudicots
- Clade: Asterids
- Order: Asterales
- Family: Asteraceae
- Genus: Ambrosia
- Species: A. peruviana

Binomial name
- Ambrosia peruviana Willd.

= Ambrosia peruviana =

Species of plant

Ambrosia peruviana is a species of plant in the family Asteraceae. It occurs from Mexico south to Argentina, being common in the Antilles and the Andes.

In its native range, A. peruviana is used as a medicinal plant with analgesic, antiinflammatory, anthelmintic and antiseptic properties.
