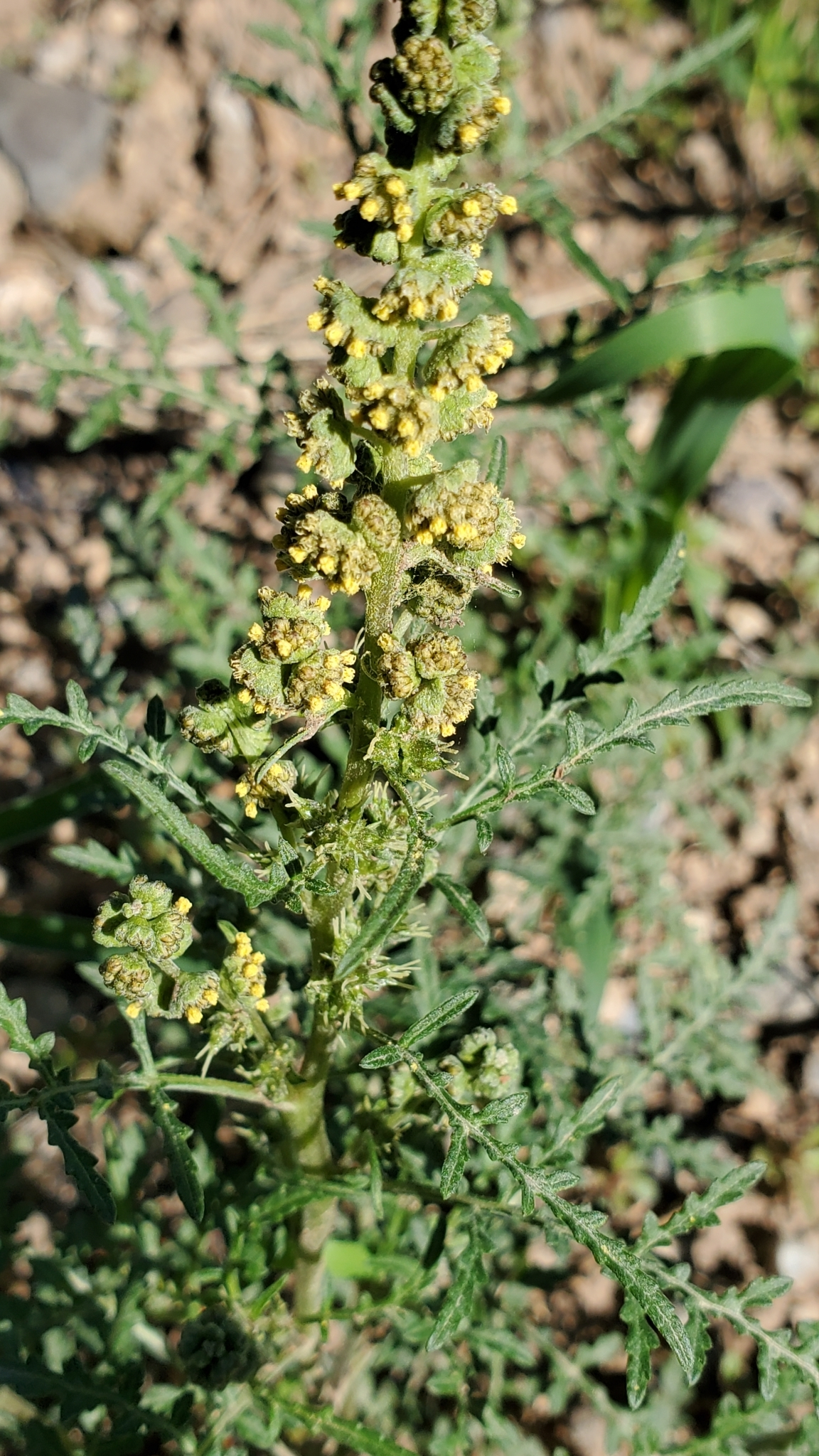

Conservation status
- Apparently Secure (NatureServe)

Scientific classification
- Kingdom: Plantae
- Clade: Tracheophytes
- Clade: Angiosperms
- Clade: Eudicots
- Clade: Asterids
- Order: Asterales
- Family: Asteraceae
- Genus: Ambrosia
- Species: A. tomentosa

Binomial name
- Ambrosia tomentosa Nutt.

Synonyms
- Franseria discolor Nutt.; Franseria exigua Wawra; Gaertneria discolor (Nutt.) Kuntze; Gaertneria tomentosa (Nutt.) Heller; Gaertneria tomentosa (Nutt.) A.Nelson; Xanthidium discolor (Nutt.) Delpino; Franseria tomentosa (Nutt.) A.Nelson, not A.Gray

= Ambrosia tomentosa =

Species of flowering plant

Ambrosia tomentosa, the skeletonleaf bur ragweed, silverleaf povertyweed, or skeleton-leaf bursage, is a North American species of perennial plants in the family Asteraceae.

Skeletonleaf bur ragweed is native to the west-central part of the United States, primarily the western Great Plains, the Colorado Plateau, and eastern Great Basin. It is often found growing alongside roads and in the sandy parts of plains.

It is considered a noxious weed in several states. It is also considered a severe allergen.

== Description ==
Ambrosia tomentosa grows up to 3 feet (91 cm) tall. The deeply lobed hairy leaves grow to 5 inches (12.7 cm) and have toothed margins. Flowers are small and yellow and produce spined 2-seeded burrs. In addition to seeds it can also reproduce via its widely spreading roots.
