= Jessie Lloyd =

Australian writer (1843–1885)

- Born: Jessy Georgianna Bell; 4 June 1843; Launceston, Tasmania
- Died: 30 July 1885 (aged 42); Terembone, Coonamble, New South Wales
- Occupation: writer
- Children: 1 daughter; 3 sons
- Writing career
- Pen name: Silverleaf
- Years active: 1878–1885

Jessie Georgina Lloyd (4 June 1843 – 30 July 1885) was an Australian short-story writer, novelist, poet and essayist who wrote under the pseudonym Silverleaf.

== Early life ==
Lloyd was born at Longford Farm, near Launceston. She was the daughter of Joseph William Bell, an auctioneer, and Georgiana (née Ford). The family moved to Glenorchy before she married.

Lloyd married George Alfred Lloyd (1843–1921) at the Wesleyan Church, O'Brien's Bridge (now Glenorchy) on 6 September 1866. After her marriage, she moved with her husband to New South Wales. Their daughter was born in Sydney the following year. Lloyd's husband bought a share in a property, Terembone, near Coonamble and that became her home for the rest of her life. Three sons were born there.

== Career ==
In the late 1870s Lloyd began contributing to Sydney newspapers and periodicals, using "Silverleaf" as her pen name. From the money she earned, she was able to educate her two eldest children at boarding schools in Sydney.

Lloyd was known as author of "All Aboard", a Christmas story published in The Echo when her first book was published in 1880. She dedicated this novel, The Wheel of Life, to Lady Robinson, wife of Hercules Robinson, then Governor of New South Wales. The Sydney Morning Herald critic reviewed it favourably, but chastised the proofreader for the number of printer's errors.

In 1881 the Illustrated Sydney News and New South Wales Agriculturalist and Grazier published Lloyd's "Silverleaf Papers", a series of essays on topics such as "New Chums", "Glimpses of Station Life", "Seasons of Drought", "Squatters versus Selectors", "Natives" and two articles on housekeeping. The series continued under the monthly's new name, Illustrated Sydney News, with the publication of "A Merry Christmas!" and ran through 1882, including two essays on land legislation, which drew a response from Colin Macdonald in the Australian Town and Country Journal. Simultaneously, she wrote two serialised short stories, "The Willoughbys" and "The Legend of the Red Bluff" published by The Sydney Mail and New South Wales Advertiser. In 1884 she began writing for The Daily Telegraph.

== Works ==
=== Novels ===
- The Wheel of Life: A Domestic Tale of Life in Australia, George Robertson, 1880
- "Retribution", serialised in the Illustrated Sydney News, four or five chapters per month, over 13 months

=== Short stories ===
- "The Willoughbys"
- "The Legend of the Red Bluff"

== Personal ==
Lloyd died on 30 July 1885 at her home, Terembone, Coonamble after a long illness.
