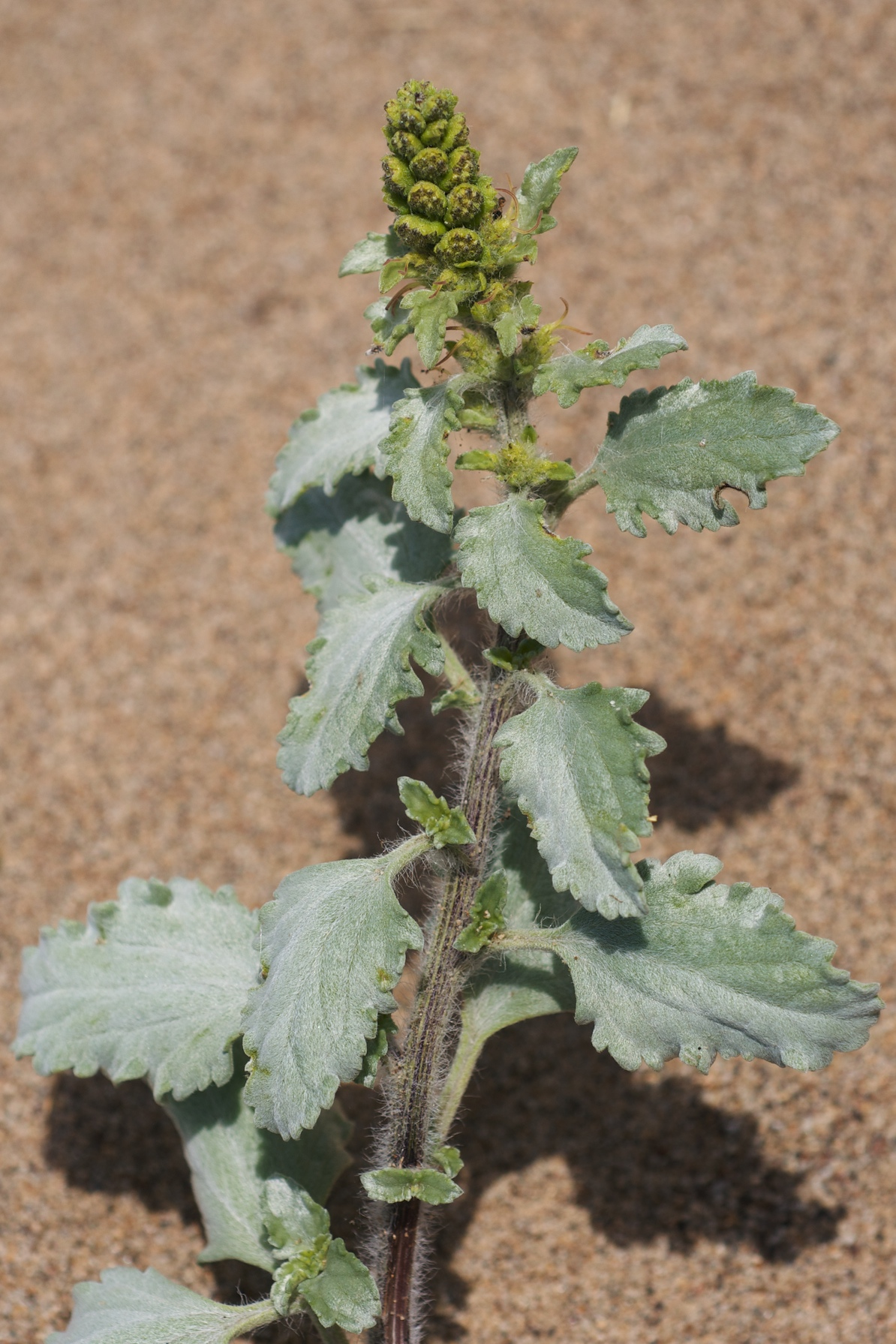

Conservation status
- Secure (NatureServe)

Scientific classification
- Kingdom: Plantae
- Clade: Embryophytes
- Clade: Tracheophytes
- Clade: Angiosperms
- Clade: Eudicots
- Clade: Asterids
- Order: Asterales
- Family: Asteraceae
- Tribe: Heliantheae
- Genus: Ambrosia
- Species: A. chamissonis

Binomial name
- Ambrosia chamissonis (Less.) Greene

Synonyms
- Ambrosia bipinnatifida Greene; Franseria bipinnatifida (Less.) Nutt.; Franseria chamissonis Less.; Franseria cuneifolia Nutt.; Franseria lessingii Meyen & Walp.; Franseria villosa Rydb.; Gaertneria bipinnatifida Kuntze; Gaertneria chamissonis (Less.) Kuntze

= Ambrosia chamissonis =

Species of flowering plant

Ambrosia chamissonis is a species of ragweed known by the common names silver burr ragweed, silver beachweed and (silver) beach bur(r).

It is known from most of the coastline of western North America from Alaska to Baja California, where it is a resident of beaches and other sandy coastal habitats.

== Description ==
Ambrosia chamissonis is a large, sprawling perennial herb exceeding 3 metres (9.8 ft) in maximum width. The stems are roughly or softly hairy and longitudinally ridged. The plentiful leaves are a few centimeters long, woolly and silver-green, and variable in shape.

The plant is monoecious, with male and female flowers on each individual. Staminate (male) flower heads containing many pale colored florets occur at the tip of the inflorescence, with pistillate (female) flower heads clustered below them. Each pistillate head contains a single tiny flower which develops into a fruit. The fruit is a brown bur up to a centimeter wide covered in sharp spines.
