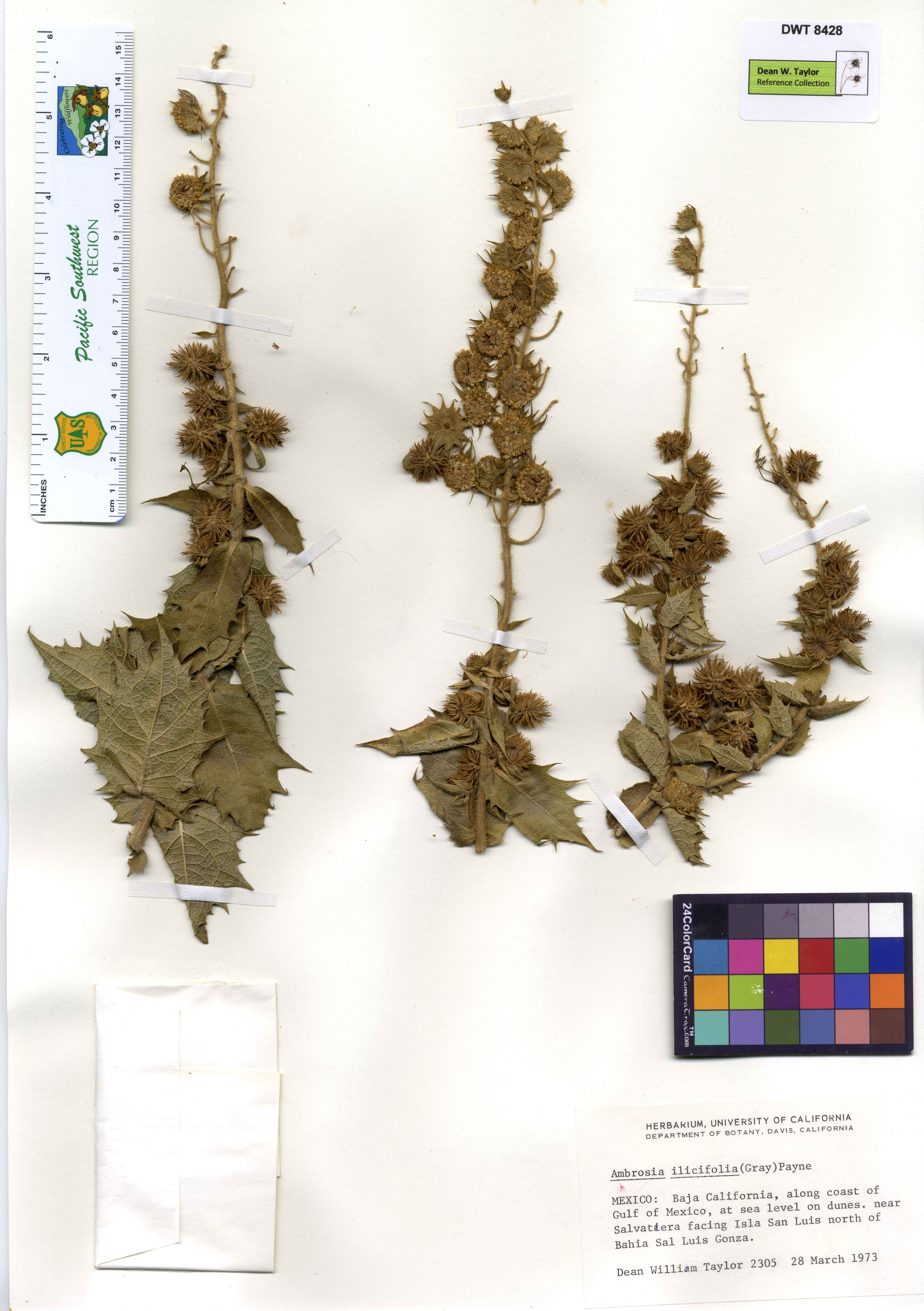

Scientific classification
- Kingdom: Plantae
- Clade: Tracheophytes
- Clade: Angiosperms
- Clade: Eudicots
- Clade: Asterids
- Order: Asterales
- Family: Asteraceae
- Genus: Ambrosia
- Species: A. ilicifolia

Binomial name
- Ambrosia ilicifolia (A.Gray) W.W.Payne

Synonyms
- Franseria ilicifolia A.Gray; Gaertneria ilicifolia (A.Gray) Kuntze

= Ambrosia ilicifolia =

Species of flowering plant

Ambrosia ilicifolia is a species of ragweed known by the common names hollyleaf burr ragweed and hollyleaf bursage.

It is native to the deserts and mountains of western Arizona, and the adjacent Sonoran Desert areas of southeastern California, Sonora and Baja California. It grows in dry washes, scrub, and other local habitats.

== Description ==
Ambrosia ilicifolia is a small, matted shrub under 1 metre (3.3 ft) in height. Its stiff, straight branches are green, glandular, and leafy when young, and light gray and leafless when older. The holly-like leaves are leathery but brittle, oval-shaped to rounded, and edged with spine-tipped teeth. They are green, veiny and sticky with resin.

The inflorescence holds several spiny staminate (male) flower heads next to larger pistillate (female) heads. Each pistillate head produces usually two fruits, which are yellow-brown burrs nearly 2 centimeters wide. Each burr is rounded, sticky, and covered in hooked spines.
