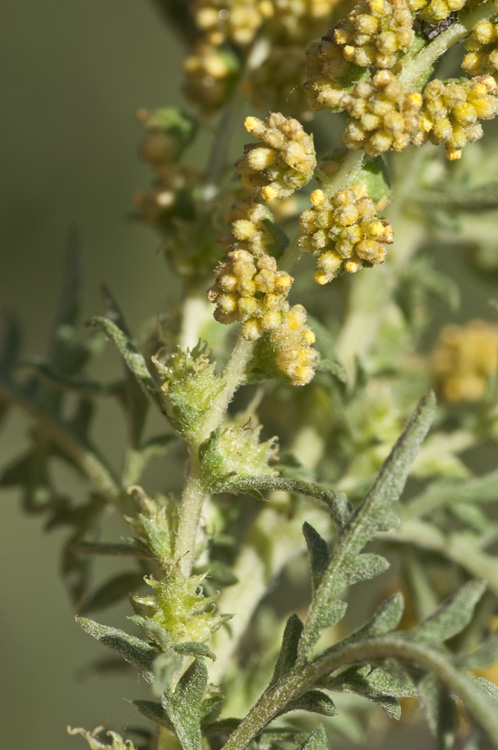

Conservation status
- Secure (NatureServe)

Scientific classification
- Kingdom: Plantae
- Clade: Tracheophytes
- Clade: Angiosperms
- Clade: Eudicots
- Clade: Asterids
- Order: Asterales
- Family: Asteraceae
- Genus: Ambrosia
- Species: A. confertiflora

Binomial name
- Ambrosia confertiflora DC.

Synonyms
- Synonymy: Ambrosia caudata (Rydb.) Shinners; Ambrosia fruticosa DC. 1836 not Medik. 1775; Ambrosia simulans Shinners; Franseria caudata Rydb.; Franseria confertiflora (DC.) Rydb.; Franseria hispidissima Rydb.; Franseria incana Rydb.; Franseria pringlei Rydb.; Franseria strigulosa Rydb.; Franseria tenuifolia Harv. & A.Gray; Gaertneria tenuifolia (Harv. & A.Gray) Kuntze; Gaertneria tenuifolia Harv. & A.Gray; Xanthidium tenuifolium (Harv. & A.Gray) Delpino

= Ambrosia confertiflora =

Species of flowering plant

Ambrosia confertiflora is a North American species of ragweed known by the common name weakleaf bur ragweed.

== Description ==
Ambrosia confertiflorais a perennial herb reaching heights between 30 centimeters and nearly two meters with bristly, fuzzy green to brown erect stems. The multilobed fuzzy leaves have blades which can be nearly 16 centimeters long and are borne on petioles with lobed, winglike appendages. As in other ragweeds, the inflorescence has staminate (male) and pistillate (female) flower heads. The pistillate heads yield one or two fruits which are burrs up to half a centimeter long and covered in short spines.

== Distribution and habitat ==
Ambrosia confertiflora is native to much of northern Mexico (from Sonora to Tamaulipas) and the southwestern United States from California east as far as Kansas, Oklahoma, and central Texas. It is also naturalized in various other regions, and has been declared a noxious weed in Australia and in Israel. It grows in disturbed sites.
