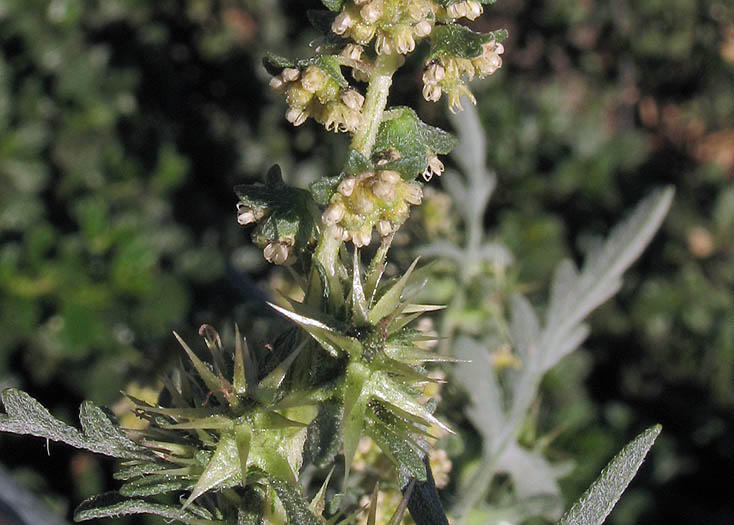

Conservation status
- Secure (NatureServe)

Scientific classification
- Kingdom: Plantae
- Clade: Tracheophytes
- Clade: Angiosperms
- Clade: Eudicots
- Clade: Asterids
- Order: Asterales
- Family: Asteraceae
- Tribe: Heliantheae
- Genus: Ambrosia
- Species: A. acanthicarpa

Binomial name
- Ambrosia acanthicarpa Hook.

Synonyms
- Franseria acanthicarpa (Hook.) Coville; Franseria californica Gand.; Franseria hookeriana Nutt.; Franseria montana Nutt.; Franseria palmeri Rydb.; Gaertneria acanthicarpa (Hook.) Britton; Gaertneria hookeriana (Nutt.) Kuntze

= Ambrosia acanthicarpa =

Species of flowering plant

Ambrosia acanthicarpa is a North American species of bristly annual plants in the family Asteraceae. Members of the genus Ambrosia are called ragweeds. The species has common names including flatspine bur ragweed, Hooker's bur-ragweed, annual burrweed, annual bur-sage, and western sand-bur. The plant is common across much of the western United States and in the Prairie Provinces of Canada.

This spiny, weedy plant grows in clumps of many erect stems which may reach over a meter in height. Its gray-green stems are covered in a coat of stiff, bristly hairs. The few rough leaves are several centimeters long. The racemes of flowers are more plentiful, with each hairy flower head a few millimeters wide. The spiny, burr-like pistillate heads have pointed, twisting bracts and the staminate heads are rounded. The species is adaptable and grows well in disturbed areas, easily becoming weedy.
