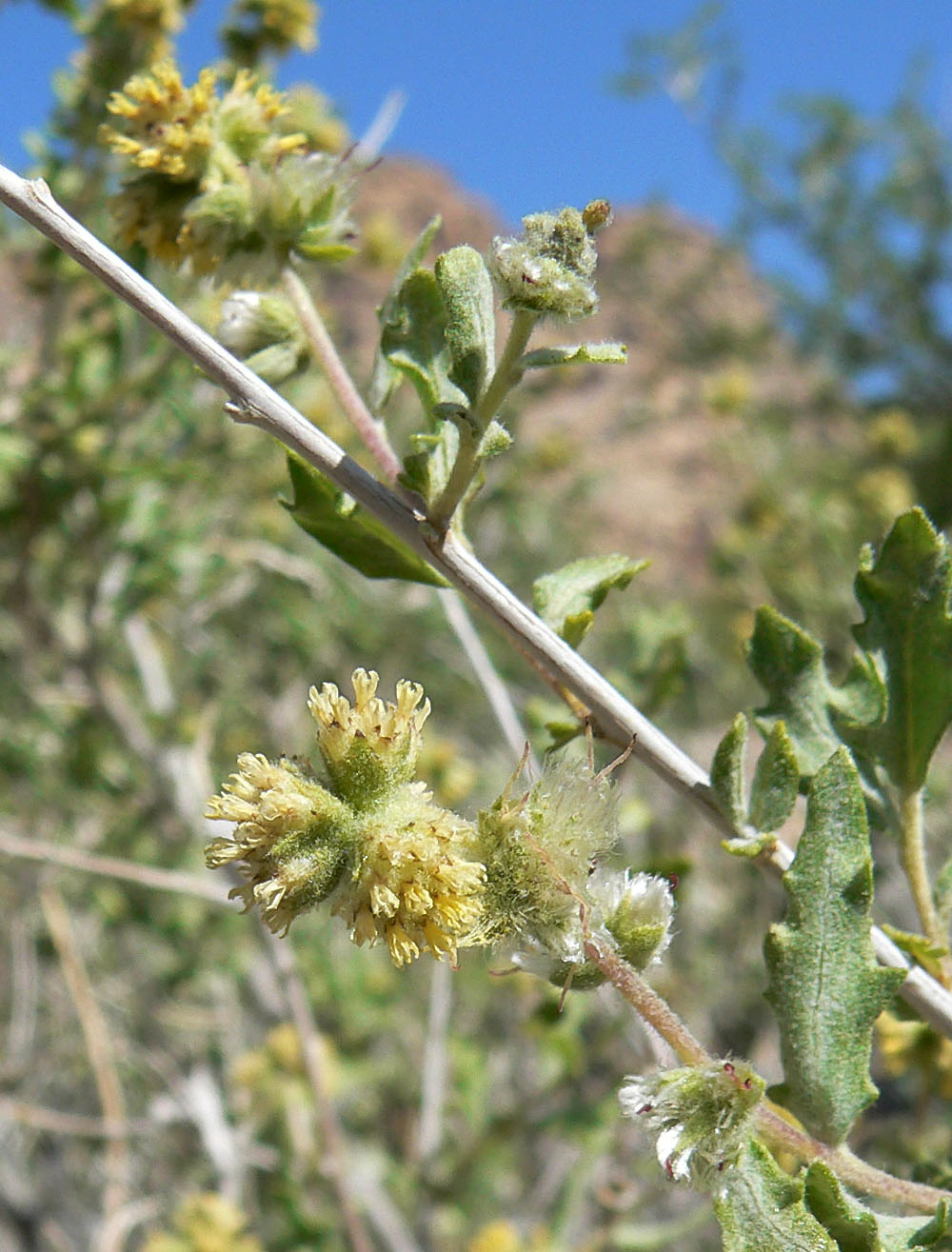
- Woolly bursage on a portion of periodically exposed, dry river bed (Red Rock Canyon in the Spring Mountains of southern Nevada, elevation about 1300 m).

Scientific classification
- Kingdom: Plantae
- Clade: Tracheophytes
- Clade: Angiosperms
- Clade: Eudicots
- Clade: Asterids
- Order: Asterales
- Family: Asteraceae
- Genus: Ambrosia
- Species: A. eriocentra

Binomial name
- Ambrosia eriocentra (A.Gray) W.W.Payne

Synonyms
- Franseria eriocentra A.Gray; Gaertneria eriocentra (A.Gray) Kuntze

= Ambrosia eriocentra =

Woolly bursage

Species of flowering plant

Ambrosia eriocentra is a North American species of ragweed known by the common names woolly bursage and woollyfruit burr ragweed.

== Distribution ==
The plant is native to the Mojave Desert in the southwestern United States, within southern California, southern Nevada, northwestern Arizona, and southwestern Utah.

It grows in the Mojave's plains and mountain ridges up to 1,700 metres (5,600 ft) in elevation.

== Description ==
Ambrosia eriocentra is a rounded shrub reaching over 1.5 metres (4.9 ft) in height. The stems are brownish gray in color, with young twigs coated in light woolly fibers and older branches bare. Leaves are lance-shaped and up to 9 centimeters long, not counting the winged petioles. The leaves have rolled lobed or toothed edges.

As in other ragweeds, the inflorescence has a few staminate (male) flower heads next to several single-flowered pistillate heads. The bloom period is April to June.

The fruit is a green burr with long, silky white hairs and several hair-tufted sharp spines. The burr is around a centimeter long.
