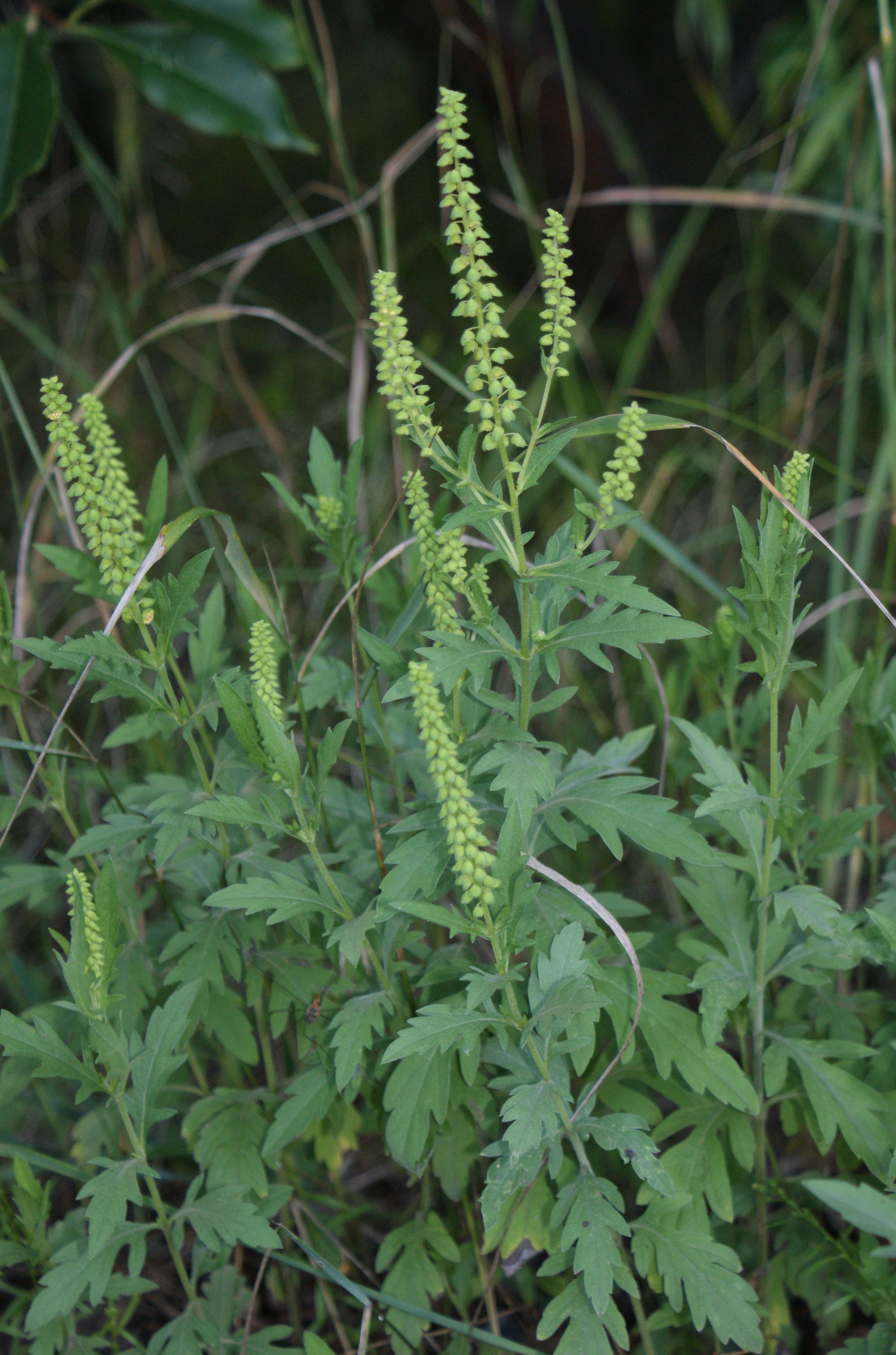
- Ambrosia psilostachya

Scientific classification
- Kingdom: Plantae
- Clade: Tracheophytes
- Clade: Angiosperms
- Clade: Eudicots
- Clade: Asterids
- Order: Asterales
- Family: Asteraceae
- Subfamily: Asteroideae
- Tribe: Heliantheae
- Subtribe: Ambrosiinae
- Genus: Ambrosia; L.

Synonyms
- Acanthambrosia Rydb.; Franseria Cav.; Hymenoclea Torr. & A.Gray ex Torr. & A.Gray; Xanthidium Delpino; Gaertneria Medik.; Hemiambrosia Delpino; Hemixanthidium Delpino

= Ragweed =

Genus of plants

Ragweeds are flowering plants in the genus Ambrosia in the aster family, Asteraceae. They are distributed in the tropical and subtropical regions of the Americas, especially North America, where the origin and center of diversity of the genus are in the southwestern United States and northwestern Mexico. Several species have been introduced to the Old World and some have naturalized and have become invasive species. In Europe, this spread is expected to continue, due to ongoing climate change.

The name "ragweed" is derived from "ragged" + "weed," coming from the ragged appearance of the plant's leaves. Other common names include bursages and burrobrushes. The genus name is from the Greek ambrosia, meaning "food or drink of immortality".

Ragweed pollen is notorious for causing allergic reactions in humans, specifically allergic rhinitis. Up to half of all cases of pollen-related allergic rhinitis in North America are caused by ragweeds.

The most widespread species of the genus in North America is Ambrosia artemisiifolia.

== Description and ecology ==
Ragweeds are annual and perennial herbs and shrubs. Species may grow just a few centimeters tall or exceed four meters (13 ft) in height. The stems are erect, decumbent or prostrate, and many grow from rhizomes. The leaves may be arranged alternately, oppositely, or both. The leaf blades come in many shapes, sometimes divided pinnately or palmately into lobes. The edges are smooth or toothed. Some are hairy, and most are glandular.

Ragweeds are monoecious, most producing inflorescences that contain both staminate and pistillate flowers. Inflorescences are often in the form of a spike or raceme made up mostly of staminate flowers with some pistillate clusters around the base. Staminate flower heads have stamens surrounded by whitish or purplish florets. Pistillate flower heads have fruit-yielding ovules surrounded by many phyllaries and fewer, smaller florets. The pistillate flowers are wind pollinated, and the fruits develop. They are burs, sometimes adorned with knobs, wings, or spines.

Many Ambrosia species occur in desert and semi-desert areas, and many are ruderal species that grow in disturbed habitat types.

== Allergy ==
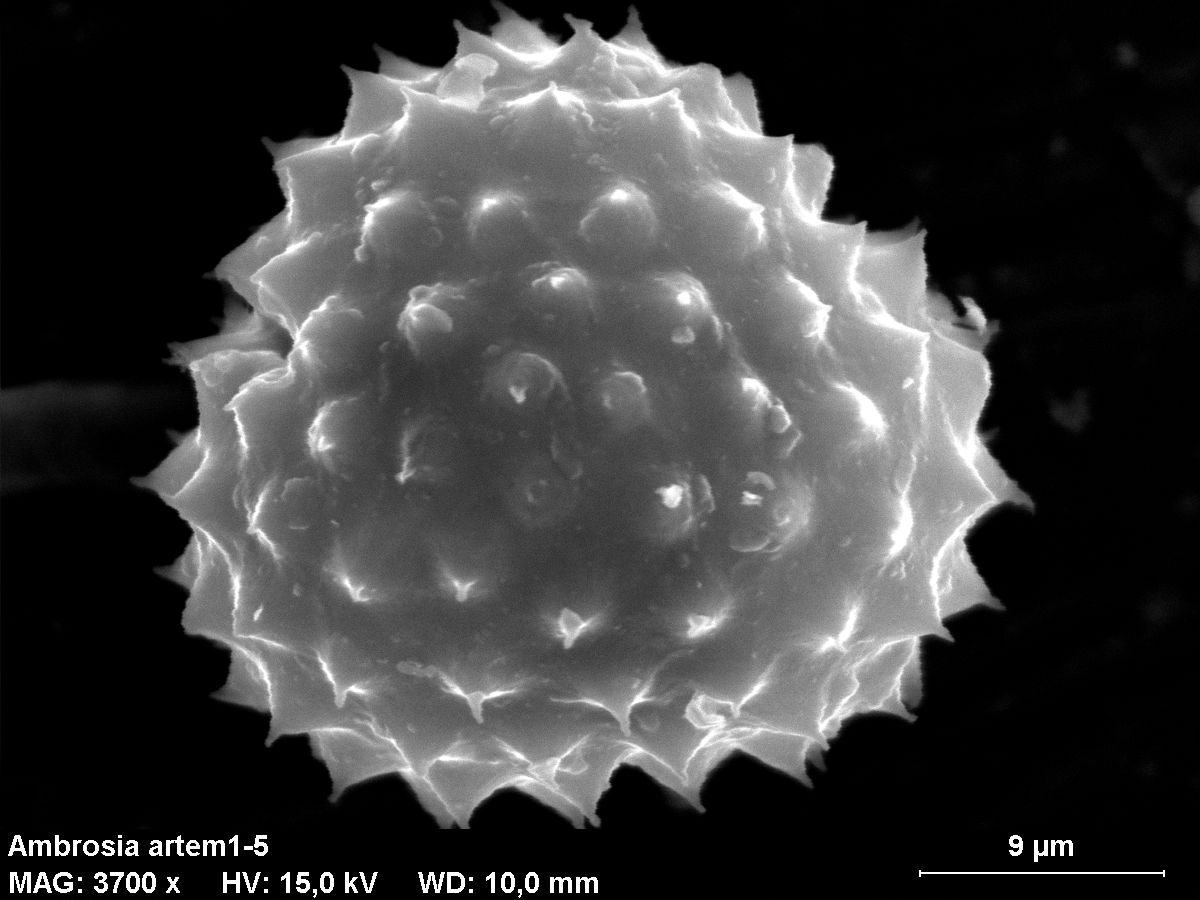
Ambrosia artemisiifolia pollen

Ragweed pollen is a common allergen. A single plant may produce about a billion grains of pollen per season, and the pollen is transported on the wind. It causes about half of all cases of pollen-associated allergic rhinitis in North America, where ragweeds are most abundant and diverse. Common culprits are common ragweed (A. artemisiifolia) and great ragweed (A. trifida).

Concentration of ragweed pollen — in the absence of significant rainfall, which removes pollen from the air — is the lowest in the early morning hours (6:00 AM), when emissions start. Pollen concentration peaks at midday. Ragweed pollen can remain airborne for days and travel great distances, and can even be carried 300–400 miles (500–600 km) out to sea. Ragweeds native to the Americas have been introduced to Europe starting in the nineteenth century and especially during World War I, and have spread rapidly since the 1950s. Eastern Europe, particularly Hungary, has been badly affected by ragweed since the early 1990s, when the dismantling of Communist collective agriculture led to large-scale abandonment of agricultural land, and new building projects also resulted in disturbed, un-landscaped areas.

The major allergenic compound in the pollen has been identified as Amb a 1, a 38 kDa nonglycosylated protein composed of two subunits. It also contains other allergenic components, such as profilin and calcium-binding proteins.

Ragweed allergy sufferers may show signs of oral allergy syndrome, a food allergy classified by a cluster of allergic reactions in the mouth in response to the consumption of certain fruits, vegetables, and nuts. Foods commonly involved include beans, celery, cumin, hazelnuts, kiwifruit, parsley, potatoes, bananas, melons, cucumbers, and zucchini. Because cooking usually denatures the proteins that cause the reaction, the foods are more allergenic when eaten raw; exceptions are celery and nuts, which may not be safe even when cooked. Signs of reaction can include itching, burning, and swelling of the mouth and throat, runny eyes and nose, hives, and, less commonly, vomiting, diarrhea, asthma, and anaphylaxis. These symptoms are due to the abnormal increase of IgE antibodies which attach to a type of immune cell called mast cells. When the ragweed antigen then attaches to these antibodies the mast cells release histamine and other symptom-evoking chemicals.

Merck & Co, under license from allergy immunotherapy (AIT) company ALK, has launched a ragweed allergy immunotherapy treatment in sublingual tablet form in the US.

As of 2006, research into allergy immunotherapy treatment involved administering doses of the allergen to accustom the body to induce specific long-term tolerance.

== Control and eradication ==
Where herbicides cannot be used, mowing may be repeated about every three weeks, as it grows back rapidly. In the past, ragweed was usually cut down, left to dry, and then burned. This method is used less often now, because of the pollution caused by smoke. Manually uprooting ragweed is generally ineffective, and skin contact can cause allergic reaction. If uprooting is the method of choice, it should be performed before flowering. There is evidence that mechanical and chemical control methods are actually no more effective in the long run than leaving the weed in place.

Fungal rusts and the leaf-eating beetle Ophraella communa have been proposed as agents of biological pest control of ragweeds, but the latter may also attack sunflowers, and applications for permits and funding to test these controls have been unsuccessful. The beetle has, however, appeared in Europe, either on its own or as an uncontrolled introduction, and it has started making a dent into Ambrosia populations there.

== Species ==
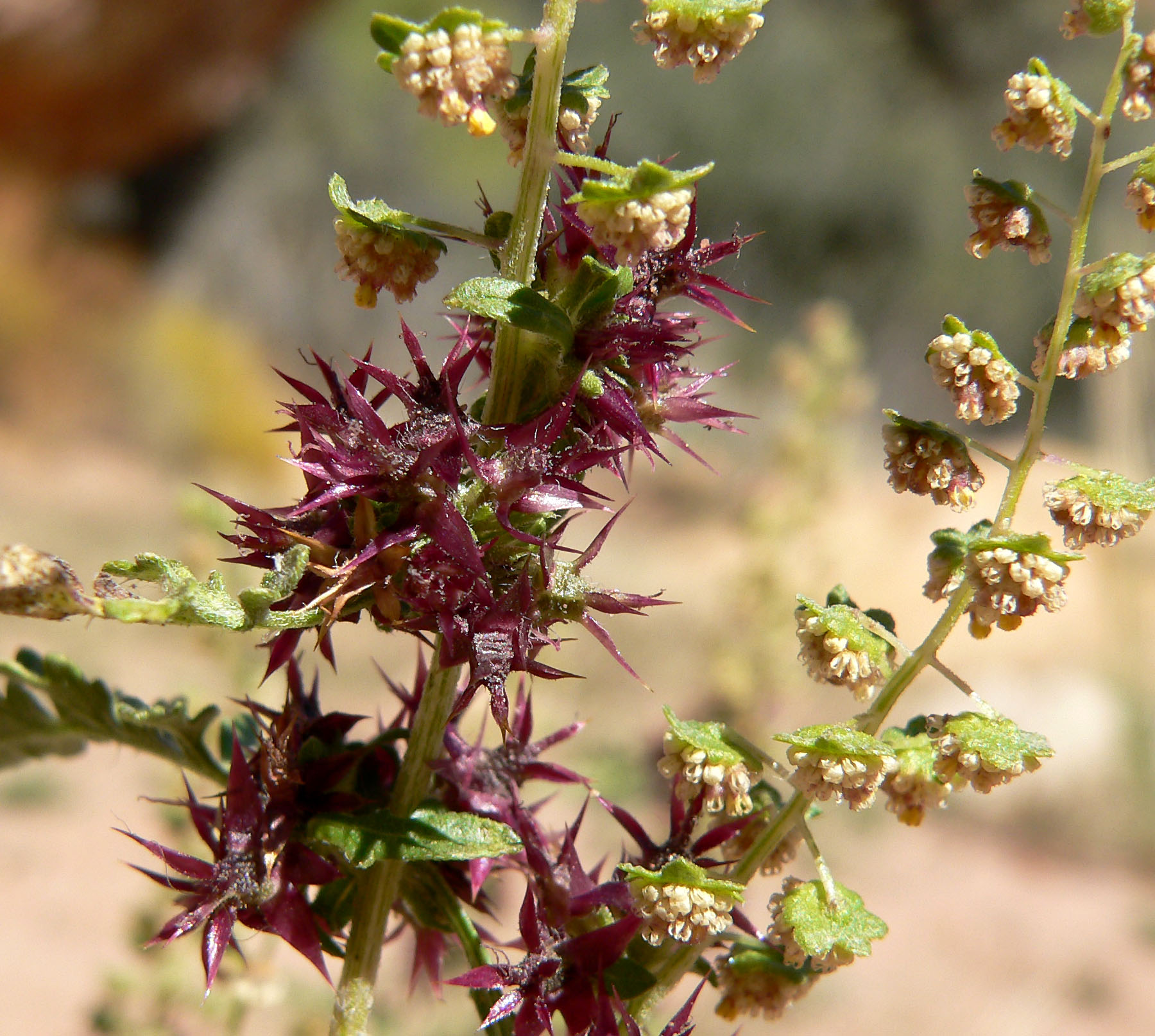
Ambrosia dumosa

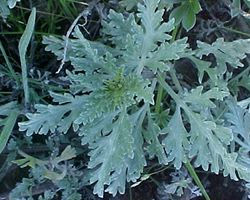
Ambrosia chamissonis

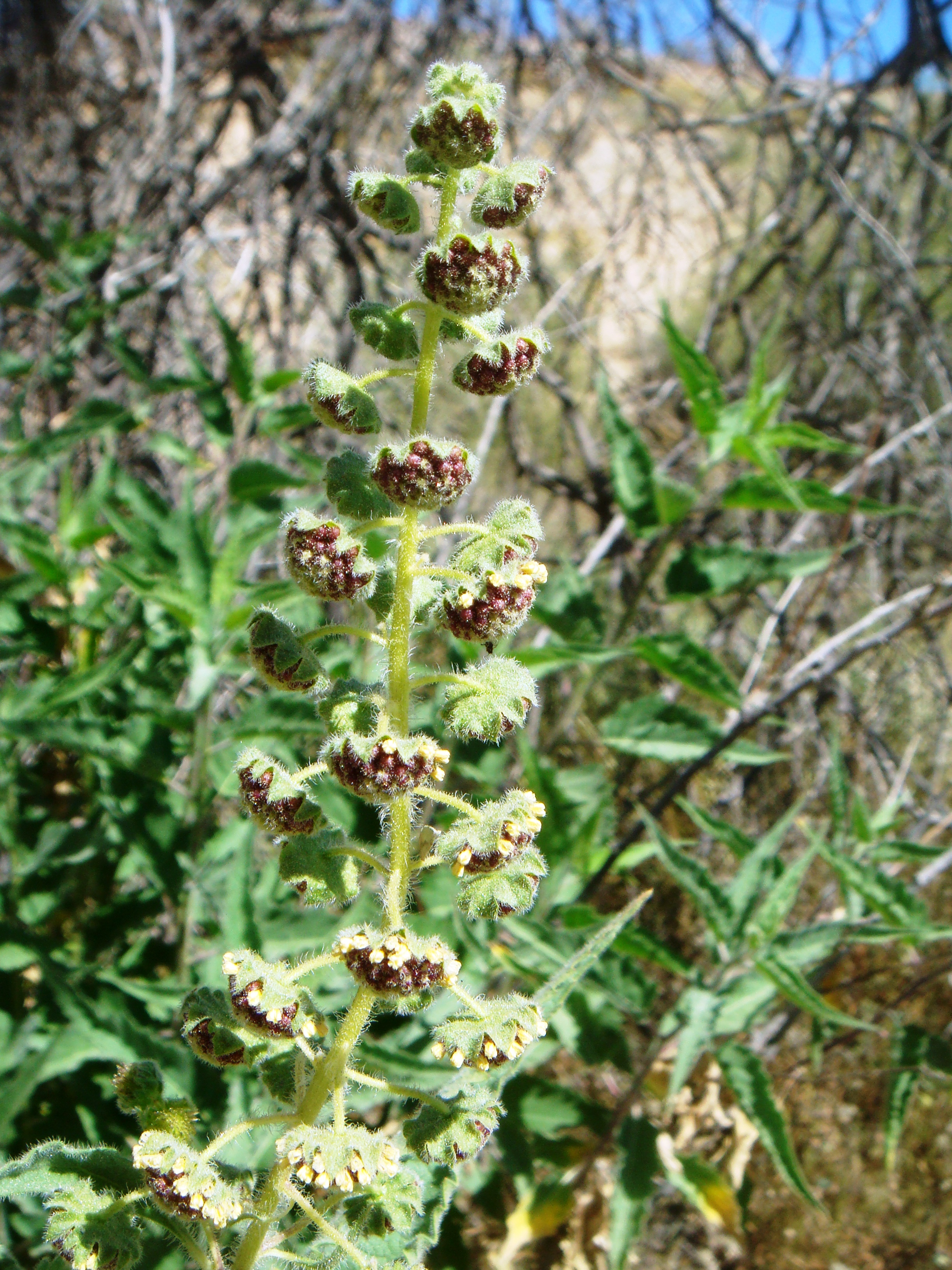
Ambrosia ambrosioides

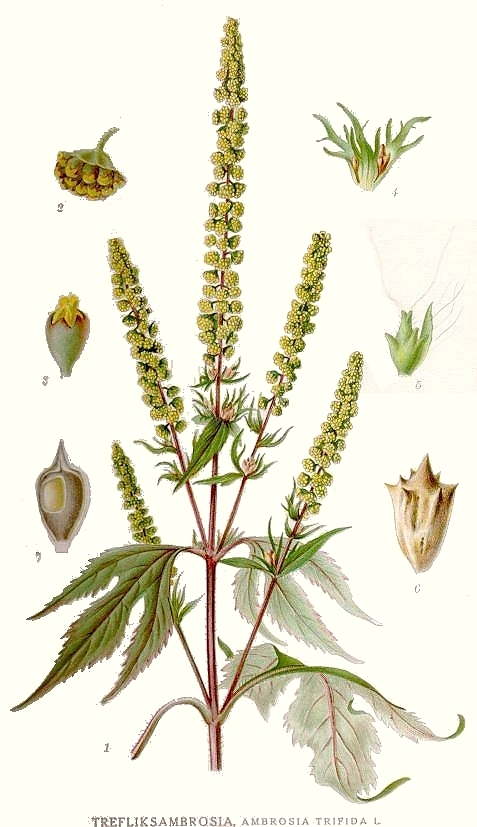
Botanical illustration of Ambrosia trifida

There are about 50 species in genus Ambrosia. Species include:

- Ambrosia acanthicarpa Hook. – flatspine bur ragweed, annual bursage, sand bursage
- Ambrosia acuminata (Brandegee) W.W.Payne
- Ambrosia ambrosioides (Cav.) W.W.Payne – ambrosia-leaf bur ragweed, big bursage, ambrosia bursage
- Ambrosia arborescens Mill. – marko, altamisa
- Ambrosia artemisiifolia L. – common ragweed, short ragweed, Roman wormwood
- Ambrosia artemisioides Meyen & Walp.
- Ambrosia bidentata Michx. – lanceleaf ragweed, southern ragweed
- Ambrosia bryantii (Curran) Payne
- Ambrosia camphorata (Greene) W.W.Payne
- Ambrosia canescens A.Gray – hairy ragweed
- Ambrosia carduacea (Greene) W.W.Payne
- Ambrosia chamissonis (Less.) Greene – silver burr ragweed, beach-bur
- Ambrosia cheiranthifolia A.Gray – Rio Grande ragweed, South Texas ambrosia
- Ambrosia chenopodiifolia (Benth.) W.W.Payne – San Diego bur ragweed, San Diego bursage
- Ambrosia confertiflora DC. – weakleaf bur ragweed
- Ambrosia cordifolia (A.Gray) W.W.Payne – Tucson bur ragweed, heartleaf bursage
- Ambrosia deltoidea (Torr.) W.W.Payne – triangle bur ragweed, triangle bursage
- Ambrosia dentata (Cabrera) M.O.Dillon
- Ambrosia divaricata (Brandegee) Payne
- Ambrosia diversifolia (Piper) Rydb.
- Ambrosia dumosa (A.Gray) W.W.Payne – burrobush, white bursage
- Ambrosia eriocentra (A.Gray) W.W.Payne – woolly fruit bur ragweed, hollyleaf bursage
- Ambrosia flexuosa (A.Gray) W.W.Payne
- Ambrosia grayi (A.Nelson) Shinners – woollyleaf bur ragweed, lagoonweed
- Ambrosia × helenae Rouleau – Helen ragweed
- Ambrosia hispida Pursh – coastal ragweed
- Ambrosia humi León de la Luz & Rebman
- Ambrosia ilicifolia (A.Gray) W.W.Payne – hollyleaf bur ragweed
- Ambrosia × intergradiens W.H.Wagner – intergrading ragweed
- Ambrosia johnstoniorum Henrickson
- Ambrosia linearis (Rydb.) W.W.Payne – streaked bur ragweed
- Ambrosia magdalenae (Brandegee) W.W.Payne
- Ambrosia maritima L.
- Ambrosia microcephala DC.
- Ambrosia monogyra (Torr. & A.Gray) Strother & B.G.Baldwin – singlewhorl burrobrush
- Ambrosia nivea (B.L.Rob. & Fernald) W.W.Payne
- Ambrosia pannosa W.W.Payne
- Ambrosia peruviana Willd. – ragweed, altamisa
- Ambrosia × platyspina (Seaman) Strother & B.G.Baldwin
- Ambrosia polystachya DC.
- Ambrosia psilostachya DC. – Cuman ragweed, western ragweed, perennial ragweed
- Ambrosia pumila (Nutt.) A.Gray – dwarf bur ragweed, San Diego ambrosia
- Ambrosia salsola (Torr. & A. Gray) Strother & B.G. Baldwin
- Ambrosia scabra Hook. & Arn.
- Ambrosia tacorensis Meyen
- Ambrosia tarapacana Phil.
- Ambrosia tenuifolia Spreng. – slimleaf bur ragweed, lacy ambrosia
- Ambrosia tomentosa Nutt. – skeletonleaf bur ragweed
- Ambrosia trifida L. – great ragweed, giant ragweed
- Ambrosia velutina O.E.Schulz
- Ambrosia villosissima Forssk.
