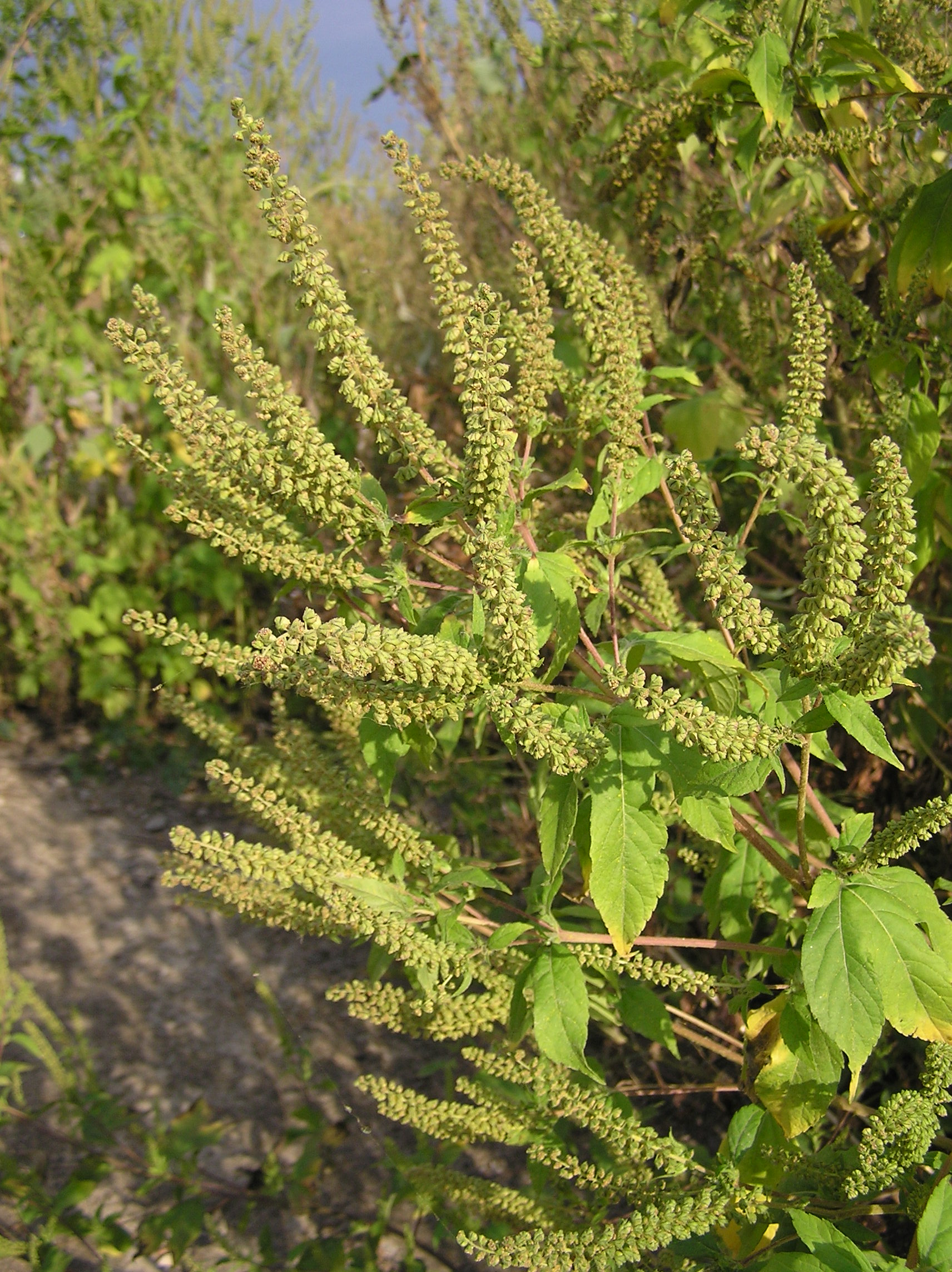

Conservation status
- Secure (NatureServe)

Scientific classification
- Kingdom: Plantae
- Clade: Tracheophytes
- Clade: Angiosperms
- Clade: Eudicots
- Clade: Asterids
- Order: Asterales
- Family: Asteraceae
- Tribe: Heliantheae
- Genus: Ambrosia
- Species: A. trifida

Binomial name
- Ambrosia trifida L. (1753)

Synonyms
- Ambrosia aptera DC.; Ambrosia integrifolia Muhl. ex Willd.

= Ambrosia trifida =

Species of flowering plant

Ambrosia trifida, the giant ragweed, is a species of flowering plant in the family Asteraceae. It is native to North America, where it is widespread in Canada, the United States, and northern Mexico.

== Distribution ==
It is present in Europe and Asia as an introduced species, and it is known as a common weed in many regions. Its common names include great ragweed, Texan great ragweed, giant ragweed, tall ragweed, blood ragweed, perennial ragweed, horseweed, buffaloweed, and kinghead.

== Description ==
This is an annual herb usually growing up to 2 m (6 ft 7 in) tall, but known to reach over 6 m (20 ft) in rich, moist soils. The tough stems have woody bases and are branching or unbranched. Most leaves are oppositely arranged. The blades are variable in shape, sometimes palmate with five lobes, and often with toothed edges. The largest can be over 25 cm (9.8 in) long by 20 cm (7.9 in) wide. They are borne on petioles several centimeters long. They are glandular and rough in texture. The species is monoecious, with plants bearing inflorescences containing both polyester and staminate flowers. The former are clustered at the base of the spike and the latter grow at the end. The fruit is a bur a few millimeters long tipped with several tiny spines.

== As a weed ==
This species is well known as a noxious weed, both in its native range and in areas where it is an introduced and often invasive species. It is naturalized in some areas, and it is recorded as an adventive species in others. It grows in many types of disturbed habitat, such as roadsides, and in cultivated fields. Widespread seed dispersal occurs when its spiny burs fall off the plant and are carried to new habitat by people, animals, machinery, or flowing water. The plant is destructive to native and crop plants because it easily outcompetes them for light.

Herbicide resistant giant ragweed populations were first identified in the late 1990s. Across much of the midwestern United States, populations resistant to group 2 (ALS-inhibitors) and group 9 (glyphosate) are present, though resistance to multiple herbicide modes of action has not yet been documented. There remains concern that herbicide resistance is more widespread than documented and many states like Minnesota offer free screening of giant ragweed for herbicide resistance For chemical control, use of group 4 (2-4D) and group 10 (glufosinate) are effective.

== As an allergen ==
Also, interest is great in preventing the spread of this plant because its pollen is a significant human allergen. It is one of the most allergenic ragweed species, and residents of different regions begin to experience allergic symptoms as the plant quickly spreads into the area.

== Uses ==
Native Americans had a number of uses for the plant as traditional medicine. The Cherokee used it as a remedy for insect stings, hives, fever, and pneumonia, and the Iroquois used it to treat diarrhea. The plant is suspected to have been domesticated by Native Americans as a oily seed crop as early as 1200BCE. This means it may have been a member of the Eastern Agricultural Complex.

Giant ragweed has been used successfully as a compost activator and an ingredient in sheet mulch gardens.

== Gallery ==
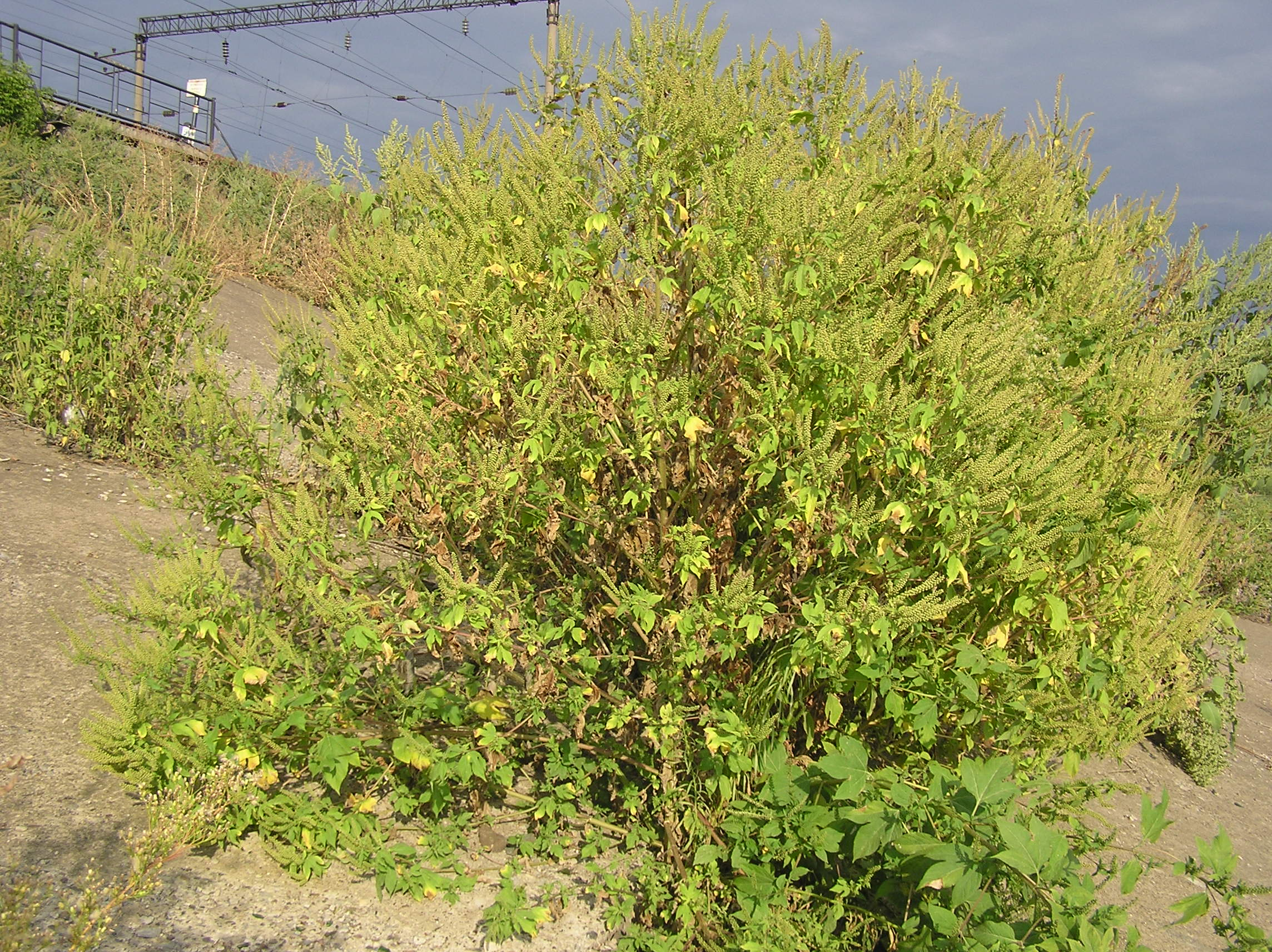
Habit

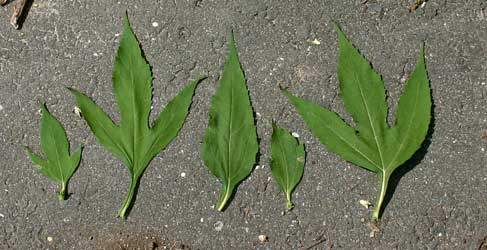
Leaves

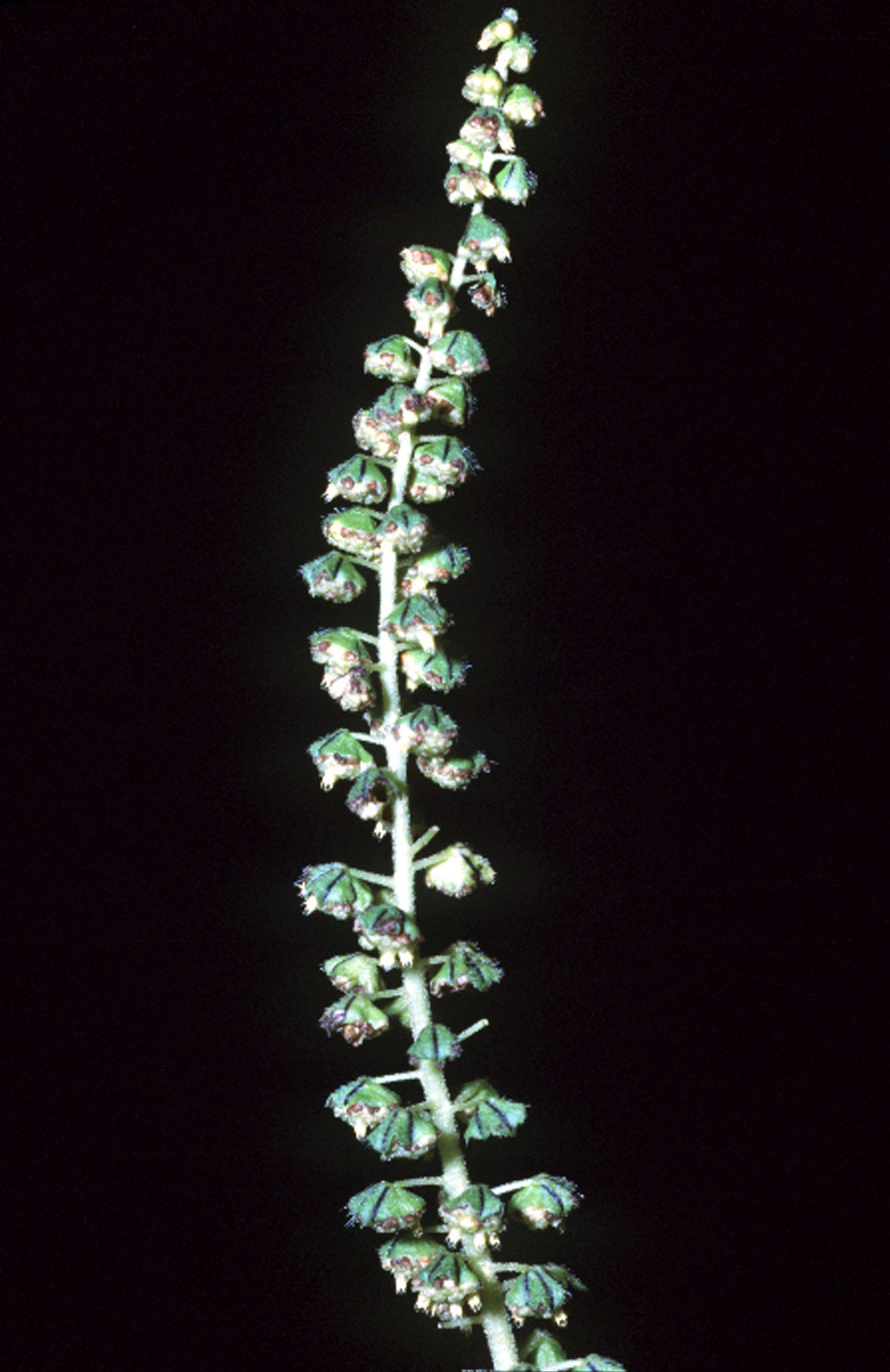
Inflorescence

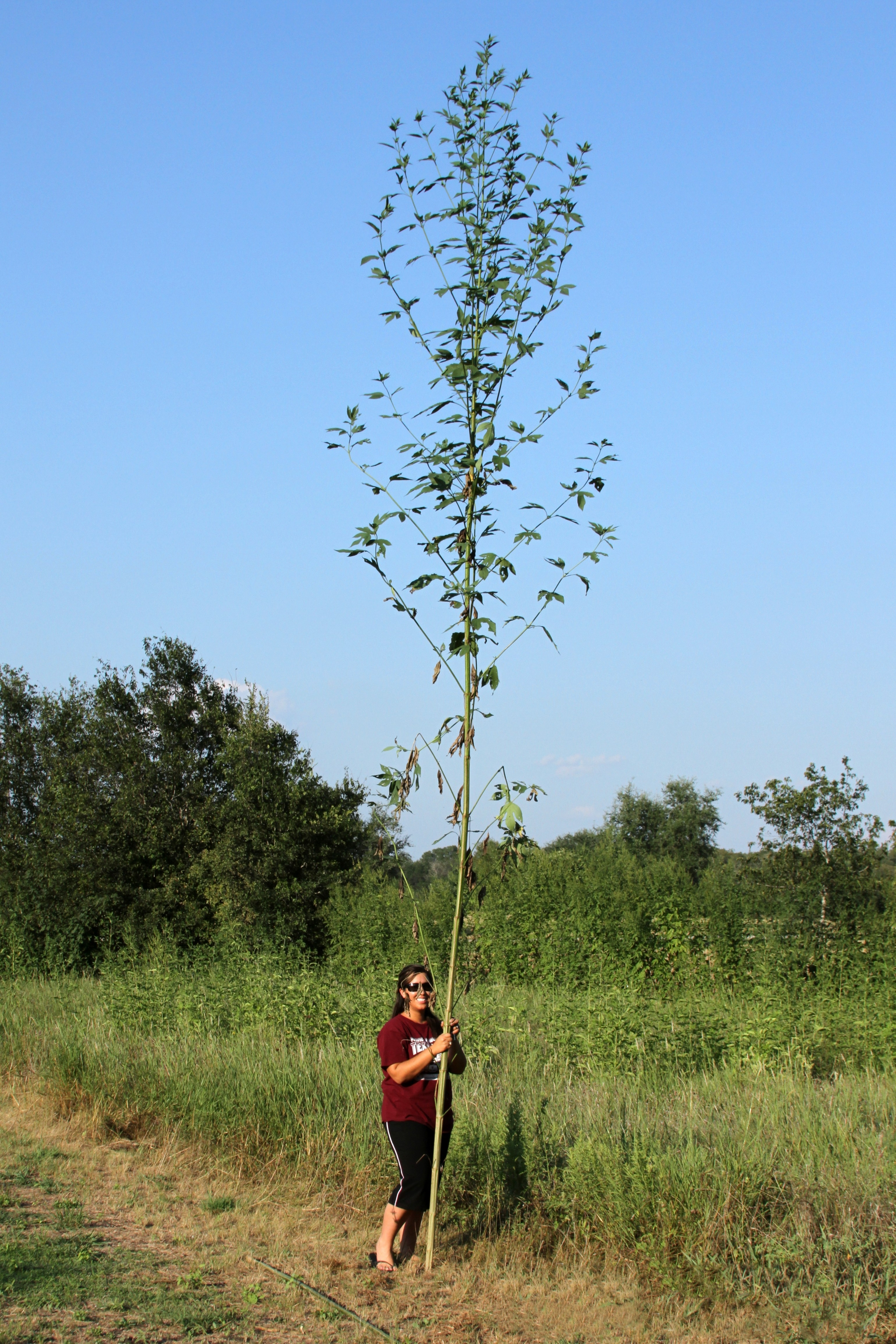
Tall specimen in Texas

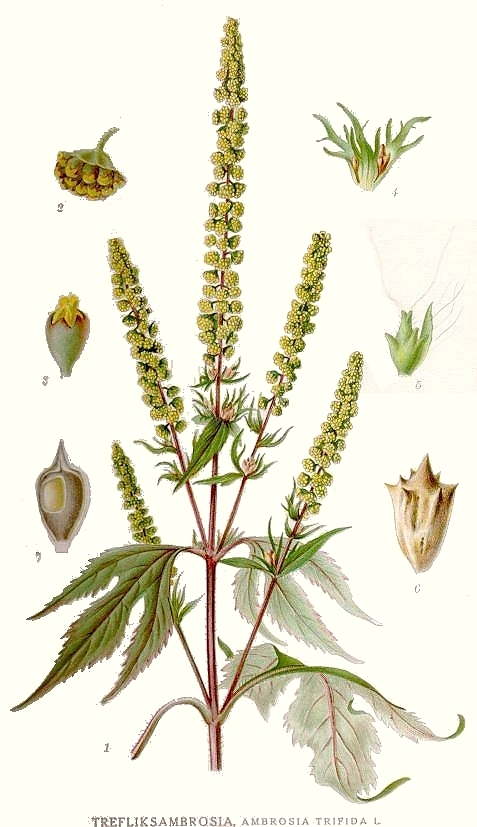
Illustration by Carl Axel Magnus Lindman
