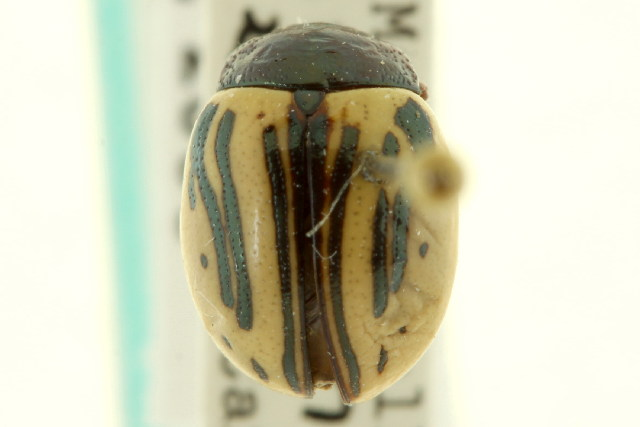

Scientific classification
- Kingdom: Animalia
- Phylum: Arthropoda
- Clade: Pancrustacea
- Class: Insecta
- Order: Coleoptera
- Suborder: Polyphaga
- Infraorder: Cucujiformia
- Family: Chrysomelidae
- Genus: Calligrapha
- Species: C. disrupta

Binomial name
- Calligrapha disrupta (Rogers, 1856)

= Calligrapha disrupta =

Species of beetle

Calligrapha disrupta is a species of leaf beetle belonging to the family Chrysomelidae, in the subgenus Zygogramma, which was formerly a genus.

== Description ==
C. disrupta is a small leaf beetle with a brown pronotum and yellow elytra marked with elongated brown stripes.

== Distribution and habitat ==
C. disrupta can be found in North America, and was introduced to Russia in the 1980s.

Adult beetles are associated with ragweed (Ambrosia), especially the species Ambrosia artemisiifolia and A. psilostachya.
