= Ragweed leaf beetle =

Ragweed leaf beetle may refer to either of two leaf beetles in the family Chrysomelidae:

- Ophraella communa
- Calligrapha suturalis, native to North America
