= Ophraella slobodkini =

Scientific classification
- Kingdom: Animalia
- Phylum: Arthropoda
- Clade: Pancrustacea
- Class: Insecta
- Order: Coleoptera
- Suborder: Polyphaga
- Infraorder: Cucujiformia
- Family: Chrysomelidae
- Genus: Ophraella
- Species: O. slobodkini

Binomial name
- Ophraella slobodkini Futuyma, 1991

Species of beetle

Ophraella slobodkini is a species of skeletonizing leaf beetle in the family Chrysomelidae. It is endemic to the Southeastern United States. Adult males measure on average 4.35 mm (0.17 in) and adult females 4.96 mm (0.20 in) in total length. It is associated with Ambrosia artemisiifolia.
