= Ragweed (disambiguation) =

Ragweeds are flowering plants in the genus Ambrosia in the aster family, Asteraceae.

Ragweed may also refer to:

- Bassia scoparia, a shrub native to Eurasia
- Jacobaea vulgaris, also known as ragwort
- Cross Canadian Ragweed, an alternative country band

== See also ==
- List of plants known as ragwort
- Ragweed leaf beetle, two beetles in the family Chrysomelidae
