= Wild tansy =

Wild tansy is a common name for several plants. Wild tansy may refer to:

- Ambrosia artemisiifolia, native to the Americas
- Tanacetum vulgare, native to Europe and Asia
