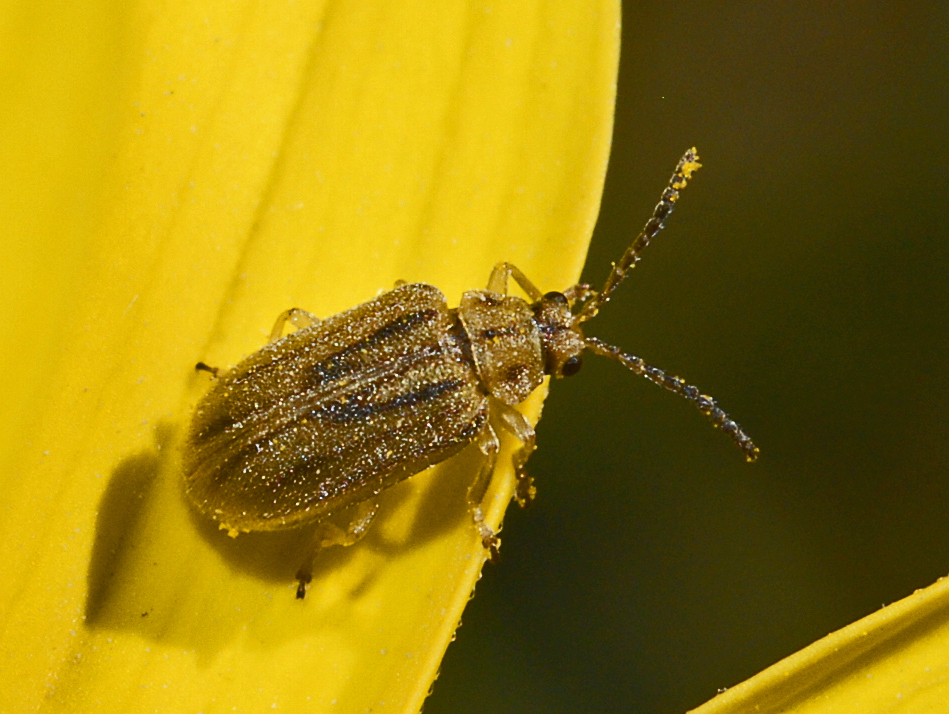
- Ophraella communa

Scientific classification
- Kingdom: Animalia
- Phylum: Arthropoda
- Clade: Pancrustacea
- Class: Insecta
- Order: Coleoptera
- Suborder: Polyphaga
- Infraorder: Cucujiformia
- Family: Chrysomelidae
- Subfamily: Galerucinae
- Tribe: Galerucini
- Genus: Ophraella; Wilcox, 1965

= Ophraella =

Genus of beetles

Ophraella is a genus of beetles belonging to the family Chrysomelidae.

== Species ==
Species within this genus include:

- Ophraella americana (Fabricius, 1801)
- Ophraella arctica LeSage, 1986
- Ophraella artemisiae Futuyma, 1990
- Ophraella bilineata (Kirby, 1837)
- Ophraella bivittata (Blatchley, 1920)
- Ophraella californiana LeSage, 1986
- Ophraella communa LeSage, 1986
- Ophraella conferta (LeConte, 1865)
- Ophraella cribrata (LeConte, 1865)
- Ophraella godmani (Jacoby, 1886)
- Ophraella integra (LeConte, 1865)
- Ophraella limonensis Bechyne, 1997
- Ophraella macrovittata LeSage, 1986
- Ophraella magdalia Bechyne, 1997
- Ophraella notata (Fabricius, 1801)
- Ophraella notulata (Fabricius, 1801)
- Ophraella nuda LeSage, 1986
- Ophraella pilosa LeSage, 1986
- Ophraella sexvittata (LeConte, 1865)
- Ophraella slobodkini Futuyma, 1991
