= Exaeretia gracilis =

Scientific classification
- Kingdom: Animalia
- Phylum: Arthropoda
- Clade: Pancrustacea
- Class: Insecta
- Order: Lepidoptera
- Family: Depressariidae
- Genus: Exaeretia
- Species: E. gracilis

Binomial name
- Exaeretia gracilis (Walsingham, 1889)

Synonyms
- Depressaria gracilis Walsingham, 1889; Martyrhilda gracilis; Depressariodes gracilis

Species of moth

Exaeretia gracilis is a moth in the family Depressariidae. It was described by Lord Walsingham in 1889. It is found in North America, where it has been recorded from North Dakota to Texas and in California, Colorado, Minnesota, Oklahoma, Wisconsin and Iowa.

The wingspan is 16–20 mm. The forewings are straw yellow with dark brown discal spots. There is a series of six or seven dark brown spots from the costa, just before the apex around termen. The hindwings are pale greyish fuscous.

The larvae feed on Ambrosia psilostachya.
