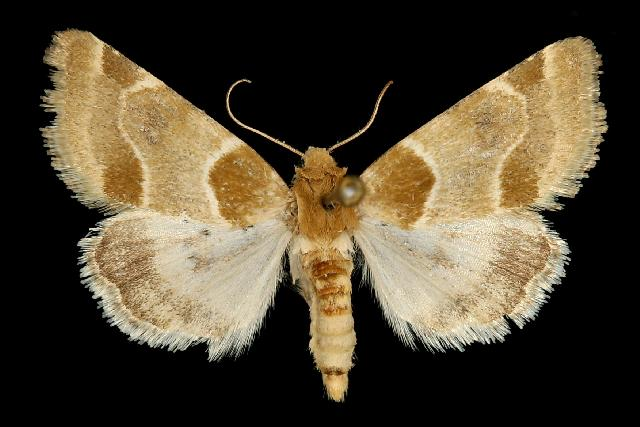

Scientific classification
- Domain: Eukaryota
- Kingdom: Animalia
- Phylum: Arthropoda
- Class: Insecta
- Order: Lepidoptera
- Superfamily: Noctuoidea
- Family: Noctuidae
- Genus: Schinia
- Species: S. sexplagiata

Binomial name
- Schinia sexplagiata Smith, 1891

= Schinia sexplagiata =

Species of moth

Schinia sexplagiata is a moth of the family Noctuidae. It is found in western North America, east up to west Texas.

The wingspan is about 21 mm.

The larvae feed on Ambrosia psilostachya.
