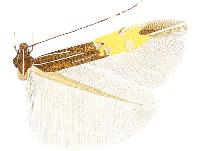

Scientific classification
- Domain: Eukaryota
- Kingdom: Animalia
- Phylum: Arthropoda
- Class: Insecta
- Order: Lepidoptera
- Family: Cosmopterigidae
- Genus: Cosmopterix
- Species: C. opulenta

Binomial name
- Cosmopterix opulenta Braun, 1919

= Cosmopterix opulenta =

Species of moth

Cosmopterix opulenta is a moth of the family Cosmopterigidae. It is known from the United States (California, Oklahoma, Arizona, New Mexico) and Costa Rica.

== Description ==
Male, female. Forewing length 3.3-3.6 mm. Head: frons shining ochreous-grey with greenish and reddish reflections, vertex and neck tufts shining bronze brown with reddish reflection, laterally and medially lined white, collar shining bronze brown; labial palpus first segment very short, white, second segment four-fifths of the length of third, shining dark brown with white longitudinal lines laterally and ventrally, third segment white, lined dark brown laterally; scape dark brown with white anterior and dorsal lines, antenna dark brown with a white line from base to beyond one-half, followed towards apex by five dark brown segments, six white, two dark brown, two white, two dark brown, two white, six dark brown and eight white segments at apex. Thorax and tegulae shining bronze brown with reddish gloss, thorax with a white median line, tegulae lined white inwardly. Legs: shining dark greyish brown, femora pale ochreous-grey, foreleg with a white line on tibia and tarsal segments one to three and four in apical half, segment five entirely white, tibia of midleg with white oblique basal and medial streaks and a white apical ring, tarsal segments one to three and five with white apical rings, tibia of hindleg with a long and oblique white line on outside from base to four-fifths, followed by a white subapical ring, tarsal segment one with a white basal ring and dorsally white in the apical half, segments two to five dorsally white, spurs white dorsally, dark brownish grey ventrally. Forewing shining bronze brown with reddish gloss, five white lines in the basal area, a costal from one-quarter to the transverse fascia, a subcostal from base to one-quarter, slightly bending from costa, a medial from beyond base to two-fifths, a subdorsal from one-quarter almost to the transverse fascia, an indistinct dorsal from beyond base to one-quarter, a pale yellow transverse fascia beyond the middle and with an irregular basal protrusion in middle and with a broad, distally narrowed, prolongation towards apex, bordered at the inner edge by two subcostal and a subdorsal tubercular silver metallic spots, the subdorsal spot slightly further from base than the subcostal, the subcostal with a patch of blackish scales on the outside, at two-thirds of the transverse fascia are two tubercular silver metallic costal and dorsal spots, almost opposite, the dorsal spot about three times as large as the costal, the costal spot with some bronze brown inward lining, a white costal streak from the outer costal spot, a broad white apical line from the prolongation of transverse fascia to apex, cilia pale yellow from the white costal streak to the costal end of the transverse fascia, changing into bronze brown around apex, paler towards dorsum. Hindwing shining pale brownish grey, cilia greyish brown. Underside: forewing shining greyish brown, the yellow section in the costal cilia and the white apical line distinctly visible, hindwing shining brownish grey.

== Biology ==
The larvae feed on Ambrosia psilostachya and Artemisia douglasiana. They mine the leaves of their host plant. The mines extend principally along the midrib, with irregular projections branching out on either side. The larva spins a cocoon on the densely pubescent underside of the leaf, constructed of silk, and the whitish pubescence of the leaf. Mines have been collected in October, while adults appeared in April of the following year. Adults have also been collected from June to July and September to October. There are two generations per year.
