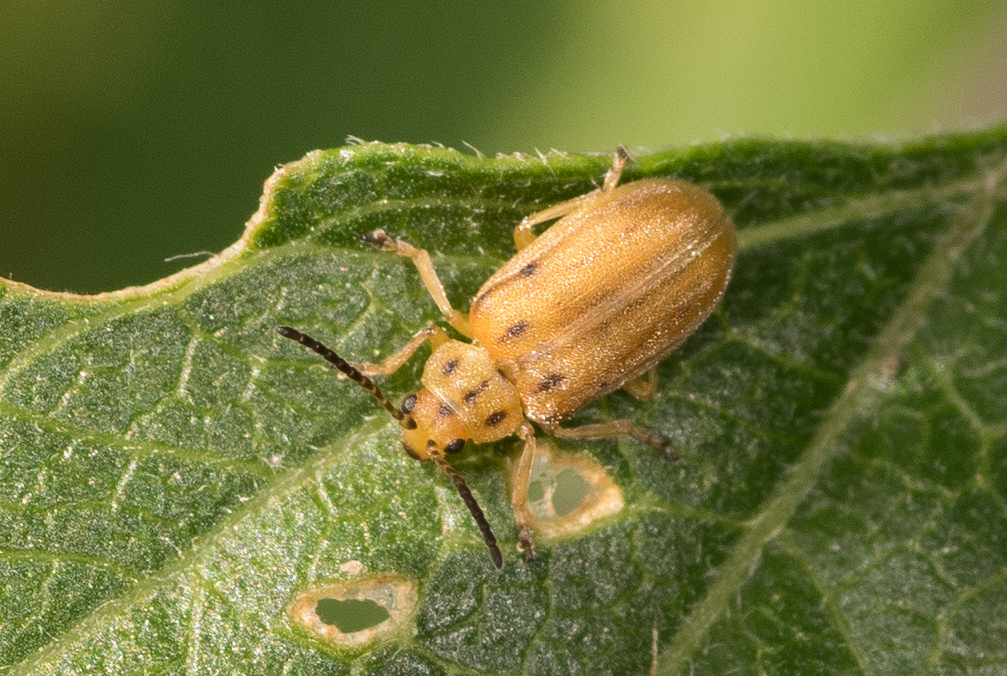

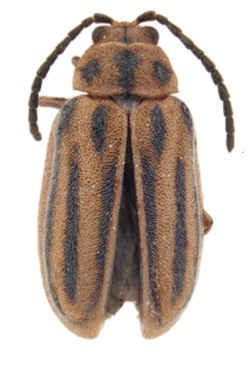

Scientific classification
- Kingdom: Animalia
- Phylum: Arthropoda
- Clade: Pancrustacea
- Class: Insecta
- Order: Coleoptera
- Suborder: Polyphaga
- Infraorder: Cucujiformia
- Family: Chrysomelidae
- Genus: Ophraella
- Species: O. notata

Binomial name
- Ophraella notata (Fabricius, 1801)

Synonyms
- Galleruca notata Fabricius, 1801

= Ophraella notata =

Species of beetle

Ophraella notata is a species of skeletonizing leaf beetle in the family Chrysomelidae. It is found from New Mexico to Florida, north to New Brunswick and Wyoming.

== Biology ==
It feeds on Eupatorium perfoliatum.
