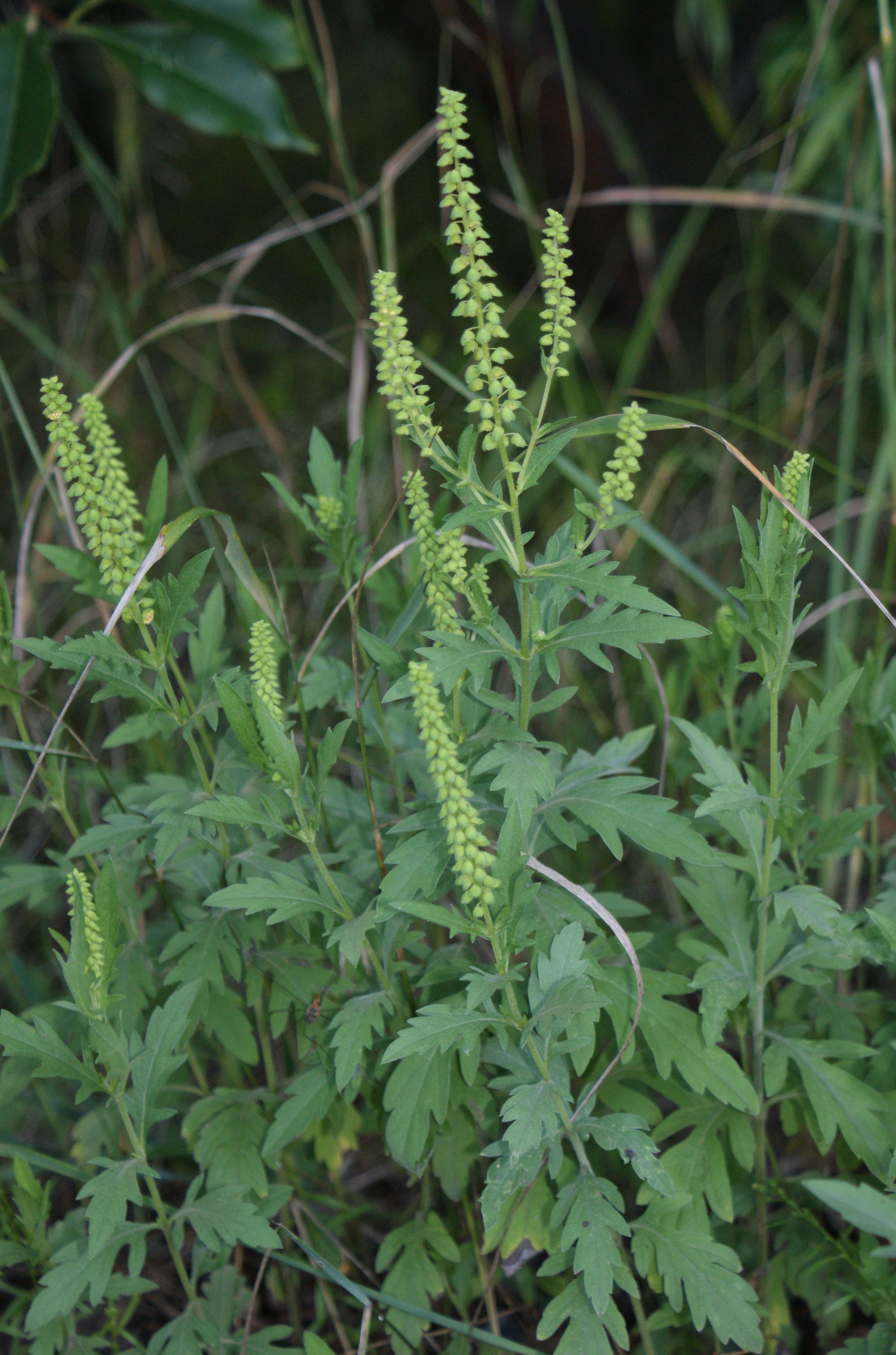

Conservation status
- Secure (NatureServe)

Scientific classification
- Kingdom: Plantae
- Clade: Tracheophytes
- Clade: Angiosperms
- Clade: Eudicots
- Clade: Asterids
- Order: Asterales
- Family: Asteraceae
- Tribe: Heliantheae
- Genus: Ambrosia
- Species: A. psilostachya

Binomial name
- Ambrosia psilostachya DC.

Synonyms
- Ambrosia californica Rydb.; Ambrosia coronopifolia Torr. & A.Gray; Ambrosia hispida Torr.; Ambrosia lindheimeriana Scheele; Ambrosia peruviana DC. 1836 not All. 1773 nor Willd. 1805; Ambrosia rugelii Rydb.

= Ambrosia psilostachya =

Species of flowering plant in the daisy family

Ambrosia psilostachya is a species of ragweed known by the common names Cuman ragweed and perennial ragweed, and western ragweed.

== Distribution and habitat ==
The plant is widespread across much of North America (United States, Canada, and northern Mexico). It is also naturalized in parts of Europe, Asia, Australia, and South America. It is a common plant in many habitat types, including disturbed areas such as roadsides.

== Description ==
Ambrosia psilostachya is an erect perennial herb growing a slender, branching, straw-colored stem to a maximum height near two meters, but more often remaining under one meter tall. Leaves are up to 12 centimeters long and vary in shape from lance-shaped to nearly oval, and they are divided into many narrow, pointed lobes. The stem and leaves are hairy.

The top of the stem is occupied by an inflorescence which is usually a spike. The species is monoecious, and the inflorescence is composed of staminate (male) flower heads with the pistillate heads located below and in the axils of leaves. This bloom period is from June through November.

The pistillate heads yield fruits which are achenes located within oval-shaped greenish-brown burs about half a centimeter long. The burs are hairy and sometimes spiny. The plant reproduces by seed and by sprouting up from a creeping rhizome-like root system.

== Ecology ==
Ambrosia psilostachya is a host plant for the caterpillars of Bucculatrix transversata, Cosmopterix opulenta, Exaeretia gracilis, Gnorimoschema saphirinella, Schinia sexplagiata; the beetles Calligrapha disrupta, Calligrapha suturalis; and the grasshopper Spharagemon collare.

== Medicinal uses ==
This plant had a number of medicinal uses among several different Native American tribes, including the Cheyenne, Kumeyaay (Diegueno), and Kiowa people.

== Chemistry ==
Ambrosia psilostachya contains a group of phytochemicals called psilostachyins.
