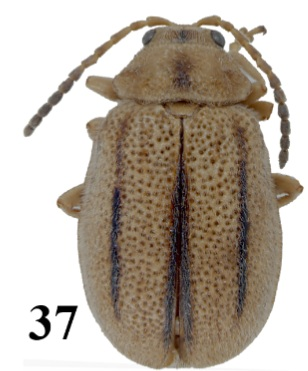

Scientific classification
- Kingdom: Animalia
- Phylum: Arthropoda
- Clade: Pancrustacea
- Class: Insecta
- Order: Coleoptera
- Suborder: Polyphaga
- Infraorder: Cucujiformia
- Family: Chrysomelidae
- Genus: Ophraella
- Species: O. americana

Binomial name
- Ophraella americana (Fabricius, 1801)

Synonyms
- Galleruca americana Fabricius, 1801

= Ophraella americana =

Species of beetle

Ophraella americana, the American goldenrod leaf beetle, is a species of skeletonizing leaf beetle in the family Chrysomelidae. It is found in North America, where it has been recorded from Arizona to Florida, north to Quebec and Alberta.

== Biology ==
It has been recorded feeding on Solidago species.
