= List of plants known as ragwort =

Ragwort may refer to a number of plant species:

- Certain members of the genus Senecio (ragworts and groundsels) including:
  - Senecio ampullaceus, Texas ragwort
  - Senecio cambrensis, Welsh ragwort
  - Senecio squalidus, Oxford ragwort
  - Senecio viscosus, sticky ragwort
- Certain members of the genus Jacobaea (a segregate of Senecio):
  - Jacobaea vulgaris, (common) ragwort or, only in the USA tansy ragwort, a very common wild flower in Europe, widely naturalised elsewhere
  - Jacobaea aquatica, water ragwort, marsh ragwort
  - Jacobaea erucifolia, Hoary ragwort
- Certain members of the genus Packera including:
  - Packera obovata, Roundleaf ragwort
  - Packera aurea, golden ragwort
- Certain member of the genus Pericallis including:
  - Pericallis × hybrida, common ragwort
- Certain members of the genus Rugelia including:
  - Rugelia nudicaulis, Rugels ragwort, a wildflower found only in the Great Smoky Mountains

== See also ==
- Ragweed (disambiguation)
