= Ophraella californiana =

Scientific classification
- Kingdom: Animalia
- Phylum: Arthropoda
- Clade: Pancrustacea
- Class: Insecta
- Order: Coleoptera
- Suborder: Polyphaga
- Infraorder: Cucujiformia
- Family: Chrysomelidae
- Genus: Ophraella
- Species: O. californiana

Binomial name
- Ophraella californiana LeSage, 1986

Species of beetle

Ophraella californiana is a species of skeletonizing leaf beetle in the family Chrysomelidae. It is found in North America.
