= Gnorimoschema saphirinella =

Scientific classification
- Kingdom: Animalia
- Phylum: Arthropoda
- Clade: Pancrustacea
- Class: Insecta
- Order: Lepidoptera
- Family: Gelechiidae
- Genus: Gnorimoschema
- Species: G. saphirinella

Binomial name
- Gnorimoschema saphirinella (Chambers, 1875)

Synonyms
- Gelechia saphirinella Chambers, 1875

Species of moth

Gnorimoschema saphirinella is a moth in the family Gelechiidae. It was described by Vactor Tousey Chambers in 1875. It is widespread throughout North America, where it has been recorded from Alabama, Arizona, California, Colorado, Florida, Georgia, Illinois, Kansas, Mississippi, New Mexico, North Dakota, Oklahoma, Tennessee and Texas.

The length of the forewings is 4.5–6 mm for males and 4.2-5.9 mm for females. Adults are on wing from February to October.

The larvae feed on Ambrosia chamissonis, Ambrosia confertifolia and Ambrosia psilostachya. They mine the leaves of their host plants.
