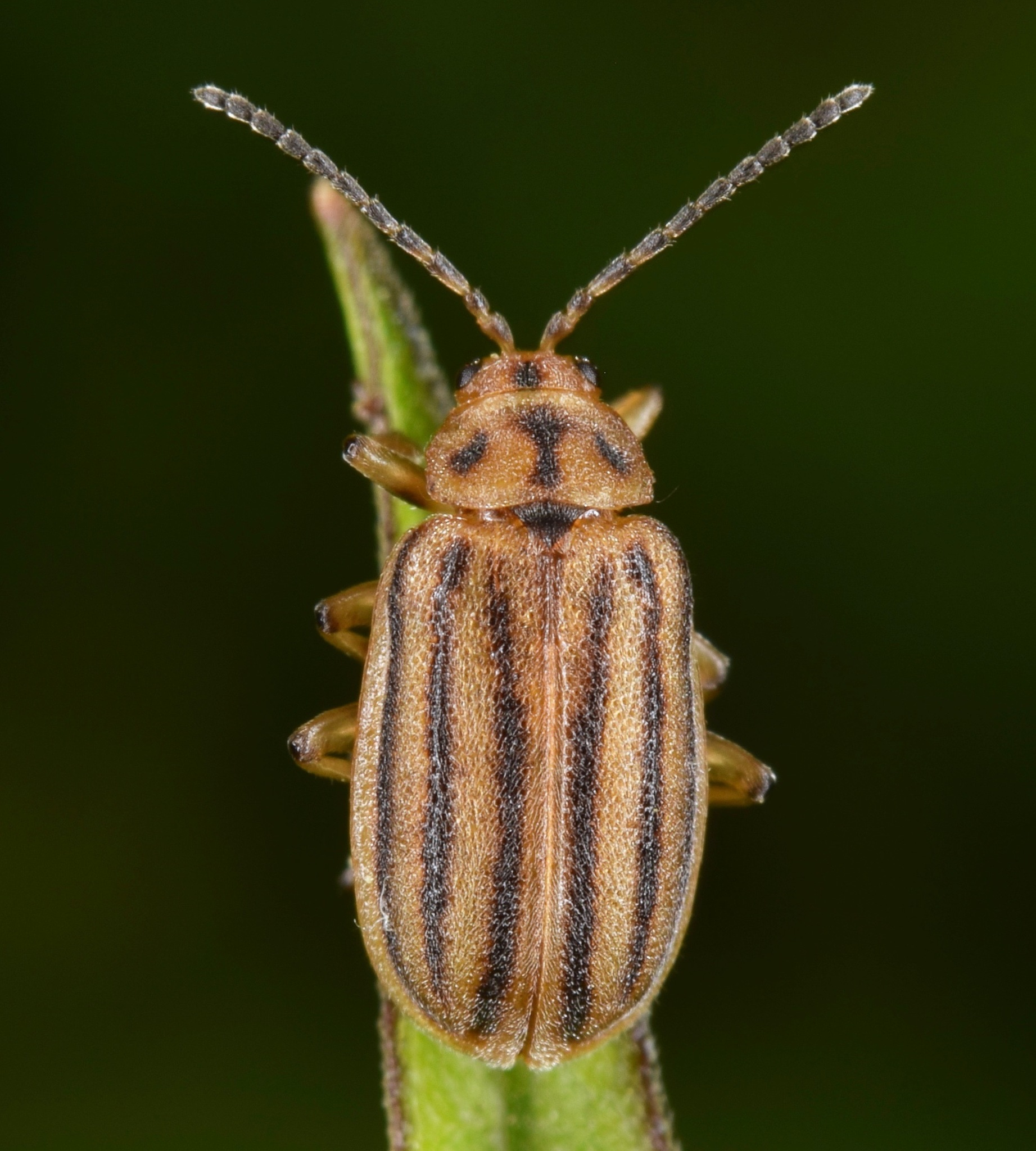

Scientific classification
- Kingdom: Animalia
- Phylum: Arthropoda
- Clade: Pancrustacea
- Class: Insecta
- Order: Coleoptera
- Suborder: Polyphaga
- Infraorder: Cucujiformia
- Family: Chrysomelidae
- Genus: Ophraella
- Species: O. sexvittata

Binomial name
- Ophraella sexvittata (J. L. LeConte, 1865)

= Ophraella sexvittata =

Species of beetle

Ophraella sexvittata is a species of skeletonizing leaf beetle in the family Chrysomelidae. It is found in North America.
