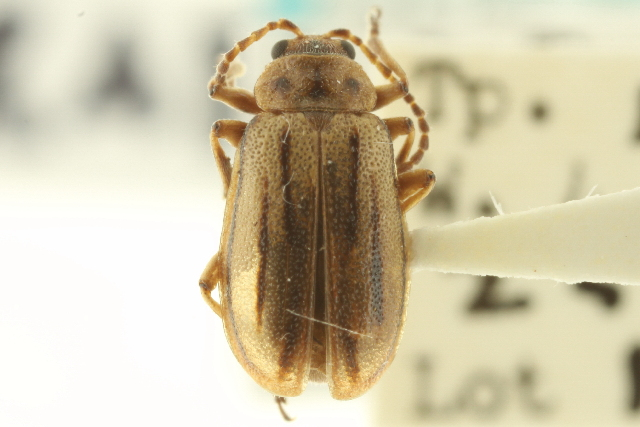

Scientific classification
- Kingdom: Animalia
- Phylum: Arthropoda
- Clade: Pancrustacea
- Class: Insecta
- Order: Coleoptera
- Suborder: Polyphaga
- Infraorder: Cucujiformia
- Family: Chrysomelidae
- Genus: Ophraella
- Species: O. nuda

Binomial name
- Ophraella nuda LeSage, 1986

= Ophraella nuda =

Species of beetle

Ophraella nuda, the naked flea beetle, is a species of skeletonizing leaf beetle in the family Chrysomelidae.

== Details ==
It is endemic to the prairies of southern Alberta. Its host plant is povertyweed, a common plant in shortgrass prairies. It is paraphyletic with Ophraella artemisiae which it differs little from genetically despite being dissimilar morphologically, this is a result of peripatric speciation. Both the holotype and the allotype of naked flea beetle were collected in 1955 near the locality of Comrey, next to the Milk River Valley. Other specimens come from Hilda, Medicine Hat, Onefour, and Waterton. Specimens from Upstate New York are thought to have been mislabelled.

== Description ==
Ophraella nuda is a yellow-brown coloured flea beetle with four vertical lines on its elytra and three brown spots on its pronotum. Females are larger than males, with males being 3.4-4.6 mm long and 1.8-2.2 mm wide and females being 3.9-4.8 mm long and 2-2.4 mm wide. The feature that distinguishes O. nuda from all other similar species is that the elytra looks extremely glabrous, unlike the visibly haired elytras of O. communa and O. arctica. The elytra however does actually have short, fine, transparent hair which is only visible at higher magnifications.
