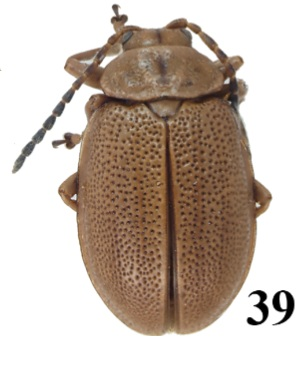

Scientific classification
- Kingdom: Animalia
- Phylum: Arthropoda
- Clade: Pancrustacea
- Class: Insecta
- Order: Coleoptera
- Suborder: Polyphaga
- Infraorder: Cucujiformia
- Family: Chrysomelidae
- Genus: Ophraella
- Species: O. cribrata

Binomial name
- Ophraella cribrata (J. L. LeConte, 1865)

Synonyms
- Galeruca cribrata LeConte, 1865

= Ophraella cribrata =

Species of beetle

Ophraella cribrata is a species of skeletonizing leaf beetle in the family Chrysomelidae. It is found from Canada (Alberta, Saskatchewan, Manitoba and Ontario) south to Georgia and Colorado.

== Biology ==
It has been recorded feeding on Solidago species.
