= Ophraella bilineata =

Scientific classification
- Kingdom: Animalia
- Phylum: Arthropoda
- Clade: Pancrustacea
- Class: Insecta
- Order: Coleoptera
- Suborder: Polyphaga
- Infraorder: Cucujiformia
- Family: Chrysomelidae
- Genus: Ophraella
- Species: O. bilineata

Binomial name
- Ophraella bilineata (Kirby, 1837)

Species of beetle

Ophraella bilineata is a species of skeletonizing leaf beetle in the family Chrysomelidae. It is found in North America.
