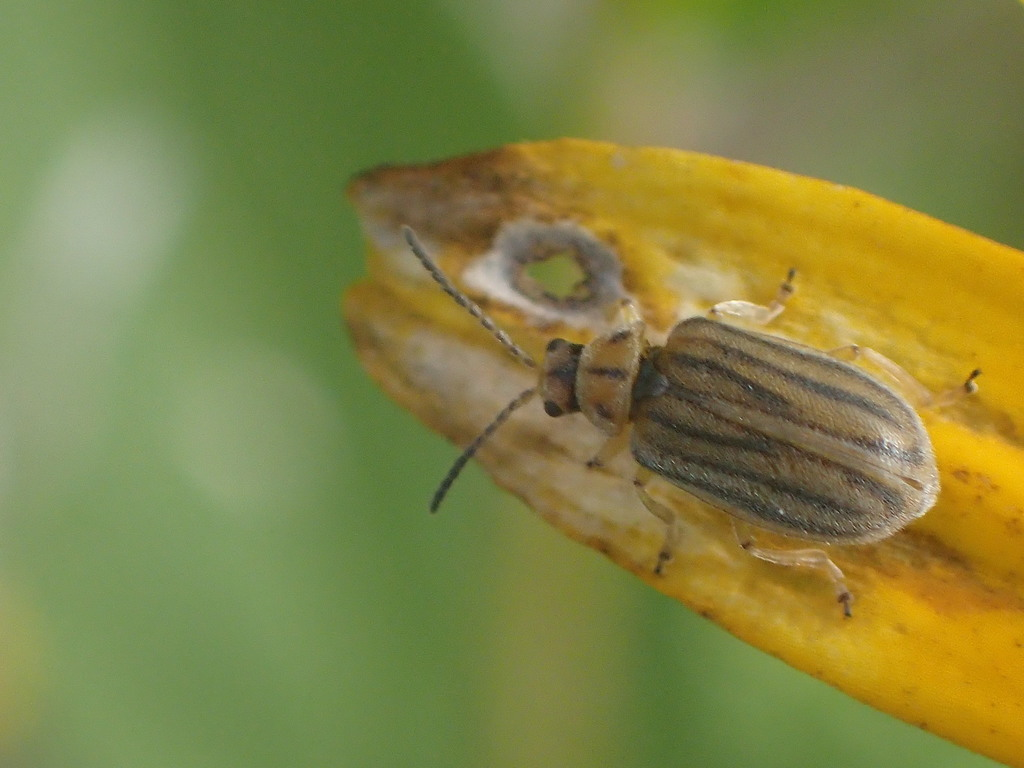

Scientific classification
- Kingdom: Animalia
- Phylum: Arthropoda
- Clade: Pancrustacea
- Class: Insecta
- Order: Coleoptera
- Suborder: Polyphaga
- Infraorder: Cucujiformia
- Family: Chrysomelidae
- Genus: Ophraella
- Species: O. notulata

Binomial name
- Ophraella notulata (Fabricius, 1801)

= Ophraella notulata =

Species of beetle

Ophraella notulata is a species of skeletonizing leaf beetle in the family Chrysomelidae. It is found in Central America and North America.
