= Bucculatrix transversata =

Scientific classification
- Kingdom: Animalia
- Phylum: Arthropoda
- Clade: Pancrustacea
- Class: Insecta
- Order: Lepidoptera
- Family: Bucculatricidae
- Genus: Bucculatrix
- Species: B. transversata

Binomial name
- Bucculatrix transversata Braun, 1910

Species of moth

Bucculatrix transversata is a moth in the family Bucculatricidae. It is found in North America, where it has been recorded from California. The species was first described in 1910 by Annette Frances Braun.

The wingspan is about 7 mm. The hindwings are grey. Adults have been recorded on wing in July.

The larvae feed on Ambrosia psilostachya. The larvae can be found in October. Pupation takes place at the end of October.
