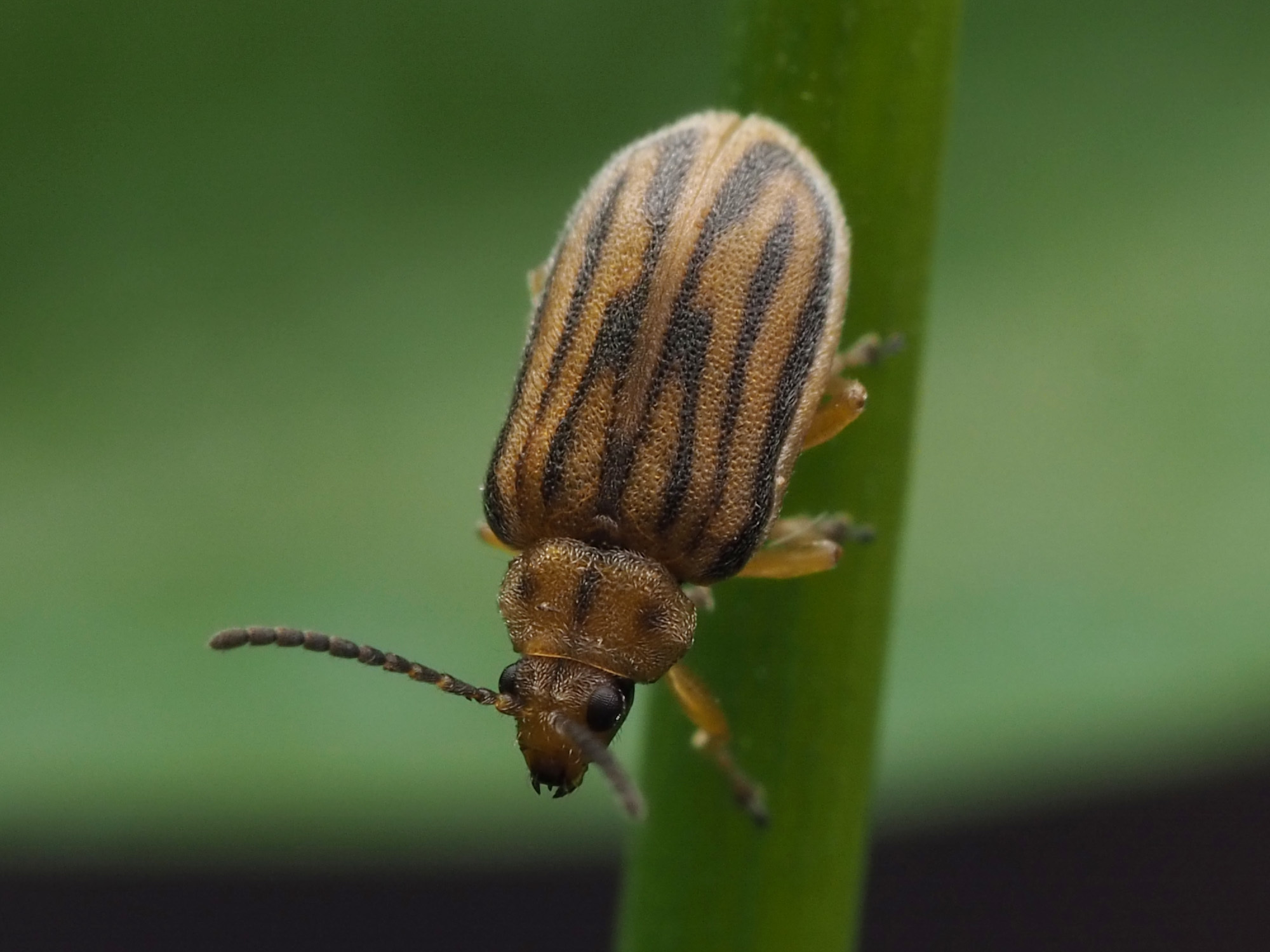
- Ophraella communa in Pennsylvania

Scientific classification
- Kingdom: Animalia
- Phylum: Arthropoda
- Clade: Pancrustacea
- Class: Insecta
- Order: Coleoptera
- Suborder: Polyphaga
- Infraorder: Cucujiformia
- Family: Chrysomelidae
- Subfamily: Galerucinae
- Tribe: Galerucini
- Genus: Ophraella
- Species: O. communa

Binomial name
- Ophraella communa LeSage, 1986

= Ophraella communa =

Species of beetle

Ophraella communa, common name ragweed leaf beetle, is a species of beetles belonging to the family Chrysomelidae.

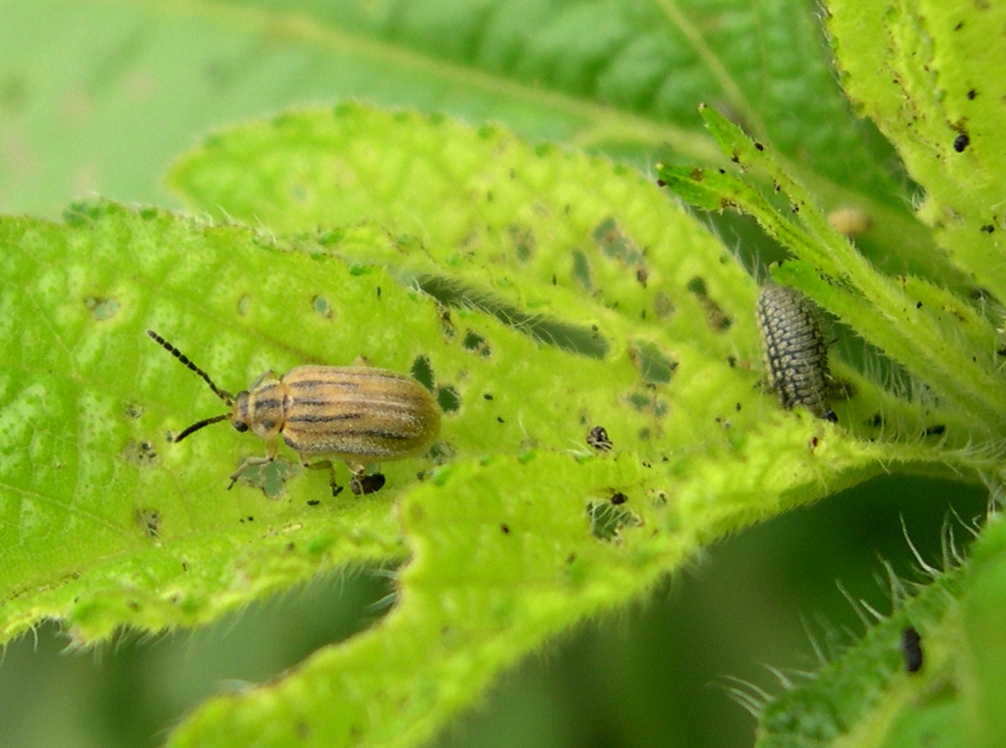
Imago and larva of Ophraella communa on leaves of Ambrosia artemisiifolia

== Distribution ==
This species is native to North America (Canada, United States and Mexico) and it has been introduced in Asia and Europe, where it arrived in 2013.

== Description ==
Ophraella communa can reach a length of 3.4–4.1 millimetres (0.13–0.16 in) in males, of 3.9–4.3 millimetres (0.15–0.17 in) in females. The head is yellowish, with dark brown spots at the back. Body is coarsely punctured. Antennae are dark brown. Pronotum is yellowish or pale brown, with three black or dark brown spots. Elytra are yellowish or pale brown and show dark brown longitudinal stripes.

== Biology ==
This species feeds almost exclusively (oligophagy) on leaves and flowers of the family Asteraceae, tribe Heliantheae, e.g. sunflowers (Helianthus annuus) and rough cockleburs (Xanthium strumarium), with a marked predilection for common ragweed (Ambrosia artemisiifolia), which is invasive in Europe and Asia.

The eggs are laid on the underside of young leaves of the host plants. The eggs are pear-shaped, with an hexagonal microsculpture. They are at first yellow, but quickly change their color to orange. Before the pupation, the beetles form cocoons on a leaf tip. Pupation lasts one to two weeks. After hatching, the adults remain on their host plants, but later they can migrate up to 25 km within one day.
