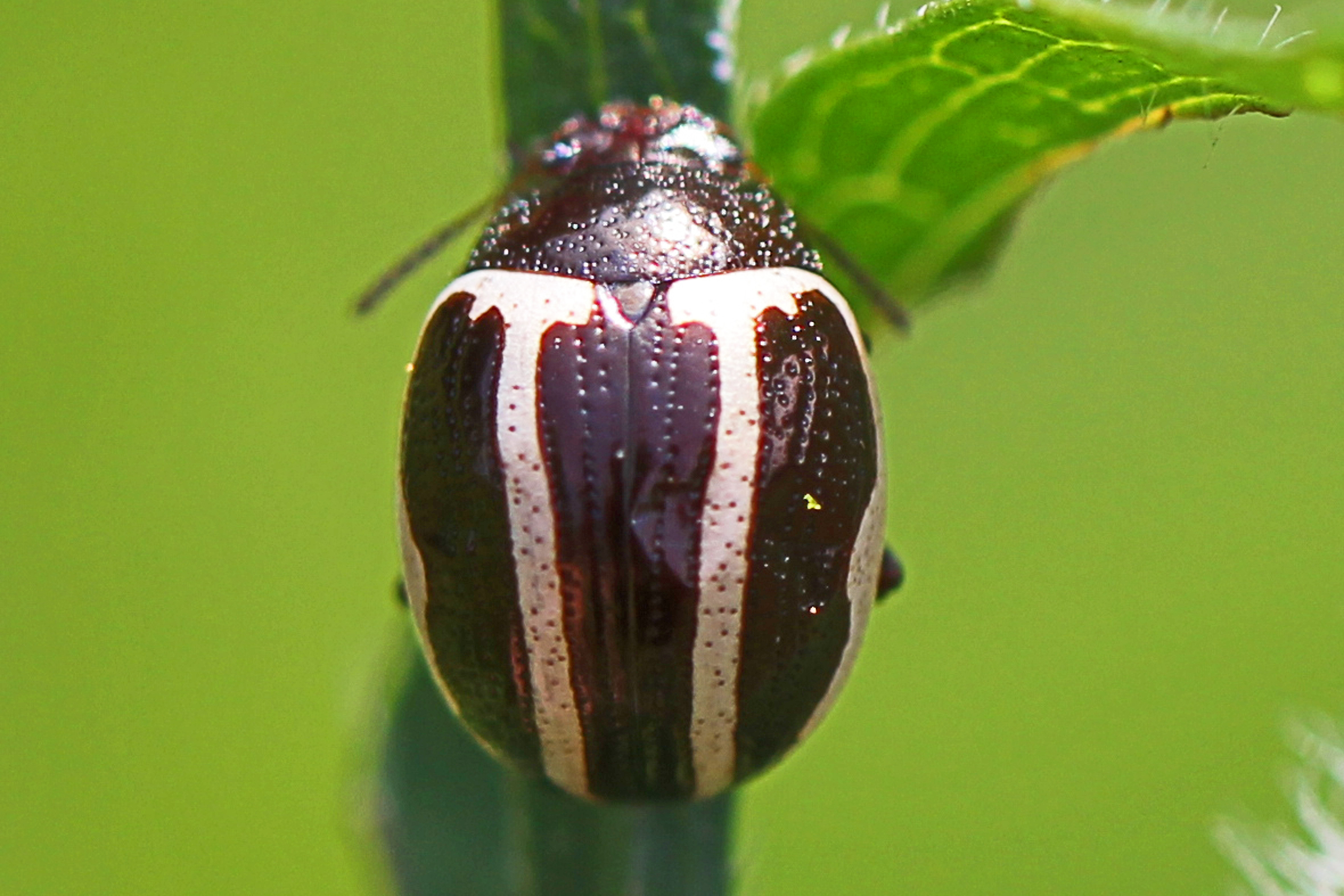

Scientific classification
- Kingdom: Animalia
- Phylum: Arthropoda
- Clade: Pancrustacea
- Class: Insecta
- Order: Coleoptera
- Suborder: Polyphaga
- Infraorder: Cucujiformia
- Family: Chrysomelidae
- Subfamily: Chrysomelinae
- Tribe: Chrysomelini
- Genus: Calligrapha
- Species: C. suturalis

Binomial name
- Calligrapha suturalis (Fabricius, 1775)

= Calligrapha suturalis =

Species of beetle

Calligrapha suturalis, commonly known as the ragweed leaf beetle, is a species of leaf beetle belonging to the family Chrysomelidae, in the subgenus Zygogramma, which was formerly a genus. Native to North America, it has been introduced into Russia and China for the biological pest control of ragweed.

== Description ==
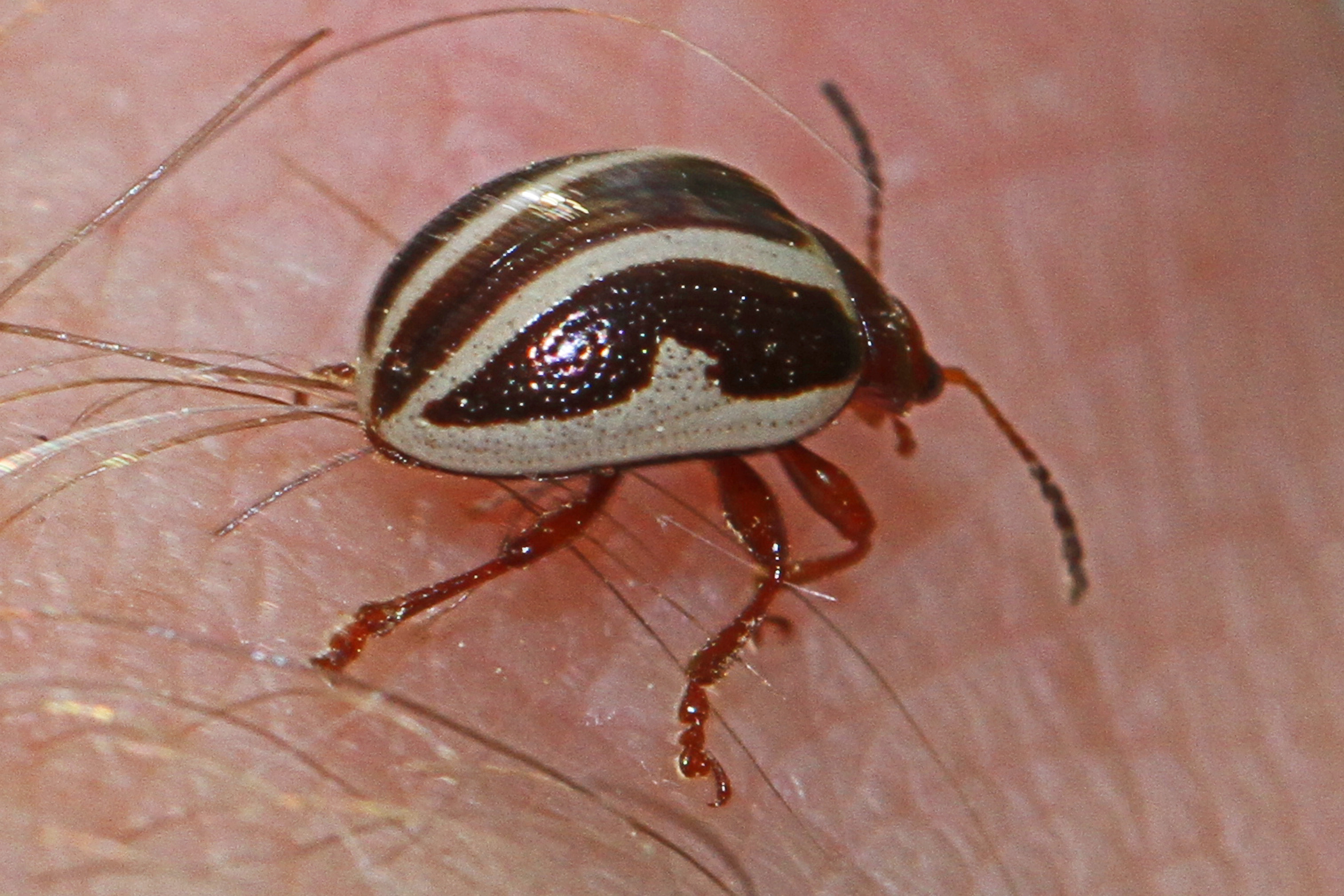
Ragweed leaf beetle

This leaf beetle is small with a brown head and pronotum, and yellow elytra marked with two wide margins of brown on each wing; one in the middle and one at the suture.

== Distribution ==
C. suturalis is native to Canada and the USA.

It was introduced into Russia in 1978 in an attempt to control invasive Ambrosia artemisiifolia (common ragweed). About 1500 individuals were originally released, eliminating ragweed at the experimental control site by 1983. The success of C. suturalis in Russia led to a population explosion with densities of up to 100,000,000 adults per square kilometre recorded subsequently.

It was introduced to China as a biological pest control for ragweed in 1987.

== Life cycle and habitat ==
Adults and larvae feed on Ambrosia artemisiifolia (common ragweed), A. psilostachya, and A. trifida.

Overwintering adults began feeding in late April or early May of the following year, having emerged when ragweed seedlings were only 2–5 cm tall. Larvae of the first or spring generation began feeding in mid-May or early June and most reached maturity by early July. Larvae of the second or late summer generation were evident during the first two weeks of August.

No complex courtship behavioural patterns have been observed in C. suturalis; copulation most commonly takes place during the late morning or early evening and lasts from a few minutes to well over an hour. Females lay between 145 and 563 eggs, over a period of 22–42 days. Eggs are deposited in clusters of two or three on the underside of young ragweed leaves, usually near the leaf tip.

Investigations in the USA showed that C. suturalis had 2 generations a year, but field investigations in China have shown that the beetle species could have up to 3 generations a year in that populations. At 26±1 °C, the average lifespan of the adult female and male was 82.5 and 67.8 days respectively. The mated females began laying eggs two weeks after emergence. Each female lays an average of 394 eggs.
