= Psilostachyin =

- Psilostachyin A

- Psilostachyin B

- Psilostachyin C

Identifiers
CAS Number	A: 3533-47-9; B: 6995-02-4; C: 6466-67-7
3D model (JSmol)	A: Interactive image; B: Interactive image; C: Interactive image
ChEMBL	A: ChEMBL270060
ChemSpider	A: 4478755; B: 4478756; C: 4478757
PubChem CID	A: 5320767; B: 5320768; C: 5320769
- InChI: A: InChI=1S/C15H20O5/c1-8-4-5-10-9(2)13(17)19-12(10)14(3,18)15(8)7-6-11(16)20-15/h8,10,12,18H,2,4-7H2,1,3H3/t8-,10-,12+,14-,15+/m0/s1 Key: IRPFOXRBPHCCTG-JISBIHODSA-N; B: InChI=1S/C15H18O4/c1-8-4-5-10-9(2)14(17)18-13(10)15(3)11(8)6-7-12(16)19-15/h10,13H,2,4-7H2,1,3H3/t10-,13+,15+/m0/s1 Key: IOGFBFUSBVLQMS-PSOPSSQASA-N; C: InChI=1S/C15H20O4/c1-8-4-5-10-9(2)14(17)18-13(10)15(3)11(8)6-7-12(16)19-15/h8,10-11,13H,2,4-7H2,1,3H3/t8-,10-,11-,13+,15+/m0/s1 Key: FZYIWDQVFMUXPW-OEAYZANCSA-N
- SMILES: A: C[C@H]1CC[C@@H]2[C@H]([C@]([C@@]13CCC(=O)O3)(C)O)OC(=O)C2=C; B: CC1=C2CCC(=O)O[C@]2([C@H]3[C@@H](CC1)C(=C)C(=O)O3)C; C: C[C@H]1CC[C@@H]2[C@H]([C@]3([C@H]1CCC(=O)O3)C)OC(=O)C2=C
- Except where otherwise noted, data are given for materials in their standard state (at 25 °C [77 °F], 100 kPa). Infobox references

Psilostachyins are group of chemical compounds isolated from Ambrosia psilostachya.
