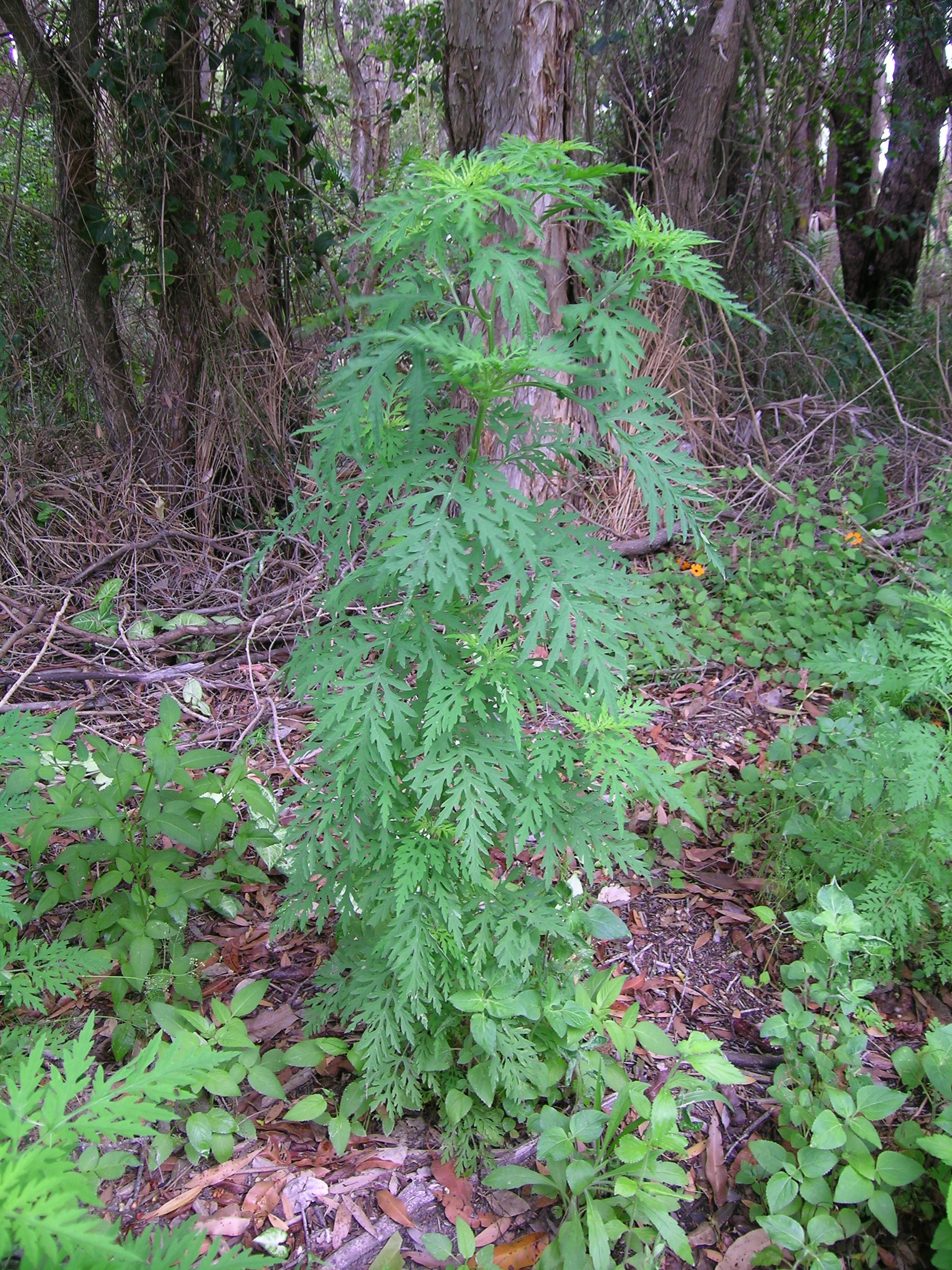

Conservation status
- Secure (NatureServe)

Scientific classification
- Kingdom: Plantae
- Clade: Tracheophytes
- Clade: Angiosperms
- Clade: Eudicots
- Clade: Asterids
- Order: Asterales
- Family: Asteraceae
- Tribe: Heliantheae
- Genus: Ambrosia
- Species: A. artemisiifolia

Binomial name
- Ambrosia artemisiifolia L.

Synonyms
- Ambrosia artemisiaefolia L.; Ambrosia chilensis Hook. & Arn.; Ambrosia elata Salisb.; Ambrosia elatior L.; Ambrosia glandulosa Scheele; Ambrosia monophylla (Walter) Rydb.; Ambrosia paniculata Michx.; Ambrosia peruviana Cabrera 1941 not Willd. 1805 nor DC. 1836; Iva monophylla Walter

= Ambrosia artemisiifolia =

Species of flowering plant in the daisy family

Ambrosia artemisiifolia, with the common names common ragweed, annual ragweed, and low ragweed, is a species of the genus Ambrosia native to regions of the Americas.

== Taxonomy ==
The species name, artemisiifolia, is given because the leaves were thought to bear a resemblance to the leaves of Artemisia, the true wormwoods.

It has also been called the common names: American wormwood, bitterweed, blackweed, carrot weed, hay fever weed, Roman wormwood, short ragweed, stammerwort, stickweed, tassel weed.

== Distribution ==
The plant is native to: North America across Canada, the eastern and central United States, the Great Plains, and in Alaska; the Caribbean on Cuba, Hispaniola, and Jamaica; and South America in the southern bioregion (Argentina, Chile, Paraguay, Uruguay), the western bioregion (Bolivia, Peru), and Brazil. The distribution of common ragweed in Europe is expected to expand northwards in the future due to climate change.

It is the most widespread species of the genus in North America, to which most of the other species of Ambrosia are endemic. During the summer it causes allergic reaction in those who are susceptible.

== Description ==
Ambrosia artemisiifolia is an annual plant that emerges in late spring. It propagates by seed.

It is much-branched, and grows up to 70 centimetres (2.3 ft) in height. The pinnately divided soft and hairy leaves are 3–12 centimetres (1.2–4.7 in) long.

Its bloom period is July to October in North America. Its pollen is wind-dispersed, and can be a strong allergen to people with hay fever.

It produces 2–4 mm obconic green to brown fruit. It sets seed in later summer or autumn. Since the seeds persist into winter and are numerous and rich in oil, they are relished by songbirds and upland game birds.

=== Galls ===
This species is host to the following insect-induced galls:

- Aceria ambrosiae Wilson, 1959 midge that forms bud-galls
- Asphondylia ambrosiae Gagné, 1975
- Aulacidea ambrosiaecola Ragweed stem gall wasp (see image)
- Epiblema strenuana (Walker, 1863) stem borer moth
- Neolasioptera ambrosiae Felt, 1909 small stem midge.
- Procecidochares gibba (Loew, 1873) gall fly
- Rhopalomyia ambrosiae Gagné, 1975 bud gall midge

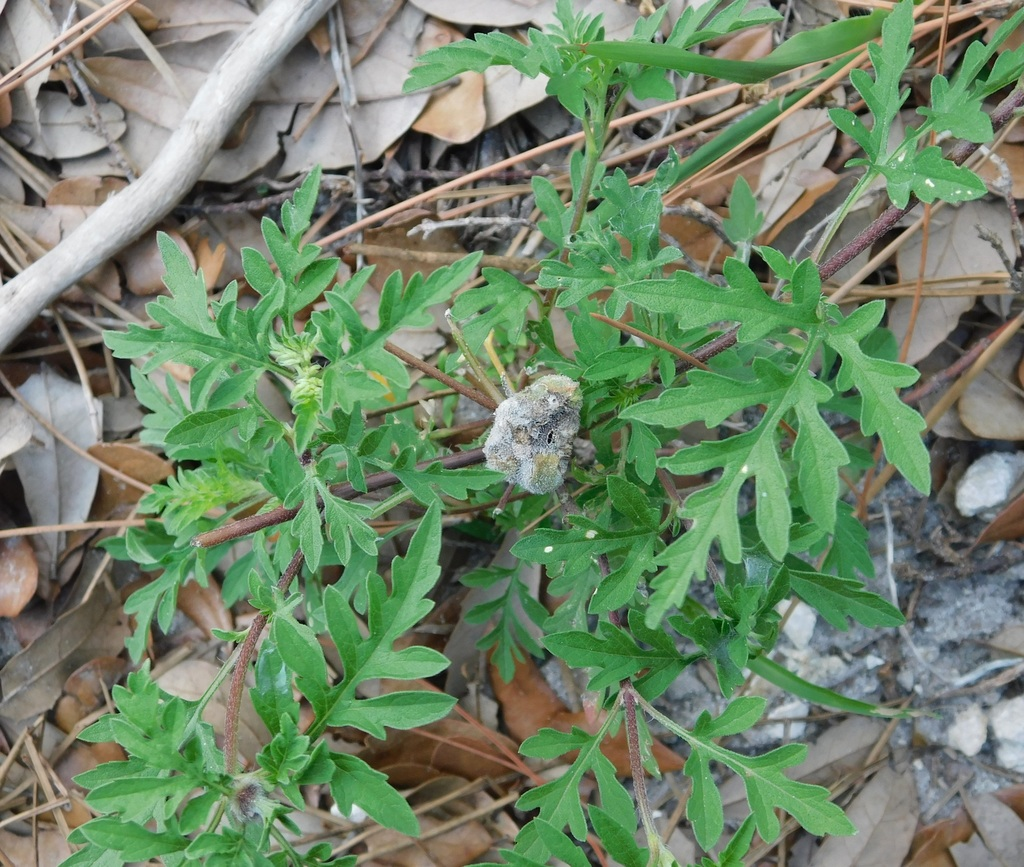
Asphondylia ambrosiae gall

external link to gallformers

=== Invasive species ===
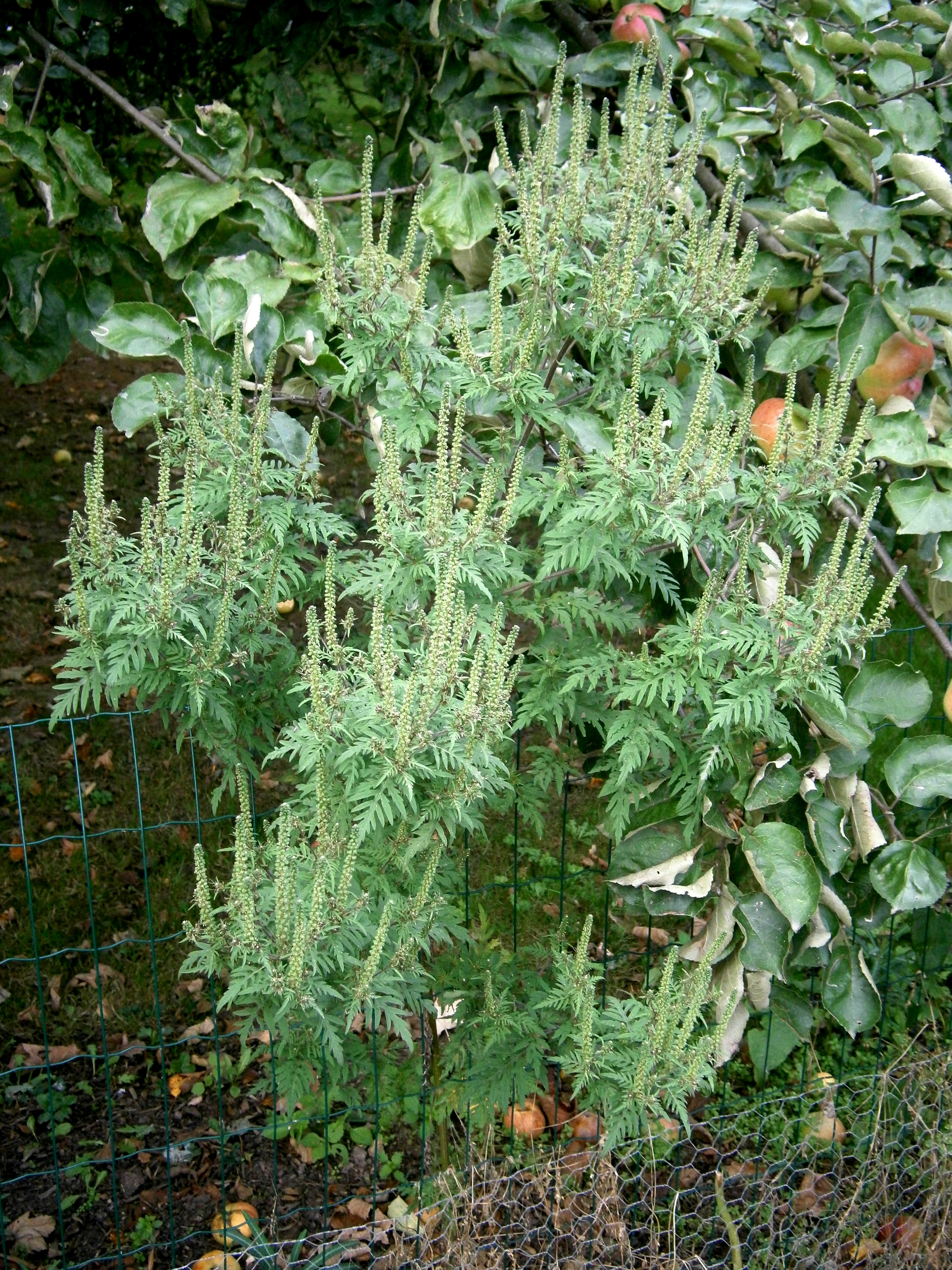
Ambrosia in chicken coop in Belgium

Common ragweed, Ambrosia artemisiifolia, is a widespread invasive species, and can become a noxious weed, that has naturalized in Europe; temperate Asia and the Indian subcontinent; temperate northern and southern Africa and Macaronesia; Oceania in Australia, New Zealand, and Hawaii; and Southwestern North America in California and the Southwestern United States. A scientific study investigated the genomic basis of invasiveness in Ambrosia artemisiifolia, introduced to Europe in the late 19th century, by resequencing 655 ragweed genomes, including 308 herbarium specimens collected up to 190 years ago. In invasive European populations, the study found selection signatures in defense genes and lower prevalence of disease-inducing plant pathogens. Together with temporal changes in population structure associated with introgression from closely related Ambrosia species, escape from specific microbial enemies likely favored the remarkable success of common ragweed as an invasive species.

Common ragweed is a very competitive weed and can produce yield losses in soybeans as high as 30 percent. Control with night tillage reduces emergence by around 45 percent. Small grains in rotation will also suppress common ragweed if they are overseeded with clover. Otherwise, the ragweed will grow and mature and produce seeds in the small grain stubble.

Its wind-blown pollen is highly allergenic.

==== Ragweed control ====
As of 2005 several herbicides were effective against common ragweed, although resistant populations were known to exist. In 2007 several Ambrosia artemisiifolia populations were glyphosate resistant, exclusively in the USA.

As of 2014 the ragweed leaf beetle, Ophraella communa, has been found south of the Alps in southern Switzerland and northern Italy. Many of the attacked plants were completely defoliated. Calligrapha suturalis was introduced to Russia, and then China, for ragweed control, with very positive initial results.

SMARTER is a European interdisciplinary network of experts involved in the control of ragweed, health care professionals, aerobiologists, ecologists, economists, and atmospheric and agricultural modellers.

== Chemical composition, and uses ==
=== Sesquiterpene lactones and molluscicide ===
Three sesquiterpene lactones isolated from the aerial parts of Ambrosia artemisiifolia were identified as psilostachyin A, psilostachyin B and psilostachyin C. All of them have some molluscicidal activity against the small tropical freshwater snail Oncomelania hupensis.

=== Medicinal ===
Ambrosia artemisiifolia has been a traditional medicinal plant for Native American tribes, including the Cherokee, Lakota, Iroquois, Dakota, and Delaware.

Historically, A. artemisiifolia was used by the Otoe Native American tribe in the Missouri River region as a remedy for nausea. It was used on the surface of the abdomen, where the patient was scarified and then dressed with the bruised leaves. It was also used by the Houma tribe in Louisiana for menstruation pain by making a tea out of the boiled roots.

=== Phytoremediation ===
Ambrosia artemisiifolia is used in phytoremediation projects remediating soil pollution, for removing heavy metals such as lead from contaminated soil.

== Gallery ==
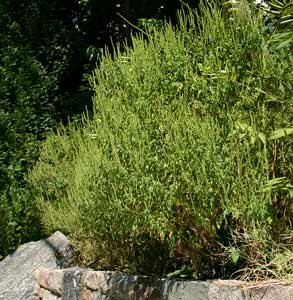
Plant from distance

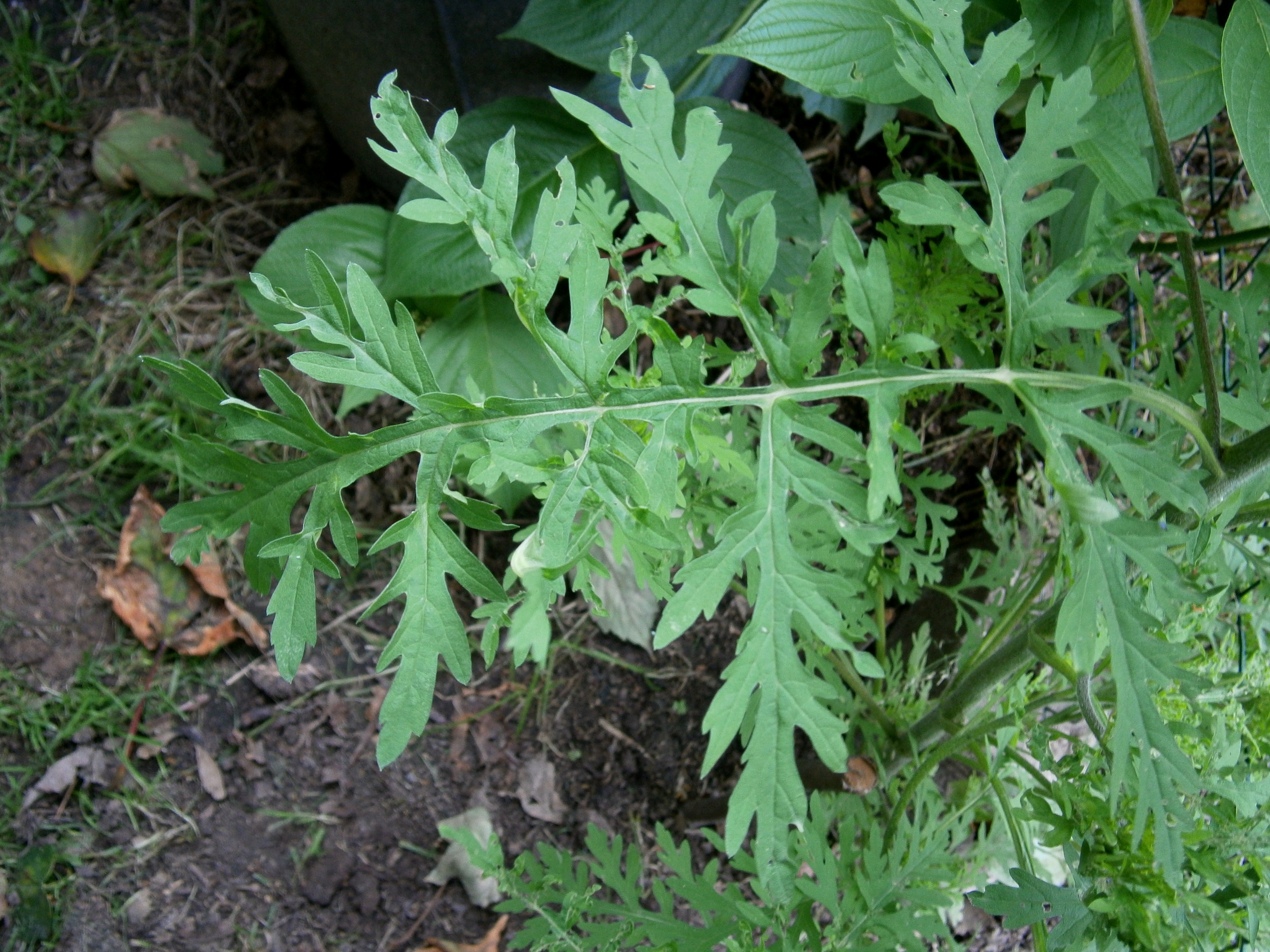
Close-up of leaf

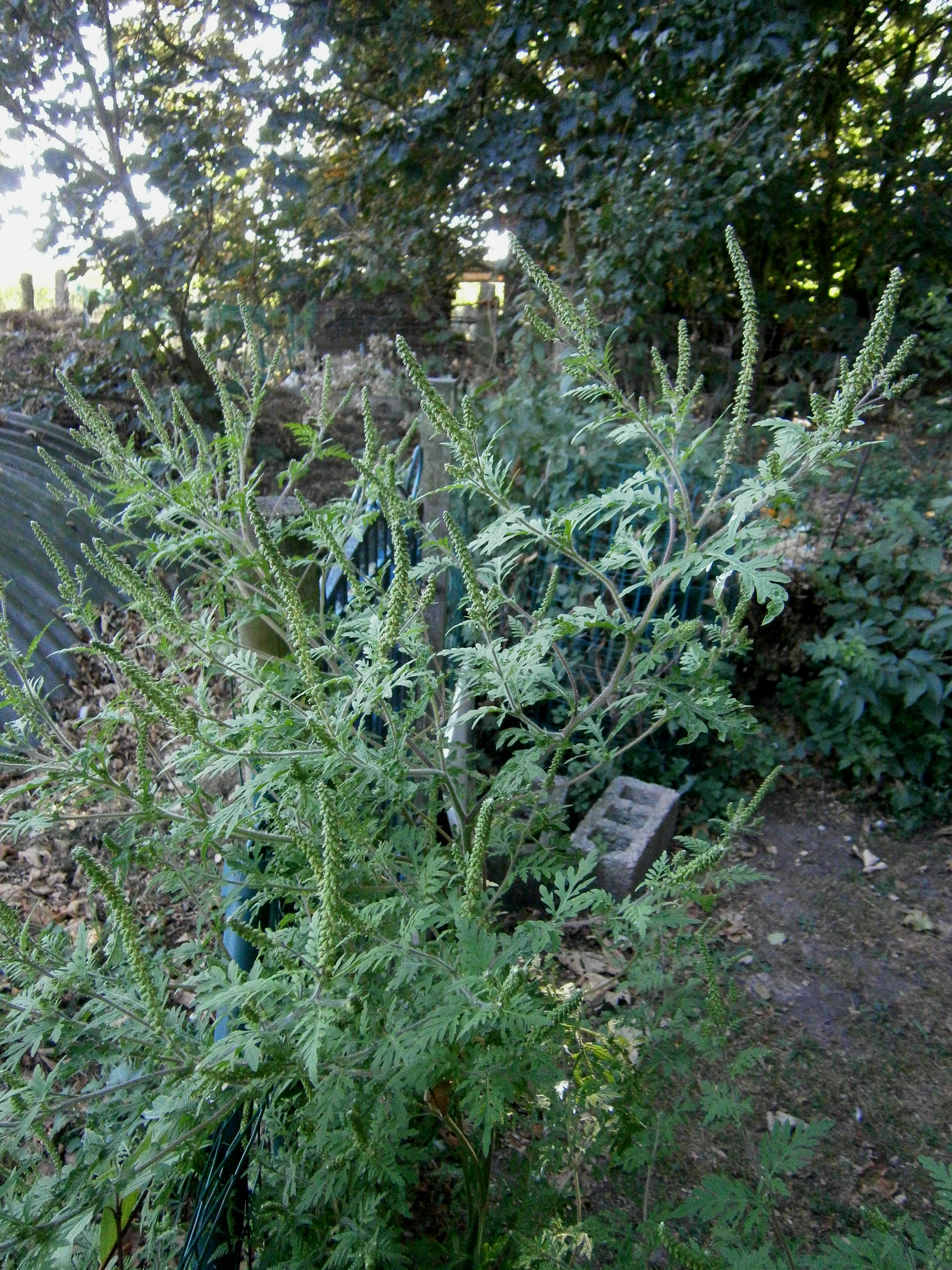
Inflorescence (male capitula)

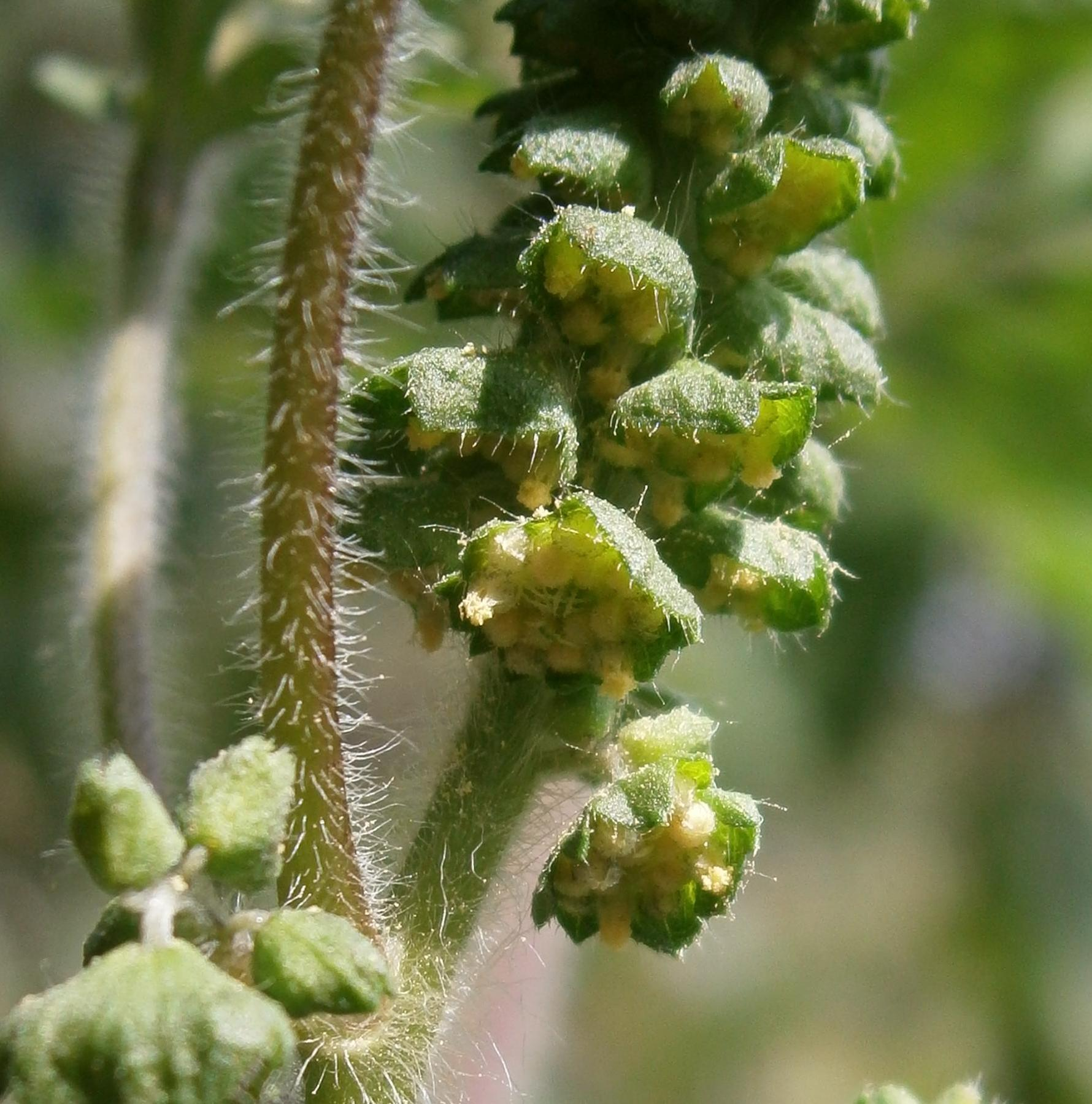
Close-up of male capitula

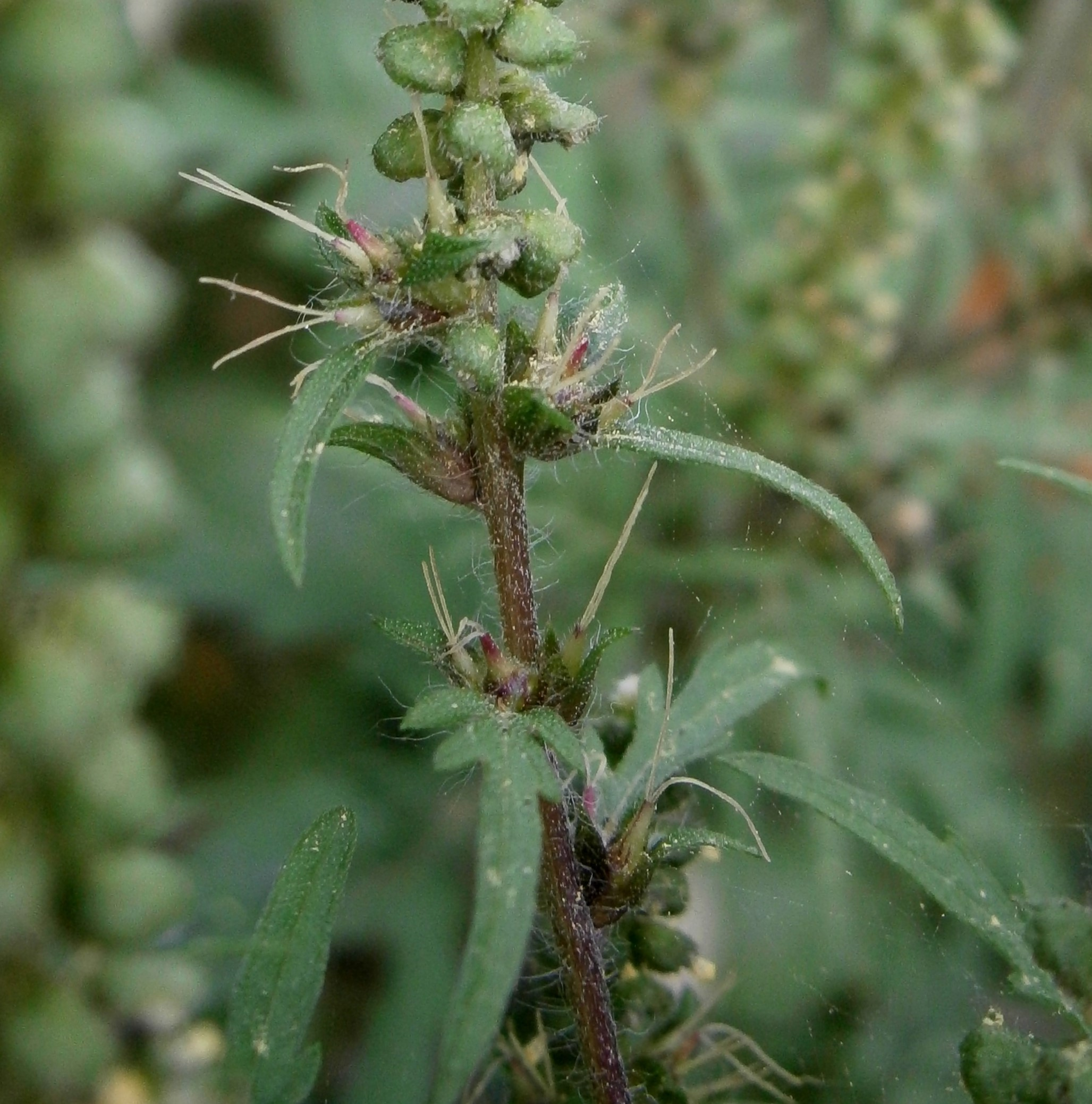
Female flowers in leaf axil

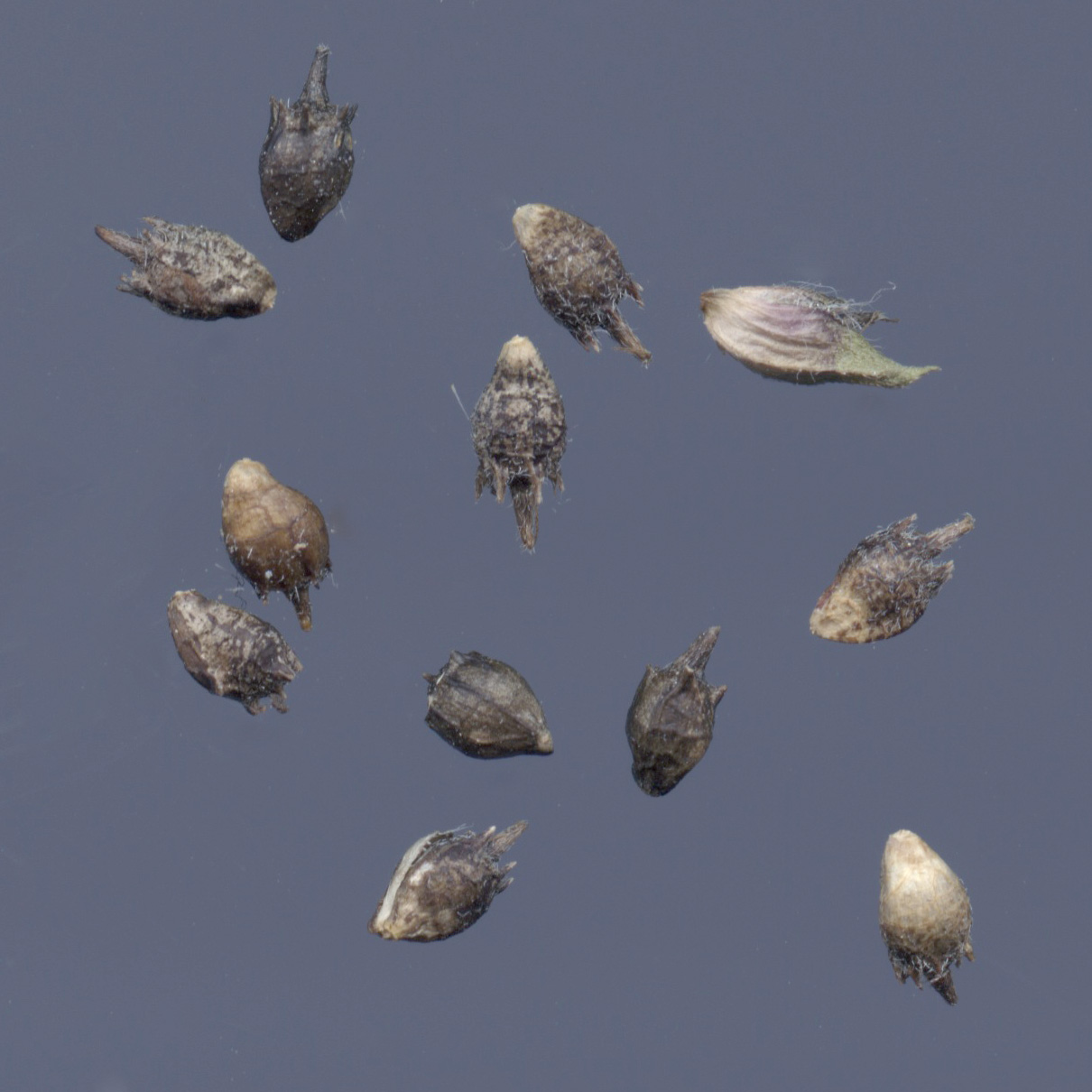
Achenes

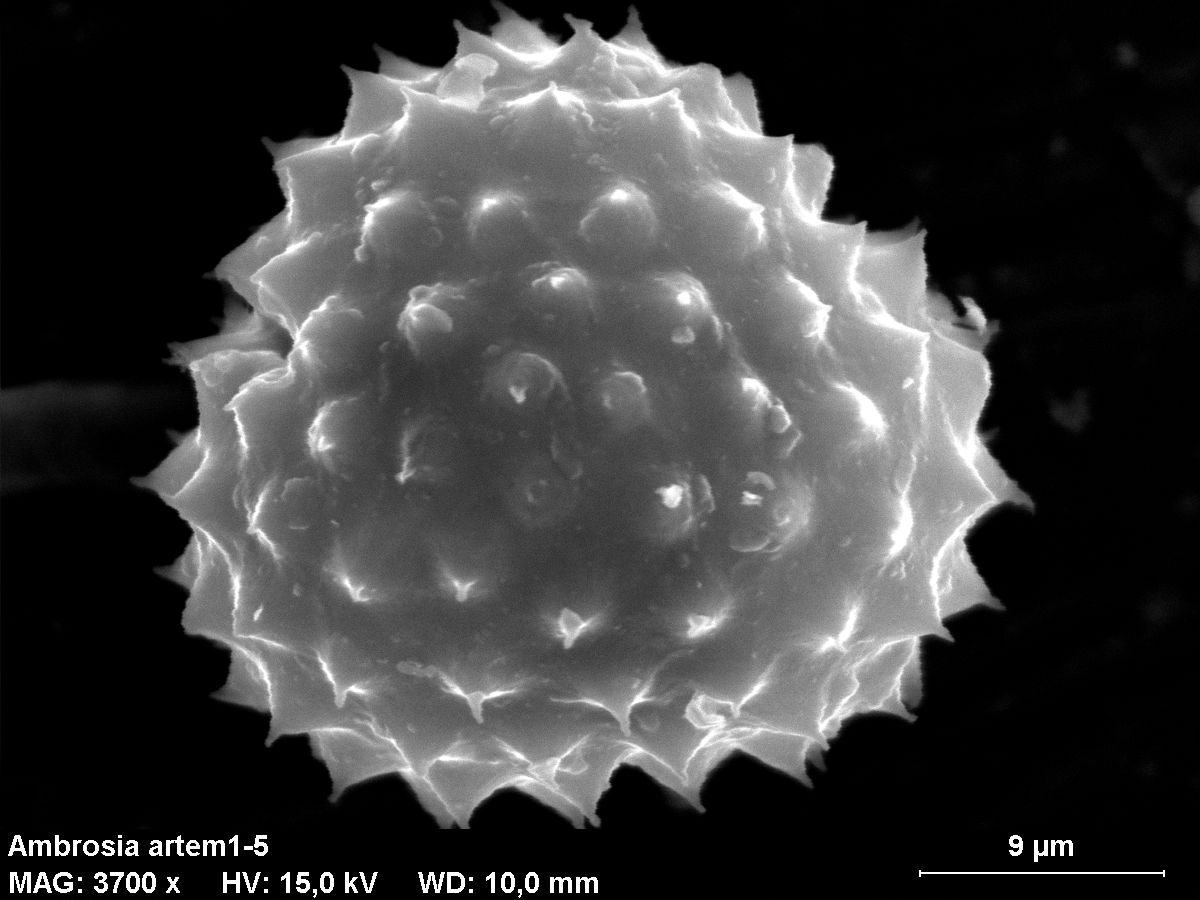
Pollen grain (scanning electron microscope)
